= Geneviève Fioraso =

French politician

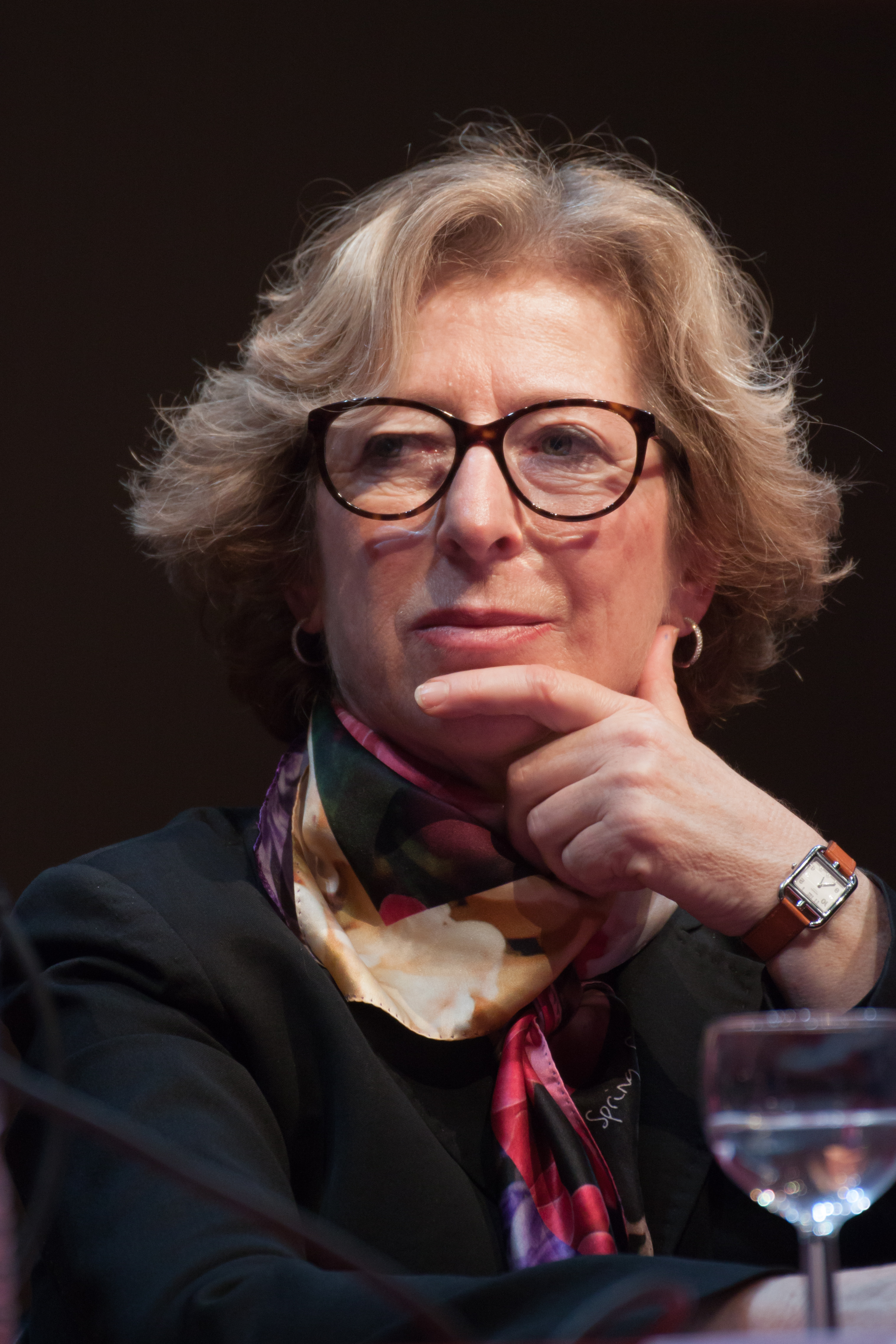

Member of the National Assembly for Isère's 1st constituency
- In office 17 June 2012 – 21 June 2017
- Preceded by: Richard Cazenave
- Succeeded by: Olivier Véran

Minister of Higher Education
- In office 2012–2015
- President: François Hollande
- Prime Minister: Jean-Marc Ayrault; Manuel Valls
- Preceded by: Laurent Wauquiez
- Succeeded by: Najat Vallaud-Belkacem

Personal details
- Born: Geneviève Lefèvre; 10 October 1954 (age 71) Amiens, France
- Party: Socialist Party
- Education: University of Amiens (master's degree in English)
- Profession: Teacher
- Website: Official page on the site of the National Assembly

Geneviève Fioraso (born 10 October 1954) is a French politician who served as a member of the National Assembly from 2007 to 2017, representing the first district of Isère. On 16 May 2012 she was appointed Minister for Higher Education and Research in the French government of Jean-Marc Ayrault.

== Early life and education ==
Born in Amiens in 1954, the youngest of six children, Fioraso obtained her high-school diploma Baccalauréat at the age of 16 years and married at 18. A student of Hypo-Khâgne, she continued her studies and obtained a master's degree in English, then worked as an English teacher in Amiens.

== Early career ==
In 1978 Fioraso left teaching and moved to Grenoble, where she served first as Information Officer, then managing Documentation and Press for the City of Grenoble, where she began collaborating with Hubert Dubedout, city's mayor and MP, and became his parliamentary attaché in 1983.

In 1985 Fioraso participated in the cantonal electoral campaign, alongside Michel Destot. From 1989 to 1995, she was part of the management team of Corys, a startups of the CEA. Once he was elected mayor of Grenoble in 1995, Michel Destot requested that she serve as his Chief of Staff, for which she followed the economy and innovation affairs in particular.

From 1999 to 2001, Fioraso was director of the Agence Régionale du Numérique, a regional agency set up by the digital network of cities of the Rhône-Alpes region.

From 2001 to 2004, Fioraso was a senior marketing manager at France Telecom, in charge of emerging markets in the social-health sector.

From 2008 Fioraso was deputy for the Economy, Universities and Research for the City Council of Grenoble. During her previous term she was Deputy assistant for the Economy, Innovation, Trade and Craft, and First Vice-President of Metro -Agglomeration community of the Grenoble Alpes Métropole-, in charge of economic development. From 2003, she was the CEO of the S.E.M. Minatec Entreprises (public-private venture, entrusted with the marketing of high-tech building of Minatec). She also serves as Chair of the Institut d'Administration des Entreprises Grenoble, Business Administration Institute of Grenoble.

== Political career ==
=== Member of the National Assembly, 2007–2017 ===
In 2007, Fioraso won 63.03% of the vote and defeated Alain Carignon to be elected députée -member of the French Parliament- in Isère's 1st constituency. In parliament, she was a board member of the Socialist, Radical, Citizen and various left group; member of the Committee on Economic Affairs, the Environment and Territory; and member of the Parliamentary Office for the Evaluation of Scientific and Technological Choices (OPECST, Office parlementaire d'évaluation des choix scientifiques et technologiques).

=== Minister of Higher Education, 2012–2015 ===
On 11 February 2014, Fioraso was among the guests invited to the state dinner hosted by U.S. President Barack Obama in honor of President François Hollande at the White House.

In December 2014, Fioraso managed to resolve a two-year strategy dispute between France and Germany on the European Space Agency and paved the way to an agreement of 20 governments on funding for Ariane 6 space rocket.

Fioraso did not contest the 2017 French legislative election.

Political offices
Preceded by Laurent Wauquiez	Minister of Higher Education and Research; 2012–2015	Succeeded by Najat Vallaud-Belkacem
