= Minister of Higher Education, Research and Innovation (France) =

Government ministry of France

Minister of Higher Education, Research and Space of the French Republic
- Ministre de l'Enseignement supérieur et de la Recherche
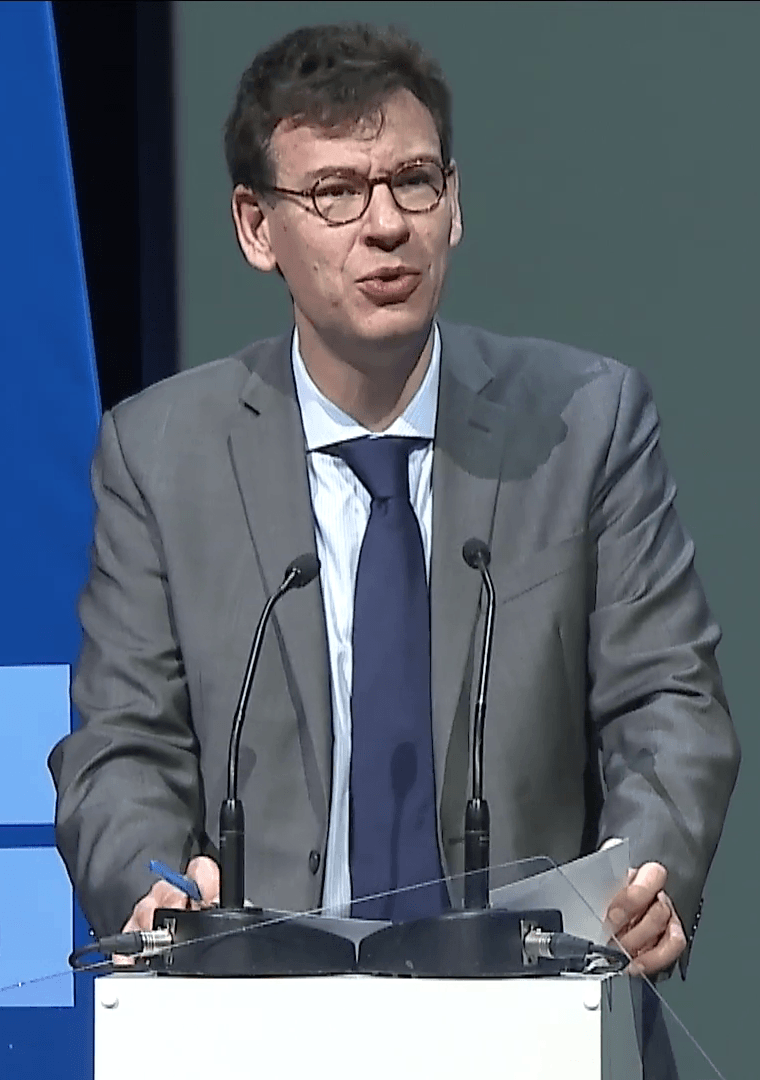
- Incumbent; Philippe Baptiste since 23 December 2024
- Ministry of Higher Education, Research and Space
- Member of: Cabinet
- Reports to: President of the Republic; Prime Minister
- Seat: Collège de Boncourt Paris 5^{e}, France
- Nominator: Prime Minister
- Appointer: President of the Republic
- Term length: No fixed term
- Constituting instrument: Decree of 12 October 2025 concerning the composition of the Government
- Formation: 8 June 1974
- First holder: Irène Joliot-Curie as Under-Secretary for Science and Research
- Salary: €10,700 per month
- Website: www.enseignementsup-recherche.gouv.fr

The Minister of Higher Education, Research and Space (French: Ministre de l'Enseignement supérieur, de la Recherche et de l'Espace; formerly Minister of Higher Education, Research and Innovation or Ministre de l'Enseignement supérieur, de la Recherche et de l'Innovation) is a cabinet position in the French Government overseeing university-level education and research. The ministry is headquartered in the 5th arrondissement of Paris. The current minister was appointed on 23 December 2024 and is Philippe Baptiste serving in the Bayrou government, first Lecornu government and the current second Lecornu government — he is an engineer, holder of a doctorate from the University of Technology of Compiègne and a graduate engineer of Mines Nancy; a researcher with the CNRS; a professor at École Polytechnique; and former President of the National Centre for Space Studies (CNES). The minister has either headed a ministry in its own right — as between 1959 and 1974 (as Minister for Scientific Research) and from 1992 to 1993 (as Minister for Research and Space); been attached to the Prime Minister’s Office, as between 1974 and 1981; or served as a delegated minister, as has been the case since 1993, under the supervision of another ministry. Between 1993 and 2025, the delegated minister has been under the authority of the Minister of National Education.

The Ministry is one of the sponsors of the Irène Joliot-Curie Prize, which is awarded to women scientists who have distinguished themselves by the quality of their research.

In October 2021, the ministry released an official translation of its second plan for open science.

== Function ==
The minister exercises her responsibilities for higher education and research. He draws up and implements the Government’s policy on higher education and student life. He proposes — and, in coordination with the other relevant ministers, delivers — the Government’s policy on research and technology.

Together with the Minister of Economics, Finance and Industrial and Digital Sovereignty, he formulates and executes space policy, excluding military matters, which fall exclusively within the remit of the Minister for the Armed Forces. He shares responsibility with the Minister of Economics for the development of artificial intelligence. He is also responsible, jointly with that ministry and in liaison with other interested ministers, for defining and overseeing innovation policy. The decree appointing Philippe Baptiste further specifies that the minister is tasked with “contributing to ecological and energy transition policy” (Decree No. 2025-12 of 8 January 2025).

== Ministers ==
With the victory of the Popular Front in the spring of 1936, the left-wing coalition bringing together the Communists and the Socialists formed a government and Léon Blum became President of the Council of Ministers. He created the post of Under-Secretary of State for Scientific Research and entrusted it to a woman, Irène Joliot-Curie, a researcher at the Institut du Radium and the 1935 Nobel laureate in Chemistry. She was the first woman to be appointed to government despite the fact that French women still did not have the right to vote at the time. A few months later, in November 1936, she resigned to resume her scientific research. In a letter to Léon Blum, she specified that this departure should not be interpreted as disagreement with the government’s actions, for which she retained her full sympathy.

The under-secretariat was then entrusted to the chemist Jean Perrin, Nobel Prize winner in Chemistry (1926). Perrin created the Central Service for Scientific Research to recruit researchers and technicians, endowed with a substantial budget enabling the funding of major projects. The under-secretariat was abolished in 1937 and re-established after the Second World War, in 1954, in the socialist government of Pierre Mendès France. Holders of the post were often researchers or university professors themselves, such as the mineralogist Henri Longchambon (1954–1956) and the geographer Alice Saunier-Seïté.

From 1962, the office of Minister for Scientific Research also encompassed industrial policy. De Gaulle appointed Gaston Palewski, a career diplomat and promoter of the second atomic plan, which organised collaboration between industry and research and established the Kourou space base in French Guiana. Between 1962 and 1969, the minister’s title covered not only scientific research but also atomic and space affairs. From 1 March to 14 June 1974, responsibility for research was transferred to the Minister for Industry, then to a Secretary of State under the Prime Minister’s authority from 1974 to 1981.

Under President François Mitterrand, the portfolio broadened to include education and was first entrusted to Jean-Pierre Chevènement, former president of the Centre d’études, de recherches et d’éducation socialiste (CERES), who — close to a Marxist outlook — advocated state monopoly capitalism and stressed the importance of education and public research. A full ministry until 1986, it then came under the authority of the Minister of National Education and subsequently the Minister for Industry, Posts and Telecommunications between 1993 and 1997. From 2002, the minister’s title included New Technologies. It returned to full ministerial status between 2007 and 2014, forming the Ministry of Higher Education and Research during Nicolas Sarkozy’s presidency.

In that capacity, Minister Valérie Pécresse introduced the Law on the Liberties and Responsibilities of Universities, which increased universities’ budgetary and administrative autonomy. The “Pécresse law”, which sparked strikes and demonstrations between 2007 and 2009, was criticised for instituting periodic individual evaluation of teaching staff, allowing universities to manage their entire budgets — including the share for salaries — thus liberalising higher education and reducing the powers of student councils.

Once again a full ministry between 2017 and 2022, under Emmanuel Macron’s first term, the portfolio was entrusted to Frédérique Vidal, a specialist in molecular genetics and former professor at the University of Nice–Sophia Antipolis, tasked with reforming access to the first cycle of higher education through the “Students’ Plan”. The stated aim was to reform access to university, in principle hitherto guaranteed by obtaining the baccalauréat. However, the introduction of a new pre-registration platform for first-year higher education, Parcoursup, was viewed as a “tool of social sorting”, and the reform — accused of reinforcing inequalities of access to university without creating more places — prompted strikes in 2018. According to a report by the French Senate on funding, more than two billion euros were lacking to finance the Students’ Plan over 2018–2022. On 8 July 2020, the Economic and Social Council, tasked with delivering an expert opinion on the reform project, judged that the financial programming ‘is not commensurate with the considerable challenges our country must face’. According to the Council’s rapporteur responsible for assessing the reform’s merits, Sylviane Lejeune, ‘We had already identified a loss of ground and warned of the need to invest massively in research. Yet what is proposed is far from sufficient; it is not serious.’ The Council recommended that the government invest €6 billion by 2022, whereas the reform provided for only €400 million of investment in 2021. The ministry did not follow the Council’s unfavourable recommendation.

The minister was later accused of exerting pressure on universities: on 16 February 2021, Frédérique Vidal announced her intention to ask the CNRS to conduct a “scientific inquiry” into universities to establish an “overview of all research” that would distinguish “what falls within academic research and what falls within activism and opinion”, alleging that French universities were not “impervious” to “Islamo-leftism”, which “is eating away at society as a whole”. Her remarks were subsequently condemned across academia, notably by a petition signed by 14,000 higher-education and research staff calling for her resignation. The government spokesperson, Gabriel Attal, was obliged to distance himself from the minister, declaring that “the President of the Republic is deeply attached to the independence of academic staff, which is one of the foundations of our Republic and which we must guarantee”. The CNRS eventually admonished the minister, reminding her that “Islamo-leftism” is not a scientific reality and that the study of decolonial and gender theories has its place within scientific research. In March 2023, the French daily Le Monde revealed that the minister had ultimately not commissioned any inquiry into “Islamo-leftism” while in office, contrary to what she had claimed.

During Emmanuel Macron’s second term, the minister Sylvie Retailleau, a former physicist and president of Paris-Saclay University, was instructed by the President to carry out “Act II of university autonomy”, denounced by the Communist Party as a step towards the privatisation of public higher education in France. “Act II of autonomy” aimed to render universities fully autonomous by allowing them to manage their own recruitment and funding and by limiting ministerial intervention in scientific research programmes and universities’ institutional decisions. The reform ultimately did not come to fruition owing to the dissolution of the National Assembly decided by the President of the Republic on 9 June 2024. The Alsatian MP Patrick Hetzel briefly served as minister between September and December 2024 before being succeeded by the former director of the Centre for Space Studies, Philippe Baptiste, in the Bayrou government—not as a full minister but as a minister delegate to the Minister of National Education, Élisabeth Borne.

The current minister, Philippe Baptiste, was appointed on 23 December 2024 in the Bayrou government. He was retained in office in the short-lived first Lecornu government and has continued in post in the second Lecornu government since 12 October 2025.

== See also ==
- Ministry of National Education for all levels of public education, including universities
- Ministry of Higher Education, Research and Space
- Higher education in France
- Universities in France
