= Hugo Prevost =

French politician

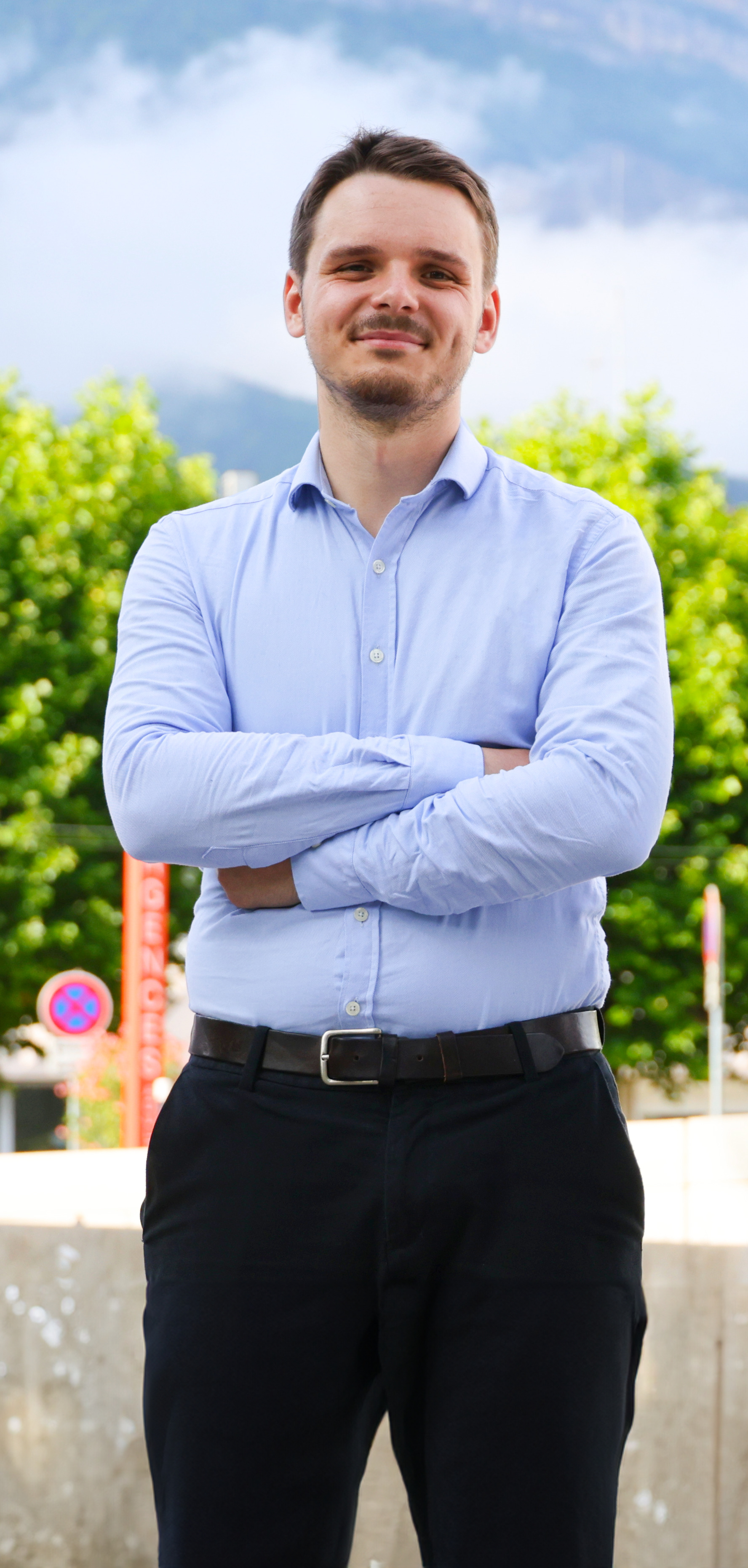
- Prevost in 2024.

Member of the French National Assembly for Isère's 1st constituency
- In office 18 July 2024 – 15 October 2024
- Preceded by: Olivier Véran
- Succeeded by: Camille Galliard-Minier

Personal details
- Born: 9 September 1999 (age 26) Grenoble, Isère (France)
- Political party: La France Insoumise

Hugo Prevost (born 9 September 1999 in Grenoble) is a French politician of the La France Insoumise. He was elected member of the National Assembly for Isère's 1st constituency in 2024. He resigned on October 9, 2024 following accusations of sexist and sexual violence.

== Biography ==
Hugo Prevost spent his childhood in his hometown of Grenoble. He is the son of a construction executive and a CNRS engineer. He has Spanish roots and claims the legacy of a left-wing heritage passed down from his Spanish Republican ancestors who fled the regime of Francisco Franco.

== Student union and activist involvement ==
Hugo Prevost became politically active at the age of 16, opposing the “labour law” within the Union nationale lycéenne (UNL) in Grenoble, a left-wing high school student union, where he campaigned for five years. He later took part in movements against Parcoursup and the privatisation of higher education.

In 2018, he was elected to the Grenoble CROUS as a representative of the Union nationale des étudiants de France (UNEF).

In 2020, he volunteered with the collective Génération Précarité, an association that organised free distributions of food and hygiene products.

In 2021, while serving on the national executive board of L’Alternative, he was elected to the CNESER (National Council for Higher Education and Research) for the student organisation.

In 2022, Hugo Prevost began a master’s degree in Economics — Analysis and Economic Policy (APE) — at Sorbonne Paris Nord University. As spokesperson for the student union Union étudiante since April 2023, he has taken part in negotiations with Higher Education Minister Sylvie Retailleau.

== Accusations of gender-based and sexual violence ==
On October 8, 2024, he was expelled from the parliamentary group of La France Insoumise (LFI) for “serious sexual misconduct that could constitute criminal offenses, prior to his election,” covering the period from 2020 to 2024. The LFI–NFP parliamentary group stated that it had been alerted on September 23 by its Committee for Vigilance Against Sexist and Sexual Violence (CVSS), before hearing from the deputy representing Isère’s 1st constituency. Meanwhile, L’Union étudiante, a student union in which he had served on the national executive team, issued a statement calling for his immediate resignation after submitting a 17-page report to LFI.

According to Mediapart, which reviewed the union’s report, Hugo Prevost fostered a macho culture within the organization, using sexism as part of a broader pattern of political control that included moral harassment, and allegedly protected other men accused of sexist and sexual violence within the union. Testimonies gathered by Le Dauphiné libéré from student activists echoed these claims, emphasizing moral harassment in particular. Mediapart also reported that Paul Vannier, MP for Val-d’Oise and head of elections for LFI, failed to act on a warning made in mid-June during negotiations for the Nouveau Front populaire’s candidate selections.

On October 9, 2024, Hugo Prevost announced his resignation from Parliament. His deputy, Salomé Robin, had resigned shortly beforehand and publicly called for his departure, leaving the seat vacant. A by-election was subsequently held in Isère’s 1st constituency, where LFI fielded Lyes Louffok as its candidate. He was defeated on January 19, 2025, by Renaissance candidate Camille Galliard-Minier, who had previously served as MP for the constituency from 2020 to 2022.
