= Vedano =

Vedano may refer to the following places in Italy:

- Vedano al Lambro, comune in the Province of Monza and Brianza
- Vedano Olona, comune in the Province of Varese
