= Retailleau =

Retailleau is a French surname. Notable people with the surname include:

- Bruno Retailleau (born 1960), French politician
- Sylvie Retailleau (born 1965), French politician
- Valentin Retailleau (born 2000), French cyclist
