= Olivier Véran =

French politician (born 1980)

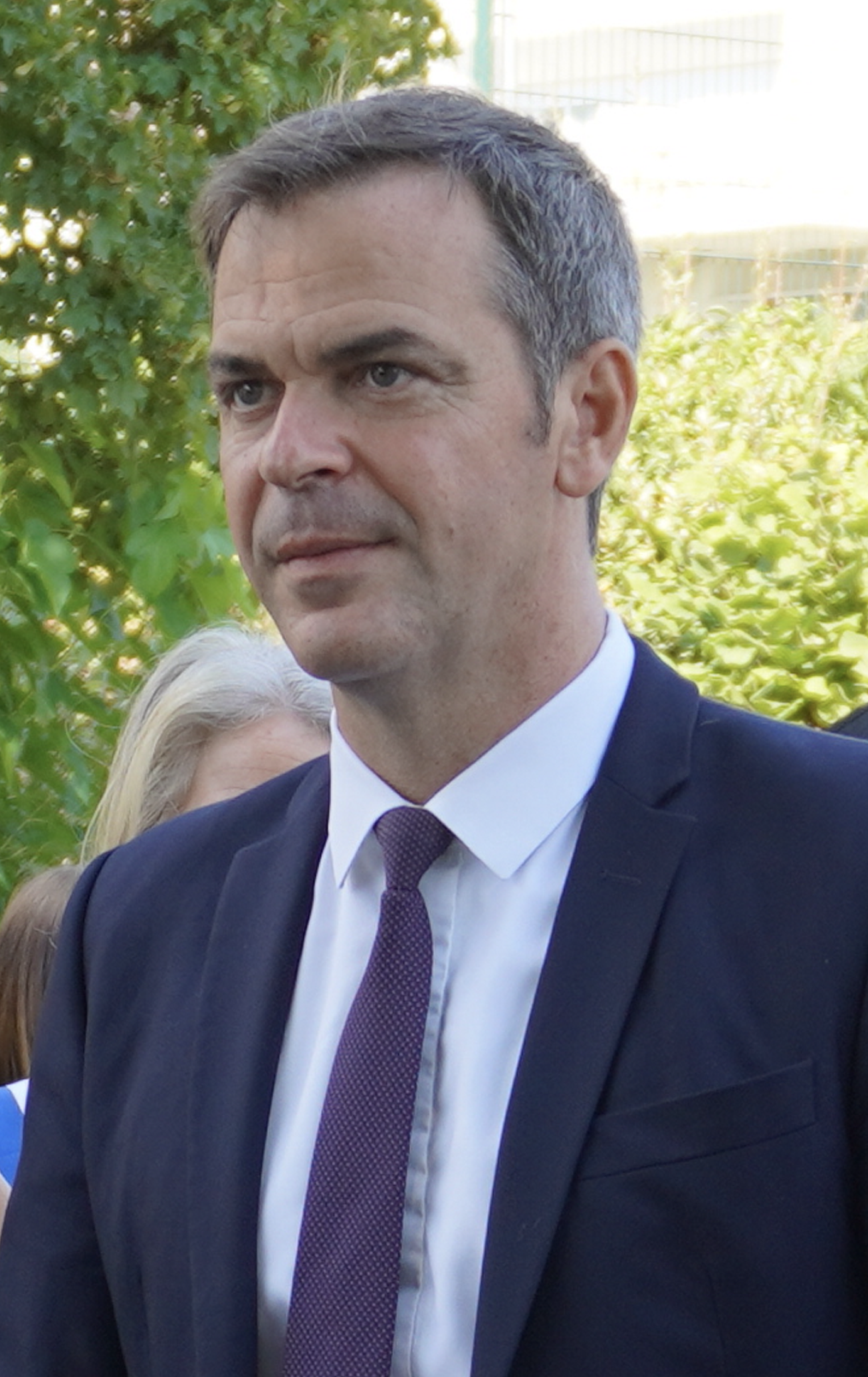
- Véran in 2022

Minister Delegate for Democratic Renewal Spokesperson of the Government
- In office 4 July 2022 – 11 January 2024
- Prime Minister: Élisabeth Borne
- Preceded by: Olivia Grégoire (Spokesperson of the Government); Himself (Democratic Life)
- Succeeded by: Prisca Thévenot

Minister Delegate for Relations with Parliament and Democratic Life
- In office 20 May 2022 – 4 July 2022
- Prime Minister: Élisabeth Borne
- Preceded by: Marc Fesneau
- Succeeded by: Franck Riester

Minister of Solidarity and Health
- In office 16 February 2020 – 20 May 2022
- Prime Minister: Édouard Philippe; Jean Castex
- Preceded by: Agnès Buzyn
- Succeeded by: Brigitte Bourguignon (Health) Damien Abad (Solidarity)

Member of the National Assembly for Isère's 1st constituency
- In office 10 February 2024 – 9 June 2024
- Preceded by: Servane Hugues
- Succeeded by: Hugo Prevost
- In office 22 June 2022 – 22 July 2022
- Preceded by: Camille Galliard-Minier
- Succeeded by: Servane Hugues
- In office 21 June 2017 – 17 March 2020
- Preceded by: Geneviève Fioraso
- Succeeded by: Camille Galliard-Minier
- In office 22 July 2012 – 5 April 2015
- Preceded by: Geneviève Fioraso
- Succeeded by: Geneviève Fioraso

Member of the Regional Council of Auvergne-Rhône-Alpes for Isère
- In office 4 January 2016 – 2 July 2021
- President: Laurent Wauquiez

Personal details
- Born: 22 April 1980 (age 46) Saint-Martin-d'Hères, France
- Party: Renaissance (2017–present)
- Other political affiliations: Socialist Party (until 2017)
- Spouse: Camille Lesne (m. 2008; div. 2018)
- Domestic partner: Coralie Dubost (2018–2021)
- Children: 2
- Education: University of Grenoble; Sciences Po
- Profession: Neurologist

Olivier Véran (French: [ɔlivje veʁɑ̃]; born 22 April 1980) is a French neurologist and politician. He served as Minister of Solidarity and Health from 2020 to 2022 under Prime Ministers Édouard Philippe and Jean Castex, becoming a key figure during the COVID-19 pandemic in France. Subsequently, he held the positions of Minister Delegate for Relations with Parliament and Democratic Life (May–July 2022) and Minister Delegate for Democratic Renewal and Spokesperson of the Government (2022–2024) in the government of Prime Minister Élisabeth Borne.

A member of Renaissance (RE) since 2017 and previously of the Socialist Party (PS), Véran has represented Isère's 1st constituency in the National Assembly across multiple terms (2012–2015, 2017–2020, and briefly in 2022 and 2024). In the 2024 snap legislative election, he lost his seat in the National Assembly.

== Professional career ==
Véran worked as a neurologist at the Grenoble Alpes University Hospital. He has served as president of the Association of Hospital Assistants in Grenoble, spokesperson for the National Intersyncal of Hospital Interns, and advisor to the Departmental Order of Physicians of Isère.

== Political career ==
=== Early career ===
Véran was first elected to the National Assembly for Isère as Geneviève Fioraso's substitute in the 2012 legislative election, as a member of the Socialist Party. During his time as a deputy, he was mandated by Prime Minister Jean-Marc Ayrault with a government inquiry into the regulatory framework for blood products.

Véran unsuccessfully competed in the 2015 departmental election in the canton of Meylan for a seat in the Departmental Council of Isère. Shortly thereafter, Véran left the National Assembly, as Fioraso returned from service in government. In the 2015 regional election later that year, he was elected to the Regional Council of Auvergne-Rhône-Alpes. In 2016, Minister of Health Marisol Touraine appointed him to steer a committee in charge of drafting reform proposals for France's hospital financing.

Ahead of the 2017 presidential election, Véran endorsed Emmanuel Macron and joined En Marche! (later La République En Marche!). He was reelected to the National Assembly on 18 June 2017. In Parliament, he served as a member of the Committee on Social Affairs, where he was the rapporteur on social security and the government's pension reform plans.

=== Minister of Health, 2020–2022 ===
Véran first became Minister for Solidarity and Health in the government of Prime Minister Édouard Philippe from 16 February 2020. In October 2020, he was one of several current and former government officials whose home was searched by French authorities following complaints about the government's handling of the COVID-19 pandemic in France.

During his time in office, Véran implemented the government's decision to make access to birth control free for women aged up to 25 years old from 2022 onwards.

=== Legislative elections of 2024 ===
In the 2024 French legislative election, he arrived second at the issue of the first round, leading to a "triangular" second round. On 1 July 2024, he had not yet indicated whether he would quit the race before the second round, as requested by Emmanuel Macron.

== Personal life ==
Véran was in a relationship from 2018 until 2021 with fellow politician Coralie Dubost, who sat in the National Assembly from 2017 to 2022.
