= Elections in Alsace =

This page gathers the results of elections in Alsace.

== Regional elections ==
=== 2004 regional election ===
In the 2004 regional election, which took place on March 21 and March 28, 2004, Adrien Zeller (UMP) was re-elected President, defeating Jacques Bigot (PS).

| Candidate | Party | Votes (Round One) | % (Round One) | Votes (Round Two) | % (Round Two) |
|---|---|---|---|---|---|
| Adrien Zeller (incumbent) | UMP | 225,193 | 34.06% | 299,353 | 43.56% |
| Jacques Bigot | PS-Verts | 133,038 | 20.12% | 236,709 | 34.44% |
| Patrick Binder | FN | 122,860 | 18.58% | 151,187 | 22.00% |
| Robert Spieler | Alsace d'abord | 62,253 | 9.42% | - | - |
| Antoine Waechter | MEI | 48.949 | 7.40% | - | - |
| Alfred Wahl | PCF-PRG-MRC | 24,692 | 3.73% | - | - |
| Patrick Merck | Divers | 23,540 | 3.56% | - | - |
| Françoise Ruch | LCR/LO | 20,004 | 3.03% | - | - |
| Pascale Grauss | Federalist Party | 578 | 0.09% | - | - |
| Total | | 661,107 | 100,00% | 687,249 | 100,00% |
