= Bas-Rhin's 7th constituency =

Constituency of the National Assembly of France

7th constituency of the Bas-Rhin
- inline Constituency of the National Assembly of France

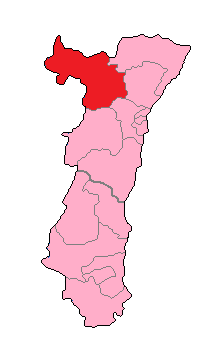
- Bas-Rhin's 7th Constituency shown within Alsace

- Bas-Rhin in France
- Deputy: Patrick Hetzel; LR
- Department: Bas-Rhin
- Cantons: Bouxwiller, Drulingen, Marmoutier, La Petite-Pierre, Sarre-Union, Saverne, Hochfelden
- Registered voters: 84,668

The 7th constituency of the Bas-Rhin is a French legislative constituency in the Bas-Rhin département.

== Description ==
Bas-Rhin's 7th Constituency covers the north western portion of Bas Rhin and includes all of the Arrondissement of Saverne as well as Hochfelden from the Arrondissement of Strasbourg-Campagne. It also includes the southern portion of the Northern Vosges Regional Natural Park.

Like much of Alsace the constituency has returned conservative members to the National Assembly throughout the Fifth Republic.

== Historic representation ==
Election	Member	Party
1958	Georges Kuntz	MRP
1962	Alfred Westphal	UNR
1967	Alfred Westphal	UDR
1968	Alfred Westphal	UDR
1973	Adrien Zeller	SE
1978	Adrien Zeller	SE
1981	Adrien Zeller	UDF
1986	Proportional representation – no election by constituency	
1988	Adrien Zeller	UDF
1993	Adrien Zeller	UDF
1997	Adrien Zeller	UDF
1998	Émile Blessig	UDF
2002	Émile Blessig	UDF
2007	Émile Blessig	UMP
2012	Patrick Hetzel	UMP
2017	Patrick Hetzel	LR
2022	Patrick Hetzel	LR

== Election results ==
=== 2024 ===
Legislative Election 2024: Bas-Rhin's 7th constituency
Party	Candidate	Votes	%	±%
LFI (NFP)	Serge Bloch	6,912	12.42	−021
LR	Patrick Hetzel	17,974	32.31	−2.70
LO	Jean Meyer	414	0.74	N/A
MoDem (Ensemble)	Eric Wolff	4,734	8.51	−5.05
RN	Denis Kieffer	23,071	41.47	+20.16
REC	Arthur Wolff	707	1.27	N/A
UL	Anastasie Leipp	1,821	3.27	−2.22
Turnout		55,633	97.93	+52.56
Registered electors		86,142		
2nd round result
LR	Patrick Hetzel	30,986	54.80	−9.23
RN	Denis Kieffer	25,558	45.20	+9.23
Turnout		56,544	96.77	+55.15
Registered electors		86,164		
LR hold		Swing		

=== 2022 ===
Legislative Election 2022: Bas-Rhin's 7th constituency
Party	Candidate	Votes	%	±%
LR (UDC)	Patrick Hetzel	13,445	35.01	+1.24
RN	Valérie Eschenmann	8,183	21.31	+6.56
MoDem (Ensemble)	Patrick Depyl	5,206	13.56	−14.14
LFI (NUPÉS)	Lou Toussaint	4,852	12.63	+1.56
UL (REG)	Jean-Marie Lorber	2,110	5.49	−3.06
DIV	Christophe Hecker	1,367	3.56	N/A
DVE	Dino Margarito	935	2.43	+1.43
Others	N/A	2,304	-	−
Turnout		38,402	45.67	−1.89
2nd round result
LR (UDC)	Patrick Hetzel	21,676	64.03	+1.42
RN	Valérie Eschenmann	12,177	35.97	N/A
Turnout		33,853	41.62	−0.20
LR hold				

=== 2017 ===
Results of the 11 June and 18 June 2017 French National Assembly election in Bas-Rhin’s 7th Constituency
Candidate	Party		1st round		2nd round	
Candidate	Party		Votes	%	Votes	%
Partick Hetzel	The Republicans	LR	13,463	33.77	20,836	62.61
Antoinette De Santis	La République En Marche!	LREM	10,643	26.70	12,445	37.39
Virginie Joron	National Front	FN	6,278	15.75		
Jean-Marie Lorber	Regionalist	REG	3,408	8.55		
Peter Andersen	La France Insoumise	FI	2,235	5.61		
Sandrine Lombard	Ecologist	ECO	1,740	4.37		
Pascale Elles	Debout la France	DLF	473	1.19		
Bénédicte Herrgott	Communist Party	PCF	436	1.09		
Natacha Ruiz	Ecologist	ECO	397	1.00		
Aurélien Hary	Independent	DIV	255	0.64		
Olivier Muller-Haenel	Independent	DIV	233	0.58		
Jeanne-Françoise Langlade	Far Left	EXG	202	0.51		
Mikaïl Kaya	Independent	DIV	99	0.25		
Total			39,862	100%	33,281	100%
Registered voters			85,519		85,427	
Blank/Void ballots			813	2.00%	2,447	6.84%
Turnout			40,675	47.56%	35,728	41.82%
Abstentions			44,844	52.44%	49,699	58.18%
Result					LR GAIN FROM UMP	

=== 2012 ===
Results of the 10 June and 17 June 2012 French National Assembly election in Bas-Rhin’s 7th Constituency
Candidate	Party		1st round		2nd round	
Candidate	Party		Votes	%	Votes	%
Patrick Hetzel	Union for a Popular Movement	UMP	14,518	31.43	21,431	57.31
Thierry Carbiener	Centrist Alliance	AC	9,477	20.51	16,026	42.79
Laurent Gnaedig	National Front	FN	8,609	18.64		
Michèle Comte	Europe Ecology - The Greens	EELV	5,665	12.26		
Denis Lieb	Regionalist	REG	4,457	9.65		
Bénédicte Herrgott	Left Front	FG	1,789	3.87		
Pierre Schweitzer	The Centre for France	CEN	872	1.89		
Anne-Marie Victor	Other	AUT	377	0.82		
Liliane Bas	Far Left	EXG	265	0.57		
Etienne Schmitt	Other	AUT	168	0.36		
Total			46,197	100%	37,457	100%
Registered voters			84,670		84,668	
Blank/Void ballots			841	1.79%	3,019	7.46%
Turnout			47,038	55.55%	40,476	%
Abstentions			37,632	44.45%	44,192	52.19%
Result					UMP HOLD	

=== 2007 ===
Emile Blessig was elected with more than 50% of the vote in the first round of voting, and therefore no second round took place.

Results of the 10 June and 17 June 2007 French National Assembly election in Bas-Rhin’s 7th Constituency
Candidate	Party		1st round	
Candidate	Party		Votes	%
Emile Blessig	Union for a Popular Movement	UMP	27,269	60.49
Thierry Carbiener	UDF-Democratic Movement	UDF-MoDem	6,592	14.62
Pascale Delorme	Socialist Party	PS	2,949	6.54
Robert Martig	National Front	FN	2,939	6.52
Marie Madeline Braud	The Greens	LV	2,171	4.82
Fabienne Schnitzler	Ecologist	ECO	741	1.64
Liliane Bas	Far Left	EXG	676	1.50
Hervé Therouse	Miscellaneous Left	DVG	526	1.17
Georges Hoffmann	Far Left	EXG	470	1.04
Yves Queneville	Independent	DIV	425	0.94
Evelyne Hamm	Far Right	EXD	322	0.71
Total			45,080	100%
Registered voters			82,832	
Blank/Void ballots			1,132	2.45%
Turnout			46,212	55.79%
Abstentions			36,620	%
Result			UMP GAIN	

=== 2002 ===
Emile Blessig was elected with more than 50% of the vote in the first round of voting, and therefore no second round took place.

Results of the 9 June and 16 June 2002 French National Assembly election in Bas-Rhin’s 7th Constituency
Candidate	Party		1st round	
Candidate	Party		Votes	%
Emile Blessig	Union for French Democracy	UDF	24,612	54.55
Nicolas Olszak	Socialist Party	PS	7,154	15.86
Antoine Kraemer	National Front	FN	5,792	12.84
Rene Weess	National Republican Movement	MNR	3,295	7.30
Mathieu Fichter	The Greens	LV	1,405	3.11
A. Marie Traore	Workers’ Struggle	LO	555	1.23
Maryse Retali	Ecologist	ECO	528	1.17
Sylvie Lohr	Revolutionary Communist League	LCR	512	1.13
Robert Hoppe	Ecologist	ECO	440	0.98
Jacky Dudt	Communist Party	PCF	426	0.94
Pascal Dupaix	Miscellaneous Right	DVD	401	0.89
Total			45,120	100%
Registered voters			78,653	
Blank/Void ballots			1,241	2.68%
Turnout			46,361	58.94%
Abstentions			32,292	41.06%
Result			UDF GAIN	
