= Corenc =

- Commune
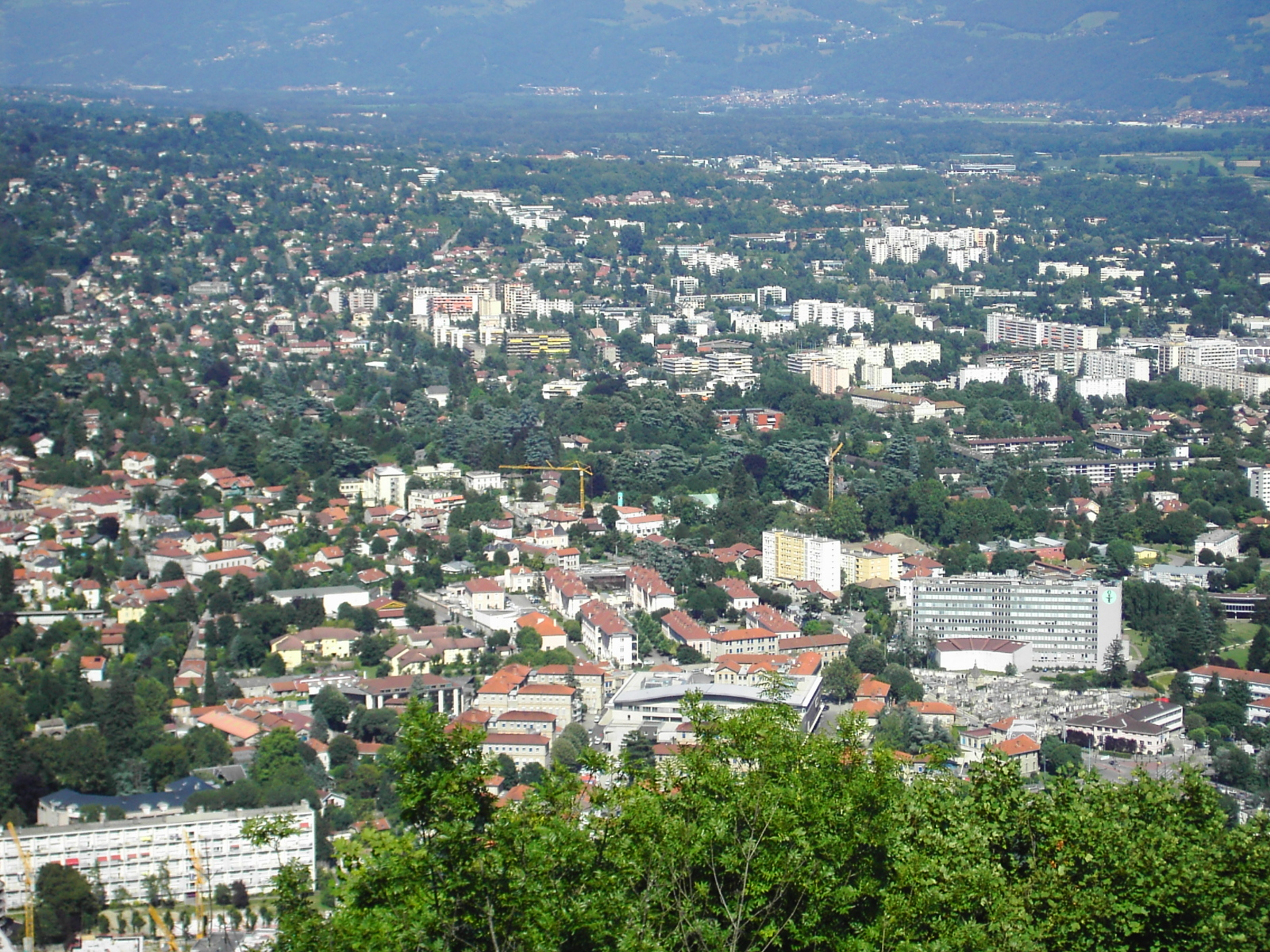
- Corenc is in the background; in the foreground is La Tronche

- Coat of arms
- Location of Corenc
- Location within France Location within Auvergne-Rhône-Alpes
- Coordinates: 45°12′44″N 5°45′05″E
- Country: France
- Region: Auvergne-Rhône-Alpes
- Department: Isère
- Arrondissement: Grenoble
- Canton: Meylan
- Intercommunality: Grenoble-Alpes Métropole

Government
  - Mayor (2020–2026): Jean-Damien Mermillod-Blondin
- Area^{1}: 6.5 km^{2} (2.5 sq mi)
- Elevation: 467 m (1,532 ft)
- Highest elevation: 1,328 m (4,357 ft)
- Lowest elevation: 221 m (725 ft)
- Population (2023): 4,215
  - Density: 650/km^{2} (1,700/sq mi)
- Time zone: UTC+01:00 (CET)
  - Summer (DST): UTC+02:00 (CEST)
- INSEE/Postal code: 38126 /38700
- ^{1} French Land Register data, which excludes lakes, ponds, glaciers > 1 km^{2} (0.386 sq mi or 247 acres) and river estuaries.

Corenc (French pronunciation: [kɔʁɑ̃]) is a commune in the département of Isère in southeastern France. It is part of the Grenoble urban unit (agglomeration).

== Geography ==
Corenc is situated in the Alps near the center of the département of Isère.

== Population ==
Historical population

Year	Pop.	±% p.a.
1793	479	—
1800	498	+0.56%
1806	552	+1.73%
1821	586	+0.40%
1831	568	−0.31%
1836	575	+0.25%
1841	709	+4.28%
1846	779	+1.90%
1851	807	+0.71%
1856	591	−6.04%
1861	739	+4.57%
1866	864	+3.17%
1872	701	−3.42%
1876	941	+7.64%
1881	927	−0.30%
1886	1,010	+1.73%
1891	901	−2.26%
1896	888	−0.29%
1901	895	+0.16%

Year	Pop.	±% p.a.
1906	583	−8.22%
1911	806	+6.69%
1921	767	−0.49%
1926	971	+4.83%
1931	1,156	+3.55%
1936	1,518	+5.60%
1946	1,738	+1.36%
1954	2,508	+4.69%
1962	2,510	+0.01%
1968	2,850	+2.14%
1975	3,029	+0.87%
1982	3,138	+0.51%
1990	3,356	+0.84%
1999	3,856	+1.56%
2007	3,773	−0.27%
2012	3,944	+0.89%
2017	4,013	+0.35%
2023	4,215	+0.82%

Source: EHESS and INSEE (1968-2023)

== Economy ==
In 2007, Corenc's per capita income of €30,742 was the highest of any commune of France outside of the Paris region, and was nearly double the national average of €15,849.

== See also ==
- Mélanie Calvat
