= Émile Blessig =

French politician (1947–2025)

Member of the National Assembly for Bas-Rhin's 7th constituency
- In office 15 June 1998 – 19 June 2012
- Preceded by: Adrien Zeller
- Succeeded by: Patrick Hetzel

Mayor of Saverne
- In office 16 March 2008 – 13 March 2013
- Preceded by: Thierry Carbiener
- Succeeded by: Stéphane Leyenberger

Personal details
- Born: Émile Charles Louis Blessig; 27 May 1947 Saverne, France
- Died: 21 March 2025 (aged 77) Saverne, France
- Party: UMP
- Profession: Lawyer

Émile Blessig (27 May 1947 – 21 March 2025) was a French lawyer and politician who was a member of the National Assembly of France. He represented the 7th constituency of the Bas-Rhin department from 1998 to 2012 as a member of the Union for a Popular Movement.

== Political career ==
=== Member of the National Assembly ===
Blessig was elected as a member of the National Assembly of France, representing the 7th constituency of the Bas-Rhin department. He served from 15 June 1998 to 19 June 2012. As a member of the Union for a Popular Movement (UMP), a major center-right political party, Blessig focused on various legislative issues, including economic development, social justice, and regional planning. He was known for his ability to work across party lines and his dedication to the needs of his constituents.

=== Mayor of Saverne ===
In addition to his role in the National Assembly, Blessig served as the Mayor of Saverne from 16 March 2008 to 13 March 2013. His tenure as mayor was characterized by significant infrastructure developments, improvements in public services, and efforts to boost local economic growth. Blessig's leadership style was hands-on and community-focused, earning him widespread respect and admiration.

== Death ==
Blessig died on 21 March 2025 in his hometown at the age of 77.

== Mandates and functions ==
=== National mandates ===
2002–2007: Deputy of the 7th constituency of Bas-Rhin

1998–2002: Deputy of the 7th constituency of Bas-Rhin

2007–2012: Deputy of the 7th constituency of Bas-Rhin

President of the Association for the Promotion and Federation of Regions (APFP)

=== Departmental mandates ===
2004–2008: General Councilor of Bas-Rhin

1998–2004: General Councilor of Bas-Rhin

1992–1998: General Councilor of Bas-Rhin

1988–1992: General Councilor of Bas-Rhin

=== Local mandates ===
1992–1998: President of the Community of Communes of Saverne

1995–2001: Municipal Councilor of Saverne

1989–1995: Deputy Mayor of Saverne

2008–2013: Mayor of Saverne
