= Isère's 1st constituency =

Constituency of the National Assembly of France

1st constituency of Isère
- inline Constituency of the National Assembly of France

- Constituency in Department

- Isère in France
- Deputy: Camille Galliard-Minier; RE
- Department: Isère
- Cantons: Grenoble-1, Grenoble-2, Grenoble-4, Meylan, Saint-Ismier
- Registered voters: 131,869

The 1st constituency of Isère is a French legislative constituency in the Isère département.

== Deputies ==
Election	Member	Party	Notes
1988	Alain Carignon	RPR	
1993	Alain Carignon	RPR	
1997	Richard Cazenave	RPR	
2002	Richard Cazenave	UMP	
2007	Geneviève Fioraso	PS	
2012	Geneviève Fioraso	PS	
2017	Olivier Véran	LREM	
2020	Camille Galliard-Minier	LREM	substitute for Olivier Véran, who was appointed Minister of Health and Solidarity
2022	Olivier Véran	RE	
2024	Hugo Prevost	LFI	
2025	Camille Galliard-Minier	RE	

== Election results ==
=== 2025 by-election ===
Candidate	Party	Alliance	First round			Second round		
Candidate	Party	Alliance	Votes	%	+/–	Votes	%	+/–
Lyes Louffok	LFI	NFP	8,495	28.33	-11.86	11,211	35.72	-6.63
Camille Galliard-Minier	REN	Ensemble	7,966	26.57	-7.05	20,171	64.28	+24.04
Nathalie Béranger	LR	UDC	5,028	16.77	+9.79			
Alexandre Lacroix	LR-RN	UXD	3,325	11.09	-7.25			
Hervé Gerbi	DVC		2,313	7.71	new			
Gaëlle Offranc-Piret	ECO		2,279	7.60	new			
Rémi Adam	LO		220	0.73	-0.13			
Baptiste Anglade	NPA		174	0.58	new			
François-Marie Périer	DIV		131	0.44	new			
Martine Jarry	PT		48	0.16	new			
Matthieu Le Morzellec	DIV		2	0.01	new			
Votes			29,981	100.00		31,382	100.00	
Valid votes			29,981	98.33	-0.24	31,382	96.48	-1.79
Blank votes			391	1.28	+0.22	839	2.58	-1.28
Null votes			117	0.38	+0.01	307	0.94	+0.51
Turnout			30,489	35.86	-40.00	32,528	38.25	-37.42
Abstentions			54,531	64.41	+40.00	52,511	61.75	+37.42
Registered voters			85,020			85,039		
Result			RE GAIN FROM LFI					

=== 2024 ===
Candidate	Party	Alliance	First round			Second round		
Candidate	Party	Alliance	Votes	%	+/–	Votes	%	+/–
Hugo Prevost	LFI	NFP	25,207	40.19	+3.33	26,438	42.35	-2.12
Olivier Véran	REN	Ensemble	21,089	33.62	-6.88	25,120	40.24	-15.29
Alexandre Lacroix	LR-RN	UXD	11,504	18.34	new	10,865	17.41	new
Nathalie Béranger	LR	UDC	4,379	6.98	+0.31			
Rémi Adam	LO		541	0.86	+0.08			
Votes			62,720	100.00		62,423	100.00	
Valid votes			62,720	98.57	+0.04	62,423	98.27	+2.29
Blank votes			675	1.06	-0.01	826	1.30	-1.75
Null votes			237	0.37	-0.03	274	0.43	-0.53
Turnout			63,632	75.86	+18.70	63,523	75.67	+19.85
Abstentions			20,247	24.14	-18.70	20,423	24.33	-19.85
Registered voters			83,879			83,946		
Result			LFI GAIN FROM LREM					

=== 2022 ===
Legislative Election 2022: Isère's 1st constituency
Party	Candidate	Votes	%	±%
LREM (Ensemble)	Olivier Véran	19,543	40.50	-6.71
LFI (NUPÉS)	Salomé Robin	17,785	36.86	+15.88
RN	Aurore Meyrieux	3,407	7.06	+0.78
LR (UDC)	Brigitte Boer	3,217	6.67	−10.98
REC	Marine Chiaberto	2,326	4.82	N/A
Others	N/A	1,974		
Turnout		48,252	57.16	+1.57
2nd round result
LREM (Ensemble)	Olivier Véran	25,512	55.53	-12.56
LFI (NUPÉS)	Salomé Robin	20,427	44.47	N/A
Turnout		45,939	55.82	+10.12
LREM hold				

=== 2017 ===
Candidate	Label	First round		Second round	
Candidate	Label	Votes	%	Votes	%
Olivier Véran	REM	21,572	47.21	23,212	68.09
Jean-Damien Mermillod-Blondin	UDI	8,067	17.65	10,878	31.91
Elsa Régis	FI	4,795	10.49		
Nicolas Kada	ECO	4,132	9.04		
Marie de Kervéréguin	FN	2,868	6.28		
Éric Grasset	PRG	1,797	3.93		
Nathalie Veyret	PCF	664	1.45		
Lautaro Labrin	DVG	340	0.74		
Séverine Friol	DIV	238	0.52		
Marianne Prévost	EXG	237	0.52		
Annick Clavier	DVG	234	0.51		
Youssef Essabity	DVG	212	0.46		
Frédéric Balcerzak	DIV	203	0.44		
Rémi Adam	EXG	197	0.43		
Bernard Zamora	ECO	142	0.31		
Votes		45,698	100.00	34,090	100.00
Valid votes		45,698	98.83	34,090	89.67
Blank votes		448	0.97	3,225	8.48
Null votes		94	0.20	702	1.85
Turnout		46,240	55.59	38,017	45.70
Abstentions		36,942	44.41	45,163	54.30
Registered voters		83,182		83,180	
Source: Ministry of the Interior

=== 2012 ===
2012 legislative election in Isere's 1st constituency
Candidate	Party	First round		Second round	
Candidate	Party	Votes	%	Votes	%
Geneviève Fioraso	PS	18,892	38.31%	26,403	58.34%
Jean-Claude Peyrin	UMP	8,781	17.80%	18,854	41.66%
Marie-Christine Tardy	UMP dissident	8,185	16.60%		
Eric Piolle	EELV	3,814	7.73%		
Mireille D'Ornano	FN	3,776	7.66%		
Alain Dontaine	FG	3,198	6.48%		
Philippe De Longevialle	AC	1,306	2.65%		
Niels Nauche	??	314	0.64%		
Fanny Lortat-Jacob	??	277	0.56%		
Solange Ferrara	AEI	239	0.48%		
Cécile Allibe	NPA	208	0.42%		
Valentin Radlo	DR	120	0.24%		
Rémi Adam	LO	109	0.22%		
Vincent Huor	SP	59	0.12%		
Maxime Couraud	PP	40	0.08%		
Valid votes		49,318	99.24%	45,256	97.02%
Spoilt and null votes		377	0.76%	1,391	2.98%
Votes cast / turnout		49,695	62.28%	46,647	58.38%
Abstentions		30,100	37.72%	33,253	41.62%
Registered voters		79,795	100.00%	79,900	100.00%

=== 2007 ===
Legislative Election 2007: Isère's 1st constituency
Party	Candidate	Votes	%	±%
PS	Geneviève Fioraso	15,876	32.02	
UMP	Alain Carignon	10,638	21.45	
DVD	Richard Cazenave	9,731	19.62	
MoDem	Philippe de Longevialle	5,132	10.35	
LV	Marie-Odile Novelli	3,235	6.52	
Others	N/A	4,977		
Turnout		50,195	63.12	
2nd round result
PS	Geneviève Fioraso	29,184	63.03	
UMP	Alain Carignon	17,115	36.97	
Turnout		49,588	62.36	
PS gain from UMP				

=== 2002 ===
Legislative Election 2002: Isère's 1st constituency
Party	Candidate	Votes	%	±%
UMP	Richard Cazenave	19,543	38.22	
PS	Annie Deschamps	15,898	31.10	
DVD	Christian Sartorius	3,118	6.10	
FN	Michele Baud	3,096	6.06	
LV	Marie-Odile Novelli	3,031	5.93	
DVD	Pierre Gimel	1,851	3.62	
Others	N/A	4,590		
Turnout		51,709	69.11	
2nd round result
UMP	Richard Cazenave	25,454	54.23	
PS	Annie Deschamps	21,480	45.77	
Turnout		48,051	64.22	
UMP hold				

=== 1997 ===
Legislative Election 1997: Isère's 1st constituency
Party	Candidate	Votes	%	±%
RPR	Richard Cazenave	16,428	35.84	
PS	Annie Deschamps	11,816	25.78	
FN	Hugues Petit	5,027	10.97	
LV	Raymond Avrillier	3,320	7.24	
PCF	Marie-France Monnery	2,235	4.88	
DVD	Christian Sartorius	1,736	3.79	
GE	Daniel Michelon	1,146	2.50	
DIV	Herve Galley	990	2.16	
LO	Chantal Gomez	989	2.16	
Others	N/A	2,151		
Turnout		47,317	64.11	
2nd round result
RPR	Richard Cazenave	26,261	53.12	
PS	Annie Deschamps	23,177	46.88	
Turnout		51,480	69.75	
RPR hold				

== Sources ==
- "Résultats électoraux officiels en France" (in French). 2012.
- "Résultats électoraux officiels en France" (in French). 2007.
