= Inovallée =

Science park in Isère, France

Coordinates: 45.2097°N 5.7972°E

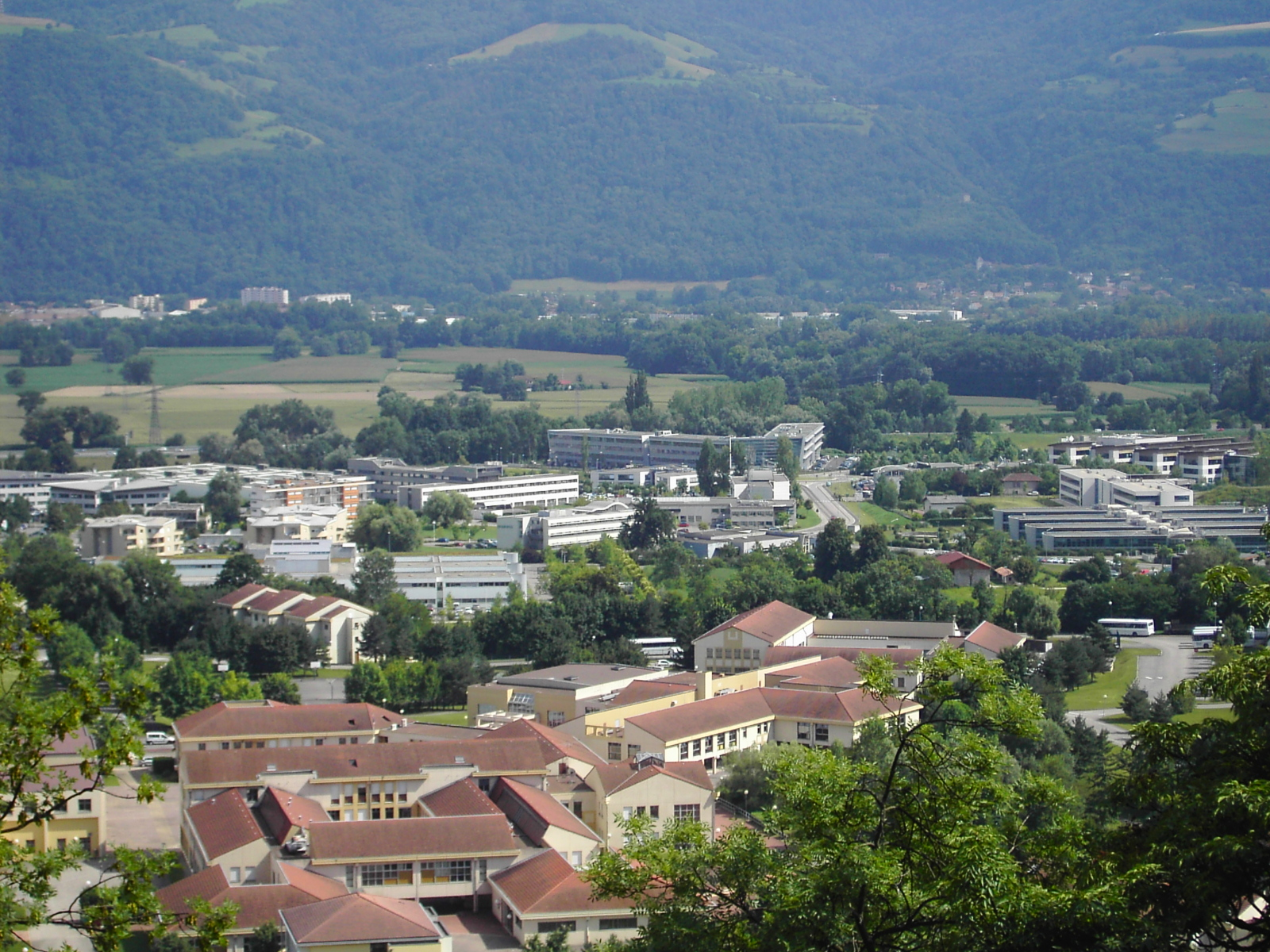
Inovallee -Montbonnot

Inovallée (contraction in French for the words innovation and valley) is a science park located at Meylan and Montbonnot-Saint-Martin near Grenoble in France.

Created in 1972 with the acronym ZIRST, it became Inovallée in 2005 and primarily houses companies in the fields of information and communications technology. In 2014, there were more than 362 companies and 11,174 people working in the park.

Inovallée also benefits from the close proximity of the Université Grenoble Alpes, Grenoble Institute of Technology and the Polygone Scientifique.

== Companies and institutions ==
The major companies located at Inovallée are Naver Labs Europe, Orange labs, Dolphin Integration, Mirantis, Schneider Electric, Salesforce.com and also the French Institute for Research in Computer Science and Automation.
