= Ministry of Higher Education and Research (France) =

French governmental ministry

Minister of Higher Education and Research and Space of Ministry of Higher Education and Research and Space
- Ministère de l’Enseignement Supérieur et de la Recherche et de l'Espace

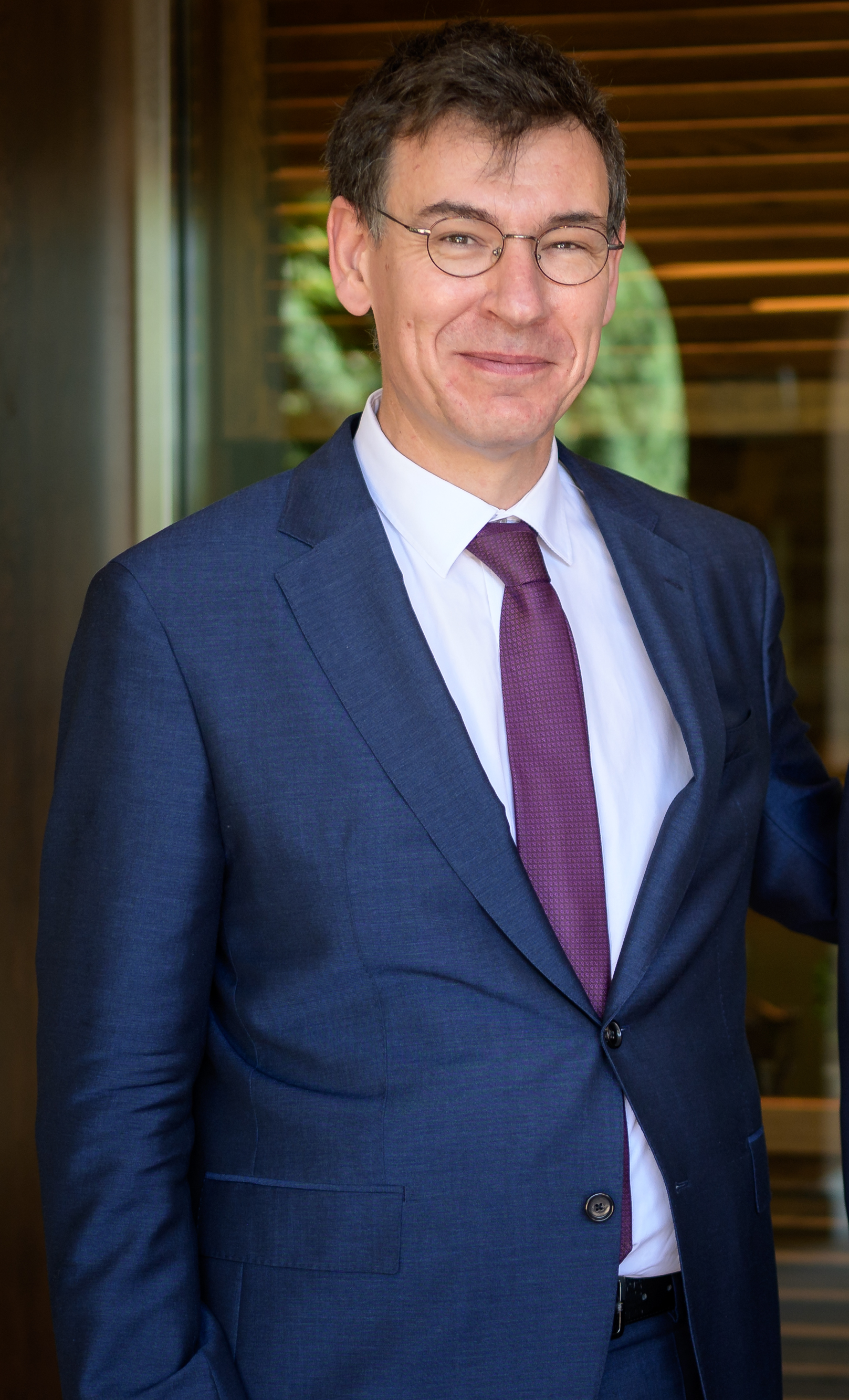
- Incumbent; Philippe Baptiste since 23 December 2024
- Ministry of Higher Education and Research
- Member of: Cabinet
- Reports to: President of the Republic; Prime Minister
- Residence: Pavillon Boncourt
- Seat: 21 rue Descartes, 75005 Paris
- Nominator: Prime Minister
- Appointer: Prime Minister
- Term length: No fixed term
- Formation: 1936
- First holder: Irène Joliot-Curie
- Website: https://www.enseignementsup-recherche.gouv.fr/fr

The Ministry of Higher Education and Research and Space (French: ministère de l’Enseignement Supérieur et de la Recherche et de l'Espace, or MESRE), formerly associated with the portfolio of Innovation, Technical Progress, and Atomic and Space Affairs, is the cabinet member in the Government of France responsible for implementing the Government's policy in the fields of research and technology, access to and development of higher education, regulation of access to higher education, and vocational training. It also coordinates the promotion of science and technology, as well as the dissemination of scientific, technological, and industrial culture.

The development of scientific research holds a central place in the French Government's policy: the Fourth Plan (1962–1965) marked the “official recognition of the importance of Research at the top of the hierarchy of factors governing the Nation’s development.” The Ministry is responsible for implementing the Research Programming Act.

The Ministry was established in 1936 under the name Sub-secretariat for Scientific Research, first entrusted to Irène Joliot-Curie and then to Jean Perrin within the Socialist Front Populaire government, but it was dissolved in June 1937. Two years later, the government founded the National Council for Scientific Research, dedicated to the encouragement and promotion of scientific research.

The Ministry was re-established in 1954 under the cabinet of Pierre Mendès-France, focusing on technical progress. It was later associated with Atomic Energy under Charles de Gaulle, with Industry under Presidents Pompidou and Mitterrand, and with National Education from 1993 onwards.

The Ministry of Research was responsible for the development of the Commissariat for Atomic Energy (1945), the implementation of the Plan Calcul (1963), the Ariane space exploration programme (1973), and the Research Programming Act (2021).

Since 23 December 2024, the Minister for Higher Education and Research is Philippe Baptiste, former president of the National Centre for Space Studies (Centre national d’études spatiales), serving in the Bayrou government.

== Name ==
The delegated ministry has had various names over the years, depending on the era and the government in power:

- 1936-1937: Under-Secretary of State for Scientific Research
- 1954: Secretary of State for Scientific Research and Technical Progress
- 1959-1974: Ministers responsible for Scientific Research
- 1974-1977: Minister for Industry and Research
- 1977-1981: Secretary of State reporting to the Prime Minister
- 1981-1992: Minister of State, Minister for Research, Industry, and Technology
- 1992-1993: Minister for Research and Space
- 1993-1995: Minister for National Education, Higher Education, and Research
- 1995-1997: Secretary of State for Research
- 1997-2000: Minister for National Education, Research, and Technology
- 2002-2014: “Super-ministry” – Minister for Youth, National Education, and Research
- 2014: Secretary of State for Higher Education and Research
- 2017-2024: Minister for Higher Education, Research, and Innovation
- 2024: Minister responsible for Higher Education and Research, reporting to the Minister of State for National Education
- 2025: Minister for Higher Education and Research and Space

== History ==
Scientific research in France has historically been closely tied to the public authorities. During the French Revolution, the royal universities — deemed too corporatist and too closely associated with the monarchy — were abolished and replaced by public grandes écoles, which were controlled and funded by the State. With the Revolution, the French State began to recognise the importance of universities and higher education. Napoleon centralised the universities between 1808 and 1815.

In 1880, the Ferry Law established the State’s monopoly over the awarding of university degrees in France: private higher education institutions were thus prohibited from using the term “university.” This restriction remains in effect today, which explains why such institutions are officially referred to as Catholic institutes, even though the term “Catholic university” has become commonly used.

Under the Third Republic, higher education experienced significant growth: by the end of the 19th century, there were 24,000 students enrolled in faculties (including 9,000 in private Catholic faculties). In 1885, state faculties were granted legal personality and obtained their own budgets by 1890. The republican regime placed great importance on public education — not only to promote scientific progress, but also to transmit such progress to industry. By 1896, France had fifteen universities, the most important being those in Paris, Lyon, Montpellier, and Aix-en-Provence. In line with the Law on the Separation of Church and State, universities were secularised, and theology chairs were abolished in 1905.

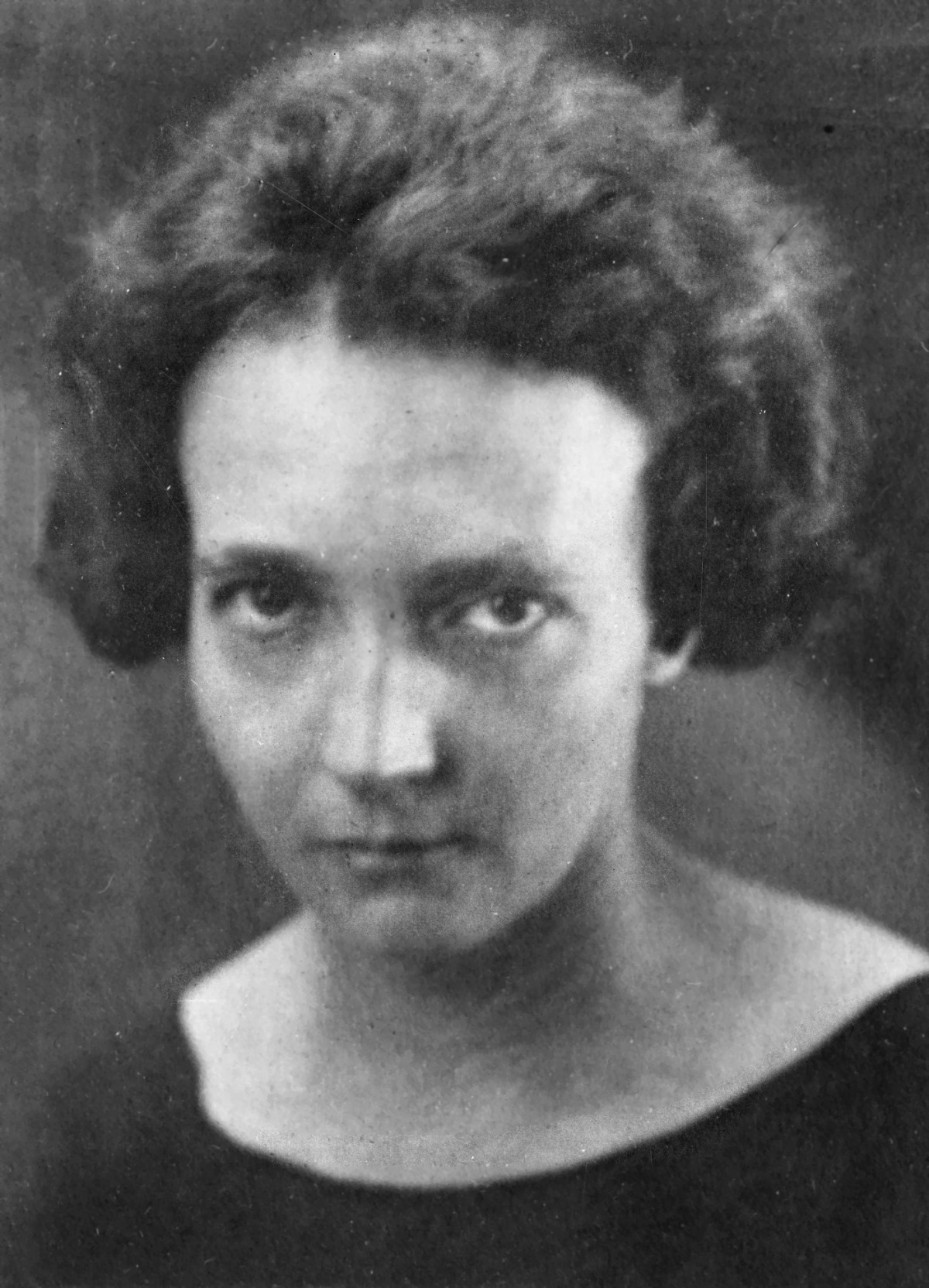
Physicist Irène Joliot-Curie, first holder of the research portfolio in France

The State played an active role in establishing the first scientific research centres: in 1901, the Scientific Research Fund (Caisse des recherches scientifiques) was created, followed in 1915 by the Directorate of Inventions (Direction des Inventions), in cooperation with the Ministry of War. In 1917, a short-lived Undersecretariat for Inventions (Sous-Secrétariat aux Inventions) was established. In 1930, the National Science Fund was created to provide scholarships to researchers — the first public funding scheme for researchers in France. These bodies were not full ministries, but worked in coordination with government services. The State's interest in scientific research became official in spring 1936, with the creation by the Socialist government of Léon Blum of the Undersecretariat for Scientific Research, entrusted to scientists Irène Joliot-Curie and Jean Perrin. Though short-lived, it was followed by the creation of the High Committee for the Coordination of Scientific Research in May 1938, tasked with coordinating all research and scientific work. Finally, in 1939, the National Centre for Scientific Research (Conseil National pour la Recherche Scientifique, CNRS) was established to “coordinate the activity of laboratories in order to increase the productivity of scientific research.”

After the Second World War, the development of fundamental research was made a national priority, as France was undergoing reconstruction. In the early years of the Fifth Republic, the research budget increased significantly, reaching 2.2% of GDP in the 1960s. This effort dropped to 1.7% of GDP in the 1970s. Successive governments continued to prioritise fundamental research, though the status of universities — still closely tied to the public authorities — remained largely unchanged. Between 1954 and 1974, the Ministry was responsible for technical progress and atomic energy before being placed under the supervision of the Ministry of Industry until 1995.

The events of May 1968 led to a major overhaul of French universities. The student protests began on 22 March 1968 with the sequestration of the Dean of the University of Nanterre by students protesting against the ban on visiting female dormitories, as well as expressing opposition to the Vietnam War. The movement spread rapidly across the country. The Faure Law restructured the university system, granting autonomy to universities, establishing councils that now included students, and definitively ending the idea of selection at university entrance—only the baccalauréat (the secondary school leaving qualification) was required for admission. In several university cities, faculties declared themselves autonomous and adopted more democratic statutes. In Paris, the University of Vincennes, founded in autumn 1968, became a stronghold of the political left. Notable figures teaching there included Gilles Deleuze (who gave a course on Nihilism and Protest), Daniel Bensaïd (a seminar on the nature of workers’ States), Alain Badiou (on Science and Class Struggle), and Henri Weber (on Sino-Soviet relations and Maoism). Michel Foucault chaired the Department of Philosophy. Amid rivalries among various factions of the French left at the time (Maoists, Trotskyists, Communists), the university of Vincennes — labelled the “enfant terrible of May ’68” — was ultimately dismantled in 1980.

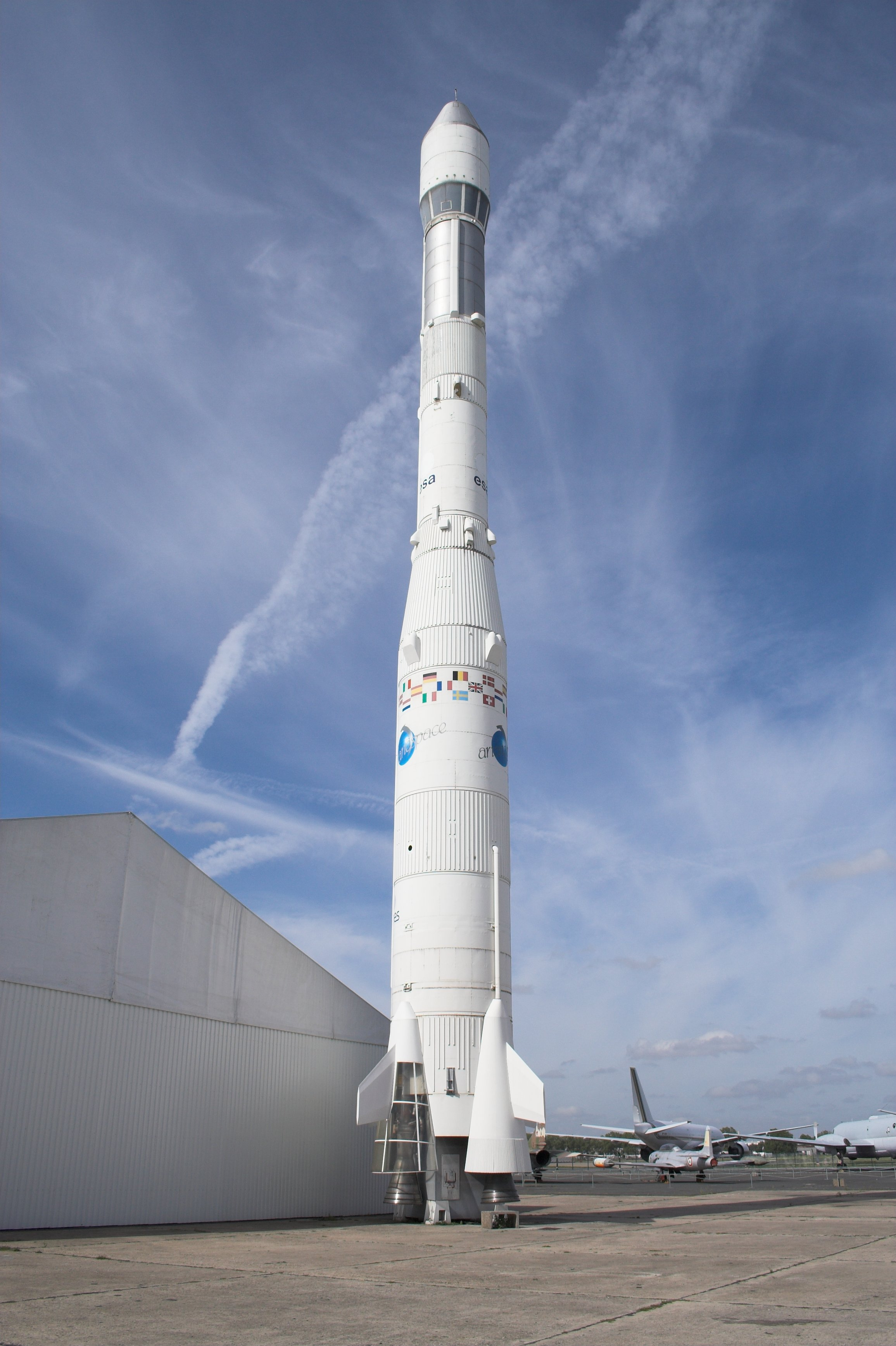
Rocket Ariane 1, launched in 1979 as part of the Arianespace programme

In 1986, the Devaquet bill, which sought to introduce selection at university level, triggered mass student protests, joined by secondary school pupils. At the time, France was in a period of political cohabitation: Socialist President François Mitterrand and conservative Prime Minister Jacques Chirac. President Mitterrand openly opposed the bill, declaring himself "on the same wavelength as the striking students" and expressing admiration for their "maturity." The movement culminated in the police killing of Malik Oussekine, and the proposed law was subsequently withdrawn.

In 1982, the research portfolio was entrusted to the Minister for Industry, Jean-Pierre Chevènement. Under President François Mitterrand (1981–1995), research was made a national priority, as he declared in January 1982 during the General Assembly on Research (États Généraux de la Recherche):

"In his work on the history of Western capitalism, Fernand Braudel shows that no society has ever survived unless it was able to bring together in a mysterious alchemy the talents of researchers, the will of politicians, and the enterprising spirit of workers."

This policy was reflected in initiatives such as the launch of the EUREKA project for technological Europe, support for innovation in small and medium-sized enterprises, and backing for projects such as the crewed space station and the Ariane and Hermès programmes. In 1981, the Industrial Agreements for Training through Research (Conventions industrielles de formation par la recherche, or Cifre) were launched. These enable companies to receive financial support for hiring young PhD students whose research work, supervised by a public research laboratory, leads to a doctoral thesis. The programme is still in place today, with 1,500 projects in 2020 and a target, set by the 2021 Research Programming Act, of reaching 2,150 Cifre per year by 2027.

In 1992, the responsibilities of Research Minister Hubert Curien were expanded to include Space. Between 1995 and 1997, the portfolio for space research was transferred to the Minister for Telecommunications and Posts. In 1993, research was placed under the permanent supervision of the Ministry of National Education: François Fillon became the first “Minister for National Education, Higher Education and Research.” Thereafter, the position was usually held by a delegated minister.

In 2005, under President Jacques Chirac, the government founded the Industrial Innovation Agency (Agence pour l'Innovation Industrielle) with the aim of:

"Steering our industrial fabric towards high-tech sectors, the sectors that will generate the jobs of tomorrow... Just as the State did with Airbus, Ariane, and nuclear energy, it is once again giving itself the means to launch major projects for the future."

The aim was to raise research spending to 3% of GDP.

== Administration ==
Since 1981, the delegated Ministry for Higher Education and Research has been based in the former École Polytechnique building, located in the 5th arrondissement of Paris, within the Boncourt Pavilion. The site was home to the Collège de Boncourt as early as 1353, later housed the École Polytechnique from 1805 to 1976, and was subsequently allocated to the ministry’s departments from 1981 onwards.

The Minister for Higher Education and Research holds authority over the General Directorate for Higher Education and Professional Integration, the General Directorate for Research and Innovation, and the ministerial office. Together with the Minister of National Education, they share authority over the General Secretariat, the General Inspectorate of Education, Sport, and Research, the National Education and Higher Education Ombudsman, the senior defense and security official, and the ministerial internal audit mission
