= Domène =

- Commune
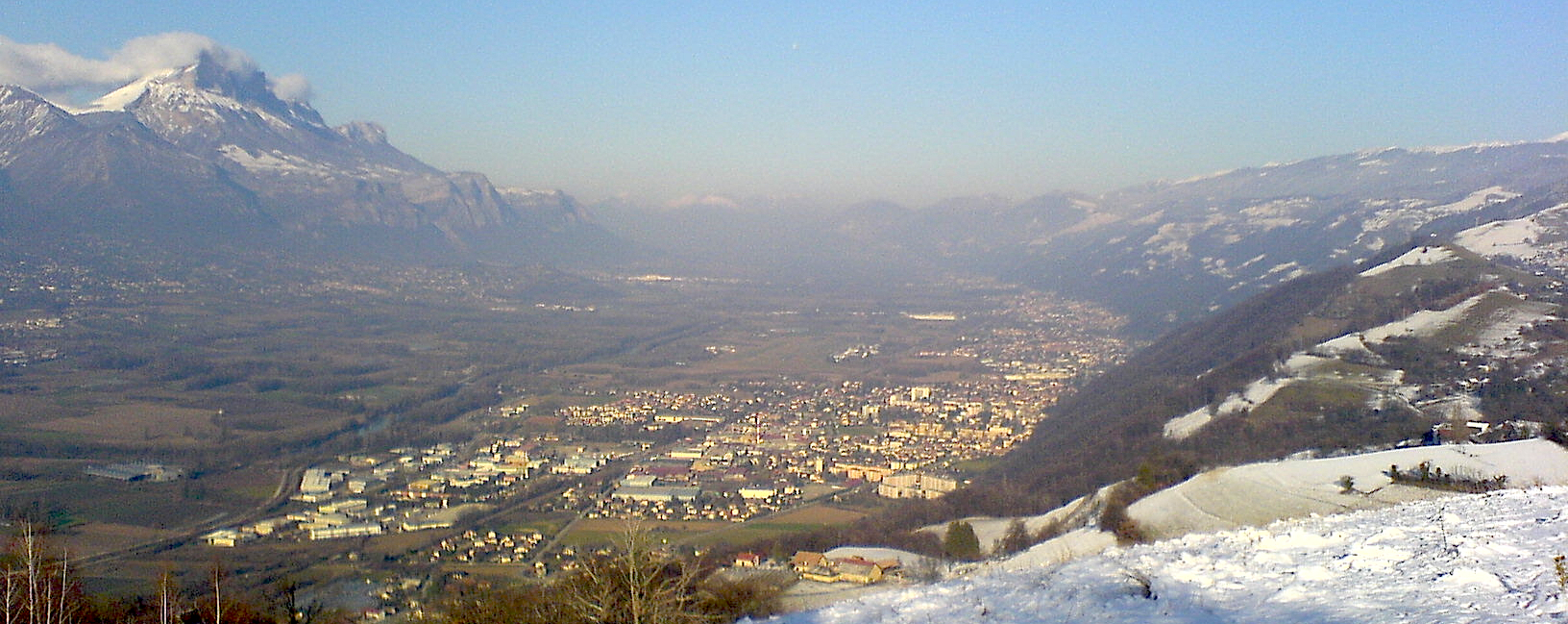
- A general view of Domène

- Coat of arms
- Location of Domène
- Location within France Location within Auvergne-Rhône-Alpes
- Coordinates: 45°12′12″N 5°50′23″E
- Country: France
- Region: Auvergne-Rhône-Alpes
- Department: Isère
- Arrondissement: Grenoble
- Canton: Meylan
- Intercommunality: Grenoble-Alpes Métropole

Government
  - Mayor (2020–2026): Chrystel Bayon
- Area^{1}: 5.29 km^{2} (2.04 sq mi)
- Highest elevation: 520 m (1,710 ft)
- Lowest elevation: 214 m (702 ft)
- Population (2023): 6,835
  - Density: 1,290/km^{2} (3,350/sq mi)
- Time zone: UTC+01:00 (CET)
  - Summer (DST): UTC+02:00 (CEST)
- INSEE/Postal code: 38150 /38420
- ^{1} French Land Register data, which excludes lakes, ponds, glaciers > 1 km^{2} (0.386 sq mi or 247 acres) and river estuaries.

Domène (French pronunciation: [dɔmˈɛn]) is a commune in the Isère department in southeastern France. It is part of the Grenoble urban unit (agglomeration).

== Population ==
Historical population

Year	Pop.	±% p.a.
1793	1,038	—
1800	1,231	+2.47%
1806	1,236	+0.07%
1821	1,204	−0.17%
1831	1,584	+2.78%
1836	1,589	+0.06%
1841	1,554	−0.44%
1846	1,478	−1.00%
1851	1,375	−1.43%
1856	1,395	+0.29%
1861	1,393	−0.03%
1866	1,620	+3.07%
1872	1,484	−1.45%
1876	1,719	+3.74%
1881	1,915	+2.18%
1886	1,906	−0.09%
1891	1,987	+0.84%
1896	1,878	−1.12%
1901	1,853	−0.27%

Year	Pop.	±% p.a.
1906	1,844	−0.10%
1911	1,919	+0.80%
1921	2,173	+1.25%
1926	2,459	+2.50%
1931	2,767	+2.39%
1936	2,765	−0.01%
1946	2,759	−0.02%
1954	3,418	+2.71%
1962	4,372	+3.12%
1968	4,901	+1.92%
1975	5,297	+1.12%
1982	5,308	+0.03%
1990	5,775	+1.06%
1999	6,399	+1.15%
2007	6,562	+0.31%
2012	6,588	+0.08%
2017	6,745	+0.47%
2023	6,835	+0.22%

Source: EHESS and INSEE (1968-2023)

== Twin towns ==
Domène is twinned with:

- Vedano al Lambro, Italy
- Mühlhausen-Ehingen, Germany

== See also ==
- Communes of the Isère department
