= Le Sappey-en-Chartreuse =

- Commune
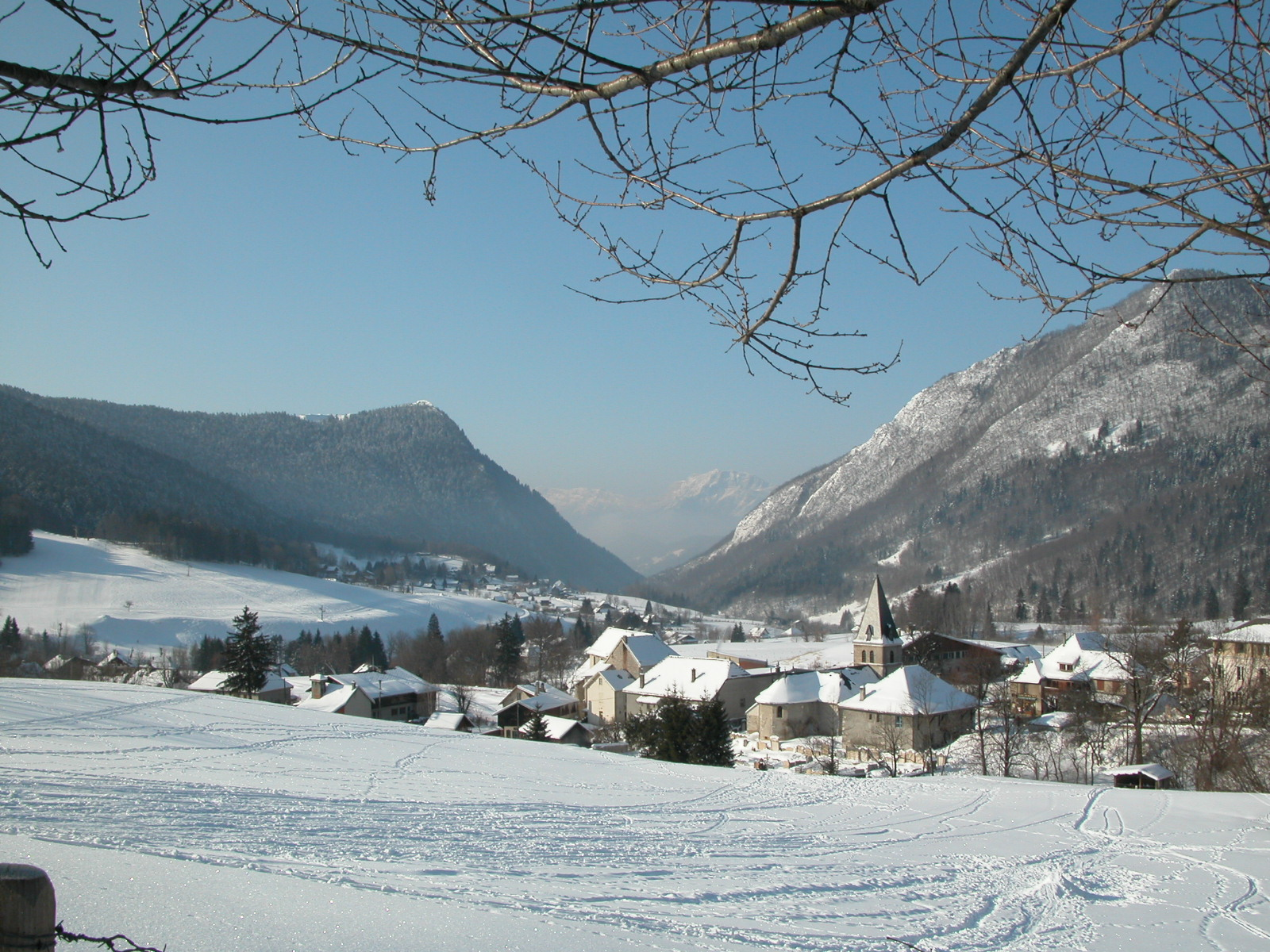
- A general view of Le Sappey-en-Chartreuse in winter
- Location of Le Sappey-en-Chartreuse
- Location within France Location within Auvergne-Rhône-Alpes
- Coordinates: 45°15′48″N 5°46′44″E
- Country: France
- Region: Auvergne-Rhône-Alpes
- Department: Isère
- Arrondissement: Grenoble
- Canton: Meylan
- Intercommunality: Grenoble-Alpes Métropole

Government
  - Mayor (2020–2026): Dominique Escaron
- Area^{1}: 15.13 km^{2} (5.84 sq mi)
- Elevation: 1,014 m (3,327 ft)
- Highest elevation: 2,079 m (6,821 ft)
- Lowest elevation: 840 m (2,760 ft)
- Population (2023): 1,191
  - Density: 78.72/km^{2} (203.9/sq mi)
- Time zone: UTC+01:00 (CET)
  - Summer (DST): UTC+02:00 (CEST)
- INSEE/Postal code: 38471 /38700
- ^{1} French Land Register data, which excludes lakes, ponds, glaciers > 1 km^{2} (0.386 sq mi or 247 acres) and river estuaries.

Le Sappey-en-Chartreuse (French pronunciation: [lə sapɛ ɑ̃ ʃaʁtʁøz], lit. 'Le Sappey in Chartreuse') is a commune in the Isère department in southeastern France.

== Population ==
Historical population
Year	Pop.	±% p.a.
1968	285	—
1975	371	+3.84%
1982	557	+5.98%
1990	762	+4.00%
1999	942	+2.38%
2007	1,026	+1.07%
2012	1,101	+1.42%
2017	1,121	+0.36%
2023	1,191	+1.01%
Source: INSEE

== See also ==
- Communes of the Isère department
