= Meylan =

- Commune
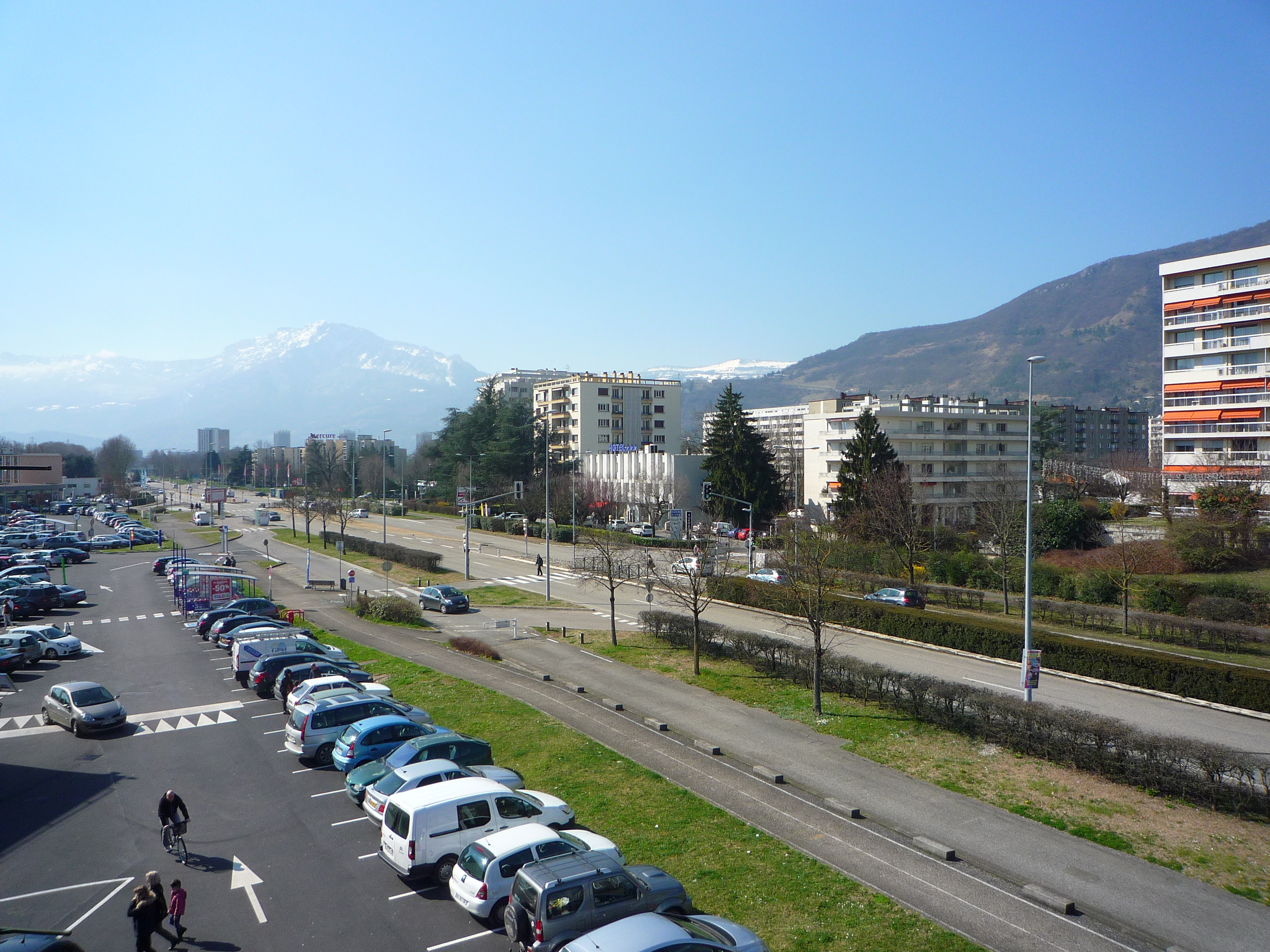
- The Avenue de Verdun, in Meylan

- Coat of arms
- Location of Meylan
- Location within France Location within Auvergne-Rhône-Alpes
- Coordinates: 45°12′33″N 5°46′48″E
- Country: France
- Region: Auvergne-Rhône-Alpes
- Department: Isère
- Arrondissement: Grenoble
- Canton: Meylan
- Intercommunality: Grenoble-Alpes Métropole

Government
  - Mayor (2020–2026): Philippe Cardin
- Area^{1}: 12.32 km^{2} (4.76 sq mi)
- Elevation: 350 m (1,150 ft)
- Highest elevation: 1,313 m (4,308 ft)
- Lowest elevation: 206 m (676 ft)
- Population (2023): 18,770
  - Density: 1,524/km^{2} (3,946/sq mi)
- Time zone: UTC+01:00 (CET)
  - Summer (DST): UTC+02:00 (CEST)
- INSEE/Postal code: 38229 /38240
- ^{1} French Land Register data, which excludes lakes, ponds, glaciers > 1 km^{2} (0.386 sq mi or 247 acres) and river estuaries.

Meylan (French pronunciation: [mɛlɑ̃]; Arpitan: Mèlan) is a commune in the Isère department in southeastern France. It is part of the Grenoble urban unit (agglomeration).

== Population ==
Historical population

Year	Pop.	±% p.a.
1793	937	—
1800	1,074	+1.97%
1806	978	−1.55%
1821	1,002	+0.16%
1831	1,117	+1.09%
1836	1,211	+1.63%
1841	1,179	−0.53%
1846	1,169	−0.17%
1851	1,097	−1.26%
1856	1,072	−0.46%
1861	1,049	−0.43%
1866	1,094	+0.84%
1872	1,118	+0.36%
1876	1,082	−0.81%
1881	1,015	−1.27%
1886	1,014	−0.02%
1891	905	−2.25%
1896	930	+0.55%
1901	874	−1.23%

Year	Pop.	±% p.a.
1906	879	+0.11%
1911	911	+0.72%
1921	934	+0.25%
1926	950	+0.34%
1931	1,021	+1.45%
1936	1,129	+2.03%
1946	1,236	+0.91%
1954	1,717	+4.19%
1962	3,113	+7.72%
1968	6,534	+13.15%
1975	12,122	+9.23%
1982	14,561	+2.65%
1990	17,863	+2.59%
1999	18,741	+0.53%
2007	17,200	−1.07%
2012	17,646	+0.51%
2017	17,129	−0.59%
2023	18,770	+1.54%

Source: EHESS and INSEE (1968-2023)

== Misuse of public money ==
In 2013, the newly reelected Mayor of Meylan Marie-Christine Tardy was brought to justice for unlawfully taking interest in an affair concerning her husband's remuneration.

In 2016, she received a suspended sentence of 18 months in jail and 5 years of ineligibility. Her husband also received a suspended sentence, of 12 months in jail. Both paid fines of over €20,000.

== Education ==
There are five groups of preschools (écoles maternelles) and elementary schools: Béalières, Buclos/Grand Pré, Haut-Meylan, Maupertuis, and Mi-Plaine. There are two junior high schools, Collège des Buclos and Collège Lionel Terray, and a senior high school, Lycée du Grésivaudan.

The École Compleméntaire de Grenoble (グルノーブル補習授業校 Gurunōburu Hoshū Jugyō Kō), a part-time Japanese supplementary school, is held in the École Élémentaire Mi-Plaine.

== Economy ==
Inovallée is a science park located at Meylan.

== Twin towns ==
- Didcot, United Kingdom, since 1985
- (United States) Gonzales, USA, since 1985
- Planegg, Germany, since 1985
