= Camille Galliard-Minier =

French politician and lawyer (born 1975)

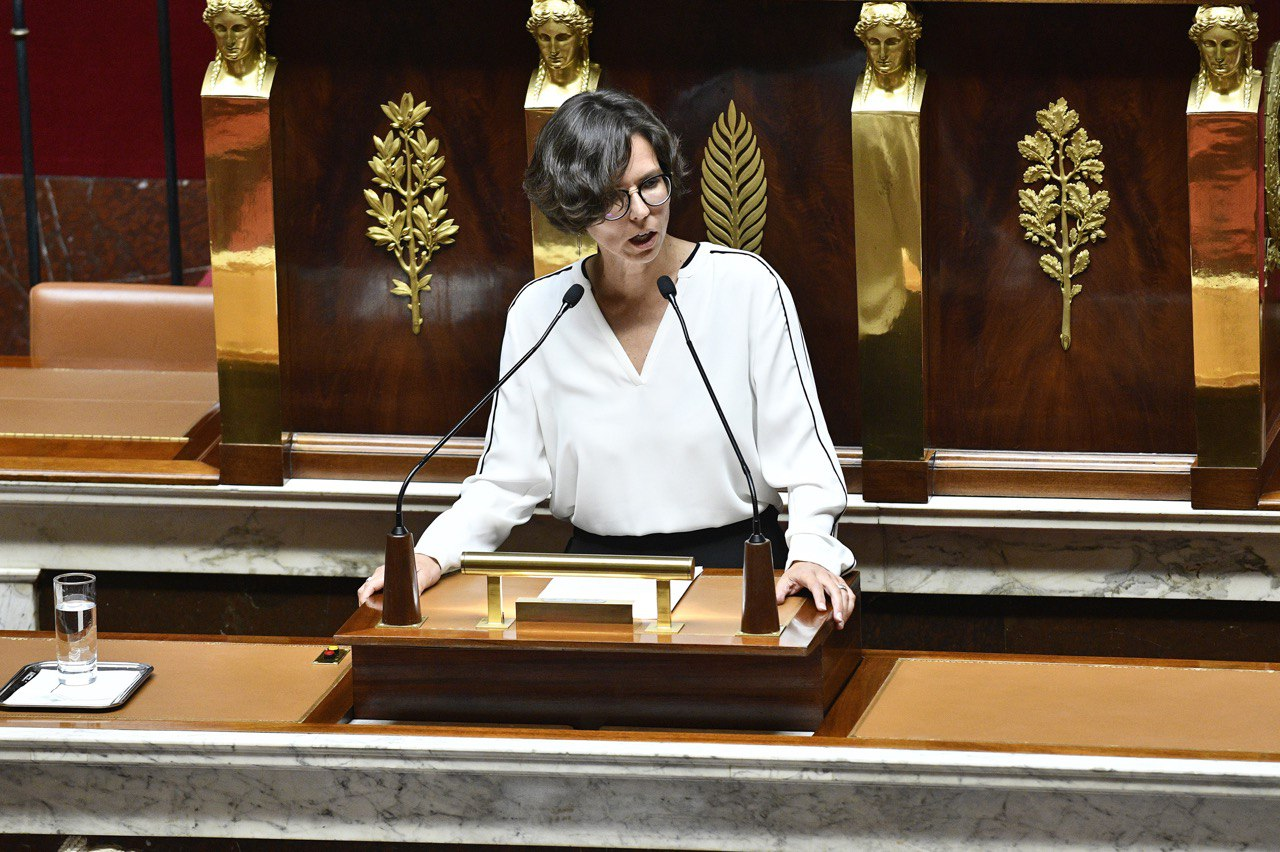
- Galliard-Minier in 2020

Deputy for Isère's 1st constituency in the National Assembly of France
- Incumbent
- Assumed office 20 January 2025
- Preceded by: Hugo Prevost
- In office 17 March 2020 – 21 June 2022
- Preceded by: Olivier Véran
- Succeeded by: Olivier Véran

Personal details
- Born: 26 May 1975 (age 50) La Tronche, Isère, France
- Party: Renaissance

Camille Galliard-Minier (née Galliard; born 26 May 1975) is a French politician and lawyer, the deputy for Isère's 1st constituency in the National Assembly of France from 2020 to 2022, and since 2025.

== Early life and education ==
Camille Galliard-Minier was born 26 May 1975 in La Tronche, Isère.

She grew up in a family committed to local politics: her mother was elected in the town of La Tronche, and her grandfather, Louis Gaillard, was mayor of this same municipality from 1971 to 1985.

In 2003, Camille Galliard-Minier defended a doctoral thesis in law under the supervision of Pierre Murat. She then became a lawyer registered with the Grenoble bar until 2017, notably in the early 2010s appearing for the family of the victim in the Manuela Gonzalez case, nicknamed the “black widow of Isère”.

== Political career ==
Defining herself a member of the centre-left, she is a member of La République En Marche! In the 2017 legislative elections, she was the substitute for Olivier Véran in Isère's 1st constituency. She became the deputy in March 2020, following Véran's appointment to the government. She did not contest the 2022 election.

She was elected again in 2025, and is in office since January 20, 2025.
