= Montbonnot-Saint-Martin =

- Commune
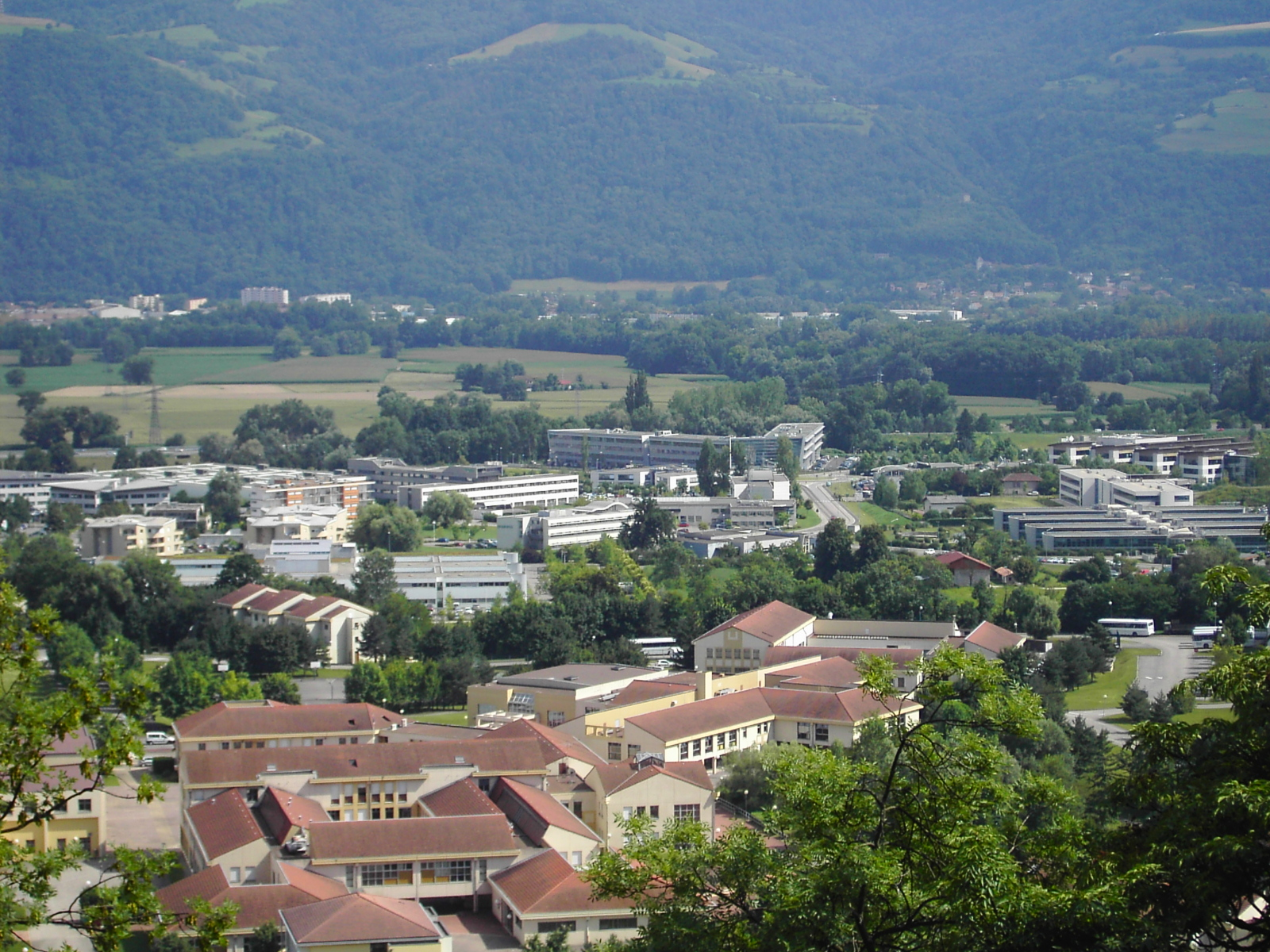
- A general view of Montbonnot

- Coat of arms
- Location of Montbonnot-Saint-Martin
- Location within France Location within Auvergne-Rhône-Alpes
- Coordinates: 45°13′40″N 5°48′12″E
- Country: France
- Region: Auvergne-Rhône-Alpes
- Department: Isère
- Arrondissement: Grenoble
- Canton: Meylan
- Intercommunality: CC Le Grésivaudan

Government
  - Mayor (2020–2026): Dominique Bonnet
- Area^{1}: 6.38 km^{2} (2.46 sq mi)
- Elevation: 300 m (980 ft)
- Highest elevation: 356 m (1,168 ft)
- Lowest elevation: 215 m (705 ft)
- Population (2023): 5,698
  - Density: 893/km^{2} (2,310/sq mi)
- Demonym: Bonimontains
- Time zone: UTC+01:00 (CET)
  - Summer (DST): UTC+02:00 (CEST)
- INSEE/Postal code: 38249 /38330
- ^{1} French Land Register data, which excludes lakes, ponds, glaciers > 1 km^{2} (0.386 sq mi or 247 acres) and river estuaries.

Montbonnot-Saint-Martin (French pronunciation: [mɔ̃bɔno sɛ̃ maʁtɛ̃]) is a commune in the Isère department in southeastern France. It is part of the Grenoble urban unit (agglomeration).

== Population ==
Historical population

Year	Pop.	±% p.a.
1793	212	—
1800	266	+3.29%
1806	282	+0.98%
1821	297	+0.35%
1831	360	+1.94%
1836	346	−0.79%
1841	325	−1.24%
1846	286	−2.52%
1851	714	+20.08%
1856	652	−1.80%
1861	695	+1.29%
1866	669	−0.76%
1872	703	+0.83%
1876	728	+0.88%
1881	670	−1.65%
1886	610	−1.86%
1891	608	−0.07%
1896	637	+0.94%
1901	580	−1.86%

Year	Pop.	±% p.a.
1906	559	−0.73%
1911	555	−0.14%
1921	493	−1.18%
1926	539	+1.80%
1931	557	+0.66%
1936	531	−0.95%
1946	600	+1.23%
1954	735	+2.57%
1962	782	+0.78%
1968	1,016	+4.46%
1975	1,735	+7.94%
1982	1,859	+0.99%
1990	2,808	+5.29%
1999	3,827	+3.50%
2007	4,478	+1.98%
2012	4,798	+1.39%
2017	5,134	+1.36%
2023	5,698	+1.75%

Source: EHESS and INSEE (1968-2023)

== Economy ==
Inovallée is a science park located at Montbonnot-Saint-Martin.

== See also ==
- Communes of the Isère department
