= Philippe Baptiste =

French engineer and researcher (born 1972)

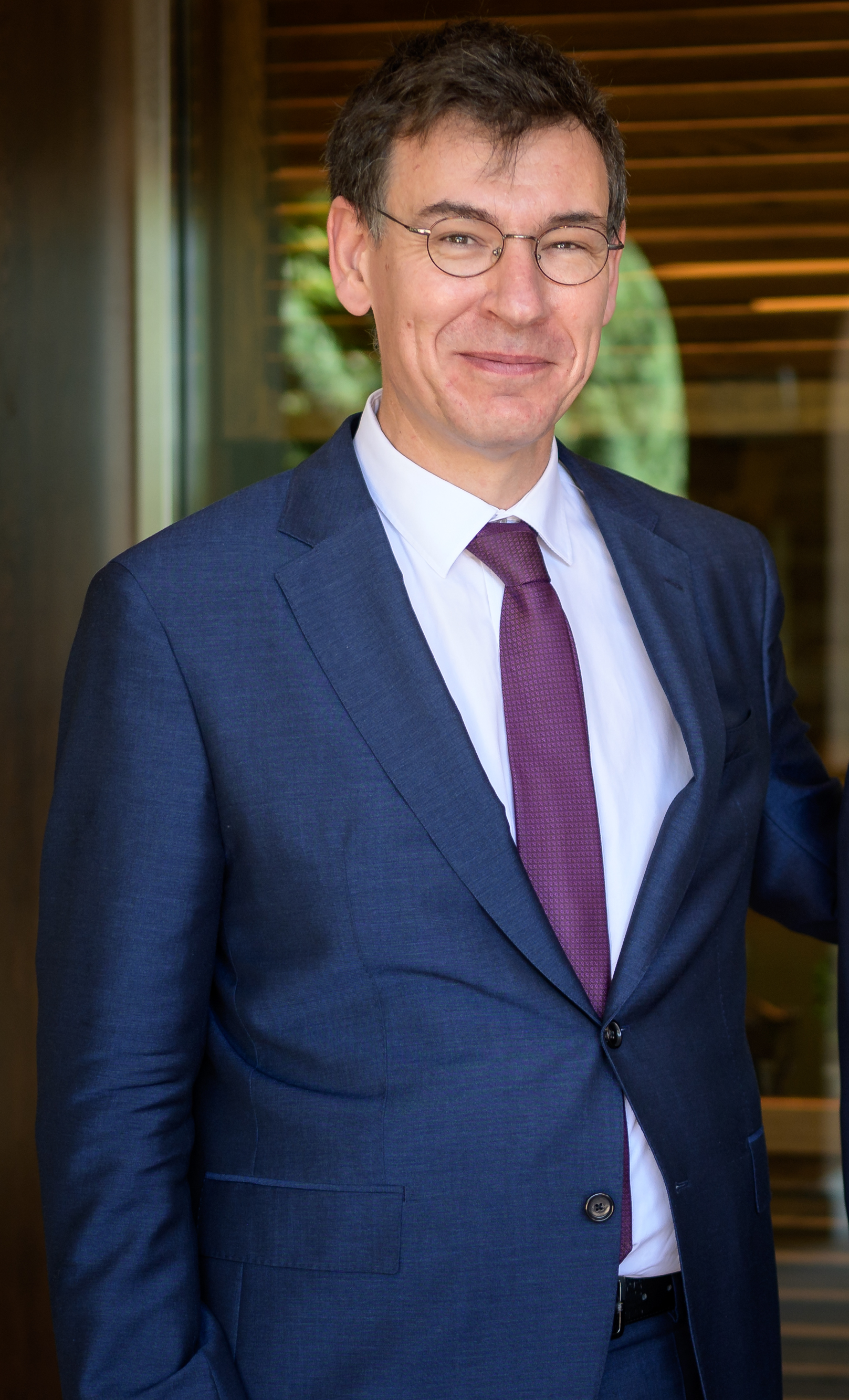

Minister of Higher Education, Research and Space
- Incumbent
- Assumed office 12 October 2025
- Prime Minister: Sébastien Lecornu
- Preceded by: Himself (as minister delegate)

Minister Delegate for Higher Education and Research
- In office 23 December 2024 – 12 October 2025
- Prime Minister: François Bayrou; Sébastien Lecornu
- Preceded by: Patrick Hetzel
- Succeeded by: Himself (as full minister)

12th President of the French Space Agency
- In office 14 April 2021 – 3 January 2025
- Preceded by: Jean-Yves Le Gall
- Succeeded by: Lionel Suchet (acting)

Personal details
- Born: 28 March 1972 (age 54)
- Occupations: Academician, Civil Engineer, Scientist
- Title: CEO of CNES

Academic background
- Education: University of Technology of Compiègne; University of Strathclyde; Sorbonne University; Ecole des Mines

Philippe Baptiste (French: [filip baptist]; born 28 March 1972) is a French engineer, academic and researcher who has been serving as Minister responsible for Higher Education and Research in the government of Prime Minister François Bayrou since 2024, reporting to Minister Elizabeth Borne.

Baptiste is most well known as the president of the National Centre for Space Studies (CNES) in addition to his several books and scientific publications and communications in the field of algorithms, combinatorial optimization, operational research and artificial intelligence.

== Early life and education ==
Baptiste was born on March 28, 1972, in France. Baptiste holds a PhD in computer science from the University of Technology of Compiègne additionally he is a civil engineering graduate from the Ecole des Mines engineering school in Nancy. He also holds a MSc from the University of Strathclyde, Glasgow and holds a DEA postgraduate diploma from Sorbonne University and is a research director. Baptiste specialises in operational research and artificial intelligence (AI), combinatorial optimisation, and algorithms.

== Career ==
In 1999 during his academic career, Baptiste was a researcher at the French National Centre for Scientific Research (CNRS), in addition to IBM's Watson Research Center during 2000 to 2001.

Furthermore, for more than ten years during 2001 to 2012 Baptiste was a lecturer at France's Ecole Polytechnique engineering school. During this time he published several books and around 150 scientific papers, and became the head of Ecole Polytechnique engineering school's information technology laboratory and is credited with creating the Institute of Information Sciences and Interactions prior to being appointed Associate Director General in 2014 of CNRS.

In 2016, Baptiste was appointed as Chief Scientific Officer and later in 2017 named Chief Technology Officer of oil, natural gas, and speciality chemicals company Total. Furthermore, Baptiste has aided in founding and developing a number of start-ups and followed several collaborations with digital, defence and aviation manufactures.

From 2017 to 2019, Baptiste served as chief of staff to Minister of Higher Education Frédérique Vidal. In 2019, he was an advisor to Prime Minister Édouard Philippe, During this time, he was in close connection with the space policy.

In 2020, Baptiste was appointed Partner and Director of the Paris office of the global management consulting firm Boston Consulting Group.

== Recognition ==
During 1999, Baptiste was awarded the Prix Robert Faure award by the French Operations Research & Decision Support Society (ROADEF), a non-profit society that aims to promote scientific fields of operations Research and Decision in France. The award is in tribute to Professor Robert Faure and available to younger researchers (under 36) who are members of ROADEF, and is awarded every 3 years.

In November 2000, Baptiste was awarded the ERCIM Cor Baayen Award for his PhD thesis in an ERCIM country which include: Cyprus, Poland, France, Germany, Austria, Greece, Italy, Norway, Portugal, The Netherlands, Finland and Sweden. Baptiste won this award due to the quality of his PhD thesis and his previous publications and achievements up to the year 2000.

== See also ==
- European Space Agency
- French space program
- Space technology
