= Patrick Hetzel =

French politician (born 1964)

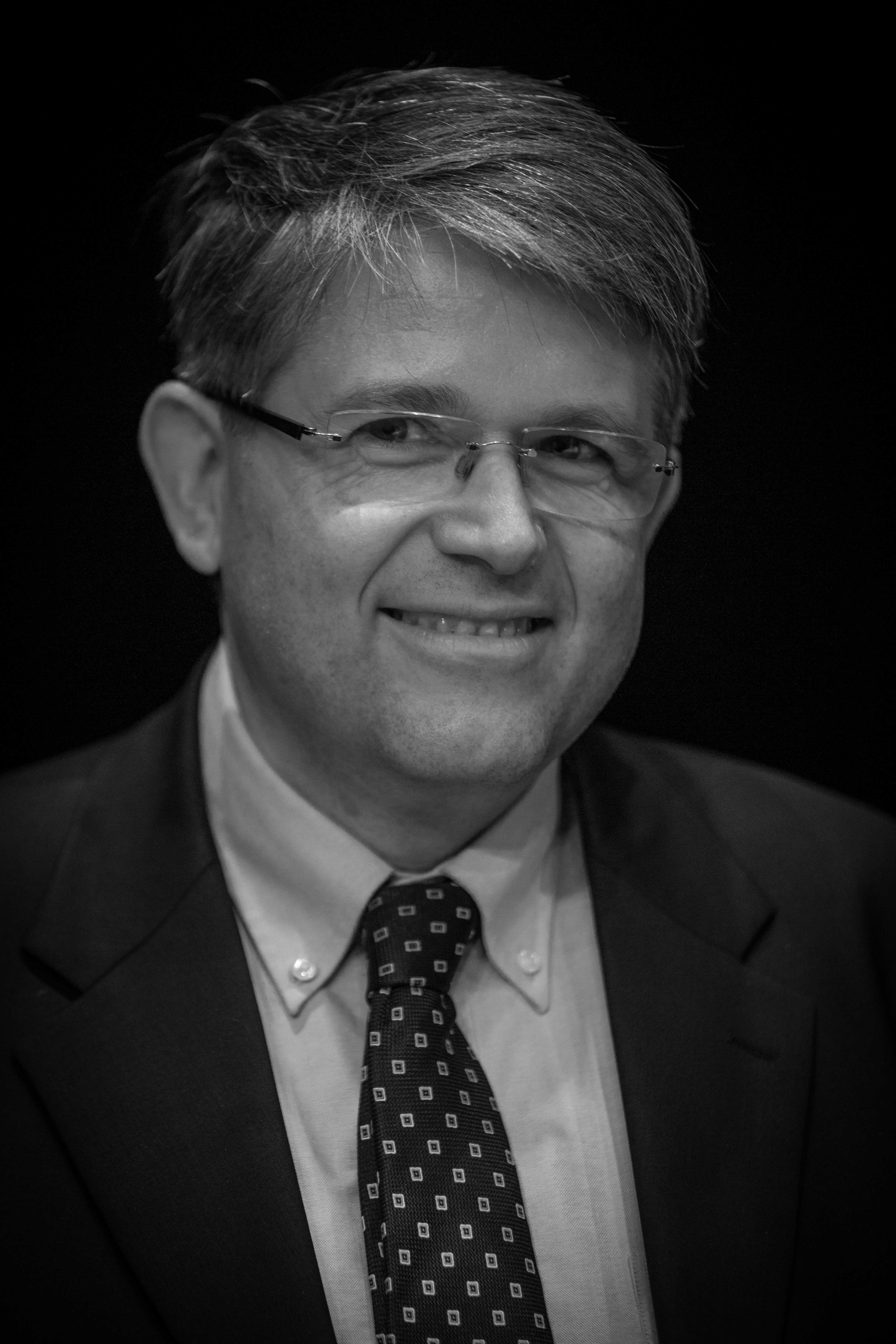
- Hetzel in 2014

Minister of Higher Education, Research and Innovation
- In office 21 September 2024 – 23 December 2024
- Prime Minister: Michel Barnier
- Preceded by: Sylvie Retailleau
- Succeeded by: Élisabeth Borne

Member of the National Assembly for Bas-Rhin's 7th constituency
- In office 20 June 2012 – 21 October 2024
- Preceded by: Émile Blessig
- Succeeded by: Éliane Kremer

Personal details
- Born: 2 July 1964 (age 62) Phalsbourg, Seine-Saint-Denis, Île-de-France, France
- Party: Republican
- Education: EM Strasbourg Business School

Patrick Hetzel (born 2 July 1964) is a French politician of the Republicans (LR) who has been a member of the National Assembly since 2012. He represents Bas-Rhin's 7th constituency.

== Political career ==
In parliament, Hetzel has served as member of the Finance Committee (since 2016) and the Committee on Cultural Affairs and Education (2012–2016). and the Parliamentary Office for the Evaluation of Scientific and Technological Choices (–2022). In addition to his committee assignments, he is a member of the French-German Parliamentary Friendship Group.

Ahead of the 2022 presidential elections, Hetzel publicly declared his support for Michel Barnier as the Republicans’ candidate. He was re-elected in the 2022 French legislative election.

Hetzel endorsed Christian Jacob as the party’s chairman in the run-up to the Republicans’ 2019 convention, and later supported Bruno Retailleau’s candidacy to succeed Jacob in 2022.

On 21 September 2024, Hetzel became Minister of Higher Education, Research and Innovation in the short-lived government of Michel Barnier, succeeding Sylvie Retailleau. On 23 December 2024, he was replaced by Élisabeth Borne in the government of François Bayrou.

== See also ==
- List of deputies of the 14th National Assembly of France
- List of deputies of the 15th National Assembly of France
- List of deputies of the 16th National Assembly of France
