= Canton of Meylan =

Canton of France

Coordinates: 45.21°N 5.78°E

The canton of Meylan is an administrative division of the Isère department, eastern France. Its borders were modified at the French canton reorganisation which came into effect in March 2015. Its seat is in Meylan.

It consists of the following communes:

1. Biviers
2. Corenc
3. Domène
4. Meylan
5. Montbonnot-Saint-Martin
6. Murianette
7. Le Sappey-en-Chartreuse
8. La Tronche
