= La Tronche =

- Commune
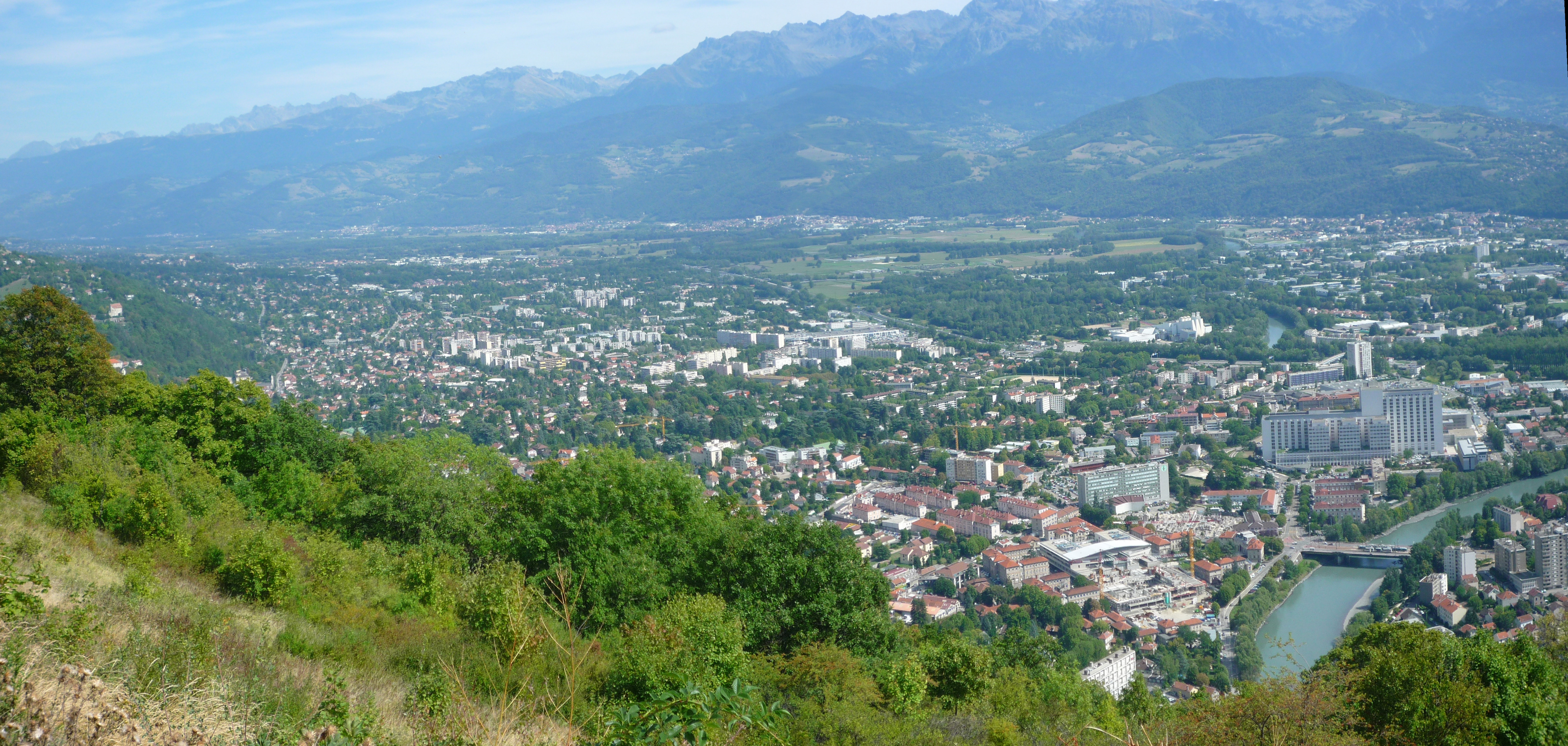
- A general view of La Tronche

- Coat of arms
- Location of La Tronche
- Location within France Location within Auvergne-Rhône-Alpes
- Coordinates: 45°12′26″N 5°44′28″E
- Country: France
- Region: Auvergne-Rhône-Alpes
- Department: Isère
- Arrondissement: Grenoble
- Canton: Meylan
- Intercommunality: Grenoble-Alpes Métropole

Government
  - Mayor (2020–2026): Bertrand Spindler
- Area^{1}: 6.4 km^{2} (2.5 sq mi)
- Elevation: 220 m (720 ft)
- Highest elevation: 1,045 m (3,428 ft)
- Lowest elevation: 207 m (679 ft)
- Population (2023): 6,424
  - Density: 1,000/km^{2} (2,600/sq mi)
- Time zone: UTC+01:00 (CET)
  - Summer (DST): UTC+02:00 (CEST)
- INSEE/Postal code: 38516 /38700
- ^{1} French Land Register data, which excludes lakes, ponds, glaciers > 1 km^{2} (0.386 sq mi or 247 acres) and river estuaries.

La Tronche (French pronunciation: [la tʁɔ̃ʃ]) is a commune in the Isère department, Southeastern France. It is part of the Grenoble urban unit (agglomeration).

The Centre Hospitalier Universitaire Grenoble Alpes is the main hospital of the French Alps.

The French archaeologist and hellenist Henri Metzger (1912–2007) was born in La Tronche. Also hailing from the town are the Members of Parliament Camille Galliard-Minier and Alexandre Portier, as well as Louis Bielle-Biarrey.

== Population ==
Historical population

Year	Pop.	±% p.a.
1793	997	—
1800	1,164	+2.24%
1806	1,095	−1.01%
1821	1,109	+0.08%
1831	1,372	+2.15%
1836	1,519	+2.06%
1841	1,537	+0.24%
1846	1,631	+1.19%
1851	1,722	+1.09%
1856	1,704	−0.21%
1861	1,728	+0.28%
1866	1,980	+2.76%
1872	2,131	+1.23%
1876	2,288	+1.79%
1881	2,385	+0.83%
1886	2,446	+0.51%
1891	2,428	−0.15%
1896	2,754	+2.55%
1901	2,887	+0.95%

Year	Pop.	±% p.a.
1906	2,857	−0.21%
1911	2,922	+0.45%
1921	3,461	+1.71%
1926	4,200	+3.95%
1931	5,572	+5.82%
1936	5,602	+0.11%
1946	5,364	−0.43%
1954	6,320	+2.07%
1962	7,517	+2.19%
1968	7,993	+1.03%
1975	7,410	−1.08%
1982	6,690	−1.45%
1990	6,454	−0.45%
1999	6,433	−0.04%
2007	6,079	−0.71%
2012	6,627	+1.74%
2017	6,596	−0.09%
2023	6,424	−0.44%

Source: EHESS and INSEE (1968-2023)

== See also ==
- Communes of the Isère department
