= Vedano al Lambro =

- Comune
- Comune di Vedano al Lambro
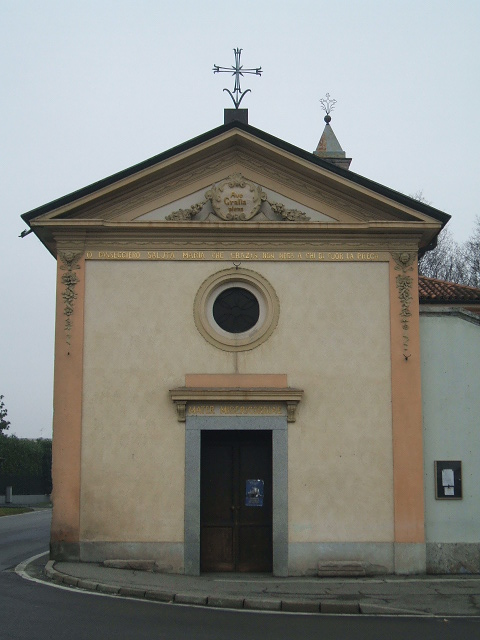
- The Sanctuary of Madonna della Misericordia, in Vedano

- Coat of arms

- Location within Italy Location within Lombardy
- Coordinates: 45°36′N 9°16′E
- Country: Italy
- Region: Lombardy
- Province: Monza and Brianza (MB)

Government
  - Mayor: Renato Meregalli (2011) (List of municipality called "per Vedano", centre-left)

Area
  - Total: 2.0 km^{2} (0.77 sq mi)
- Elevation: 187 m (614 ft)

Population (Dec. 2004)
  - Total: 7,688
  - Density: 3,800/km^{2} (10,000/sq mi)
- Demonym: Vedanesi
- Time zone: UTC+1 (CET)
  - Summer (DST): UTC+2 (CEST)
- Postal code: 20854
- Dialing code: 039
- Website: Official website

Vedano al Lambro is a comune (municipality) in the Province of Monza and Brianza in the Italian region Lombardy, located about 15 kilometres (9 mi) northeast of Milan.

Vedano al Lambro is popular because it is a border municipality of the motor-car racing track, where every year on September takes place the competition well known as Formula One's Grand Prix of Monza.

== Sport ==
Founded in 1966, Gs Vedano (Vedano Sports Group) is the city's team, and plays in the Seconda Categoria, Group S of Province of Monza and Brianza

== Twin towns ==
Vedano al Lambro is twinned with:

- Domène, France
