= Sylvie Retailleau =

French politician

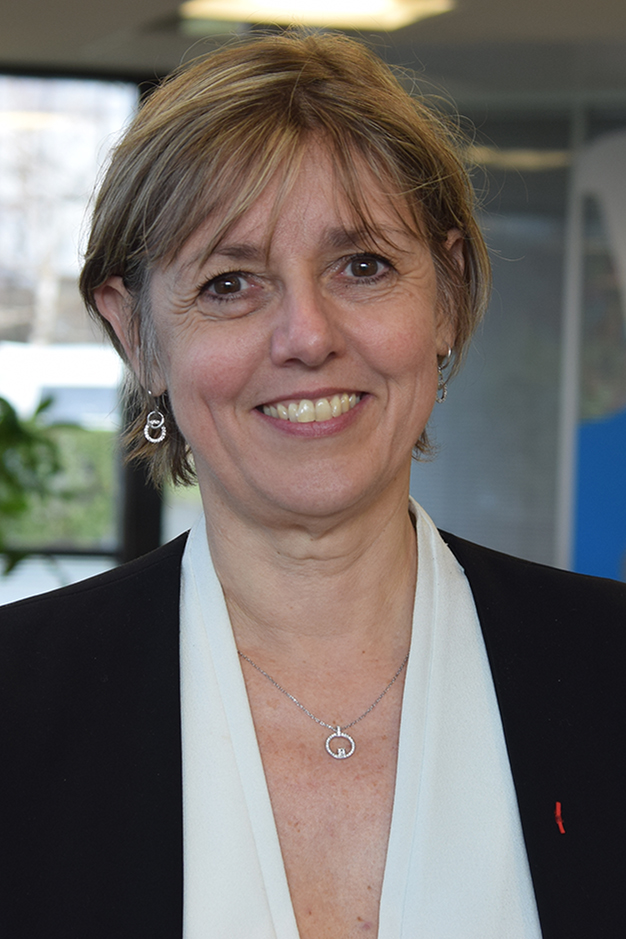
- Retailleau in 2018

Minister of Higher Education and Research
- In office 20 May 2022 – 21 September 2024
- Prime Minister: Élisabeth Borne; Gabriel Attal
- Preceded by: Frédérique Vidal
- Succeeded by: Patrick Hetzel

President of the Paris-Saclay University
- In office 2 March 2020 – 20 May 2022
- Preceded by: Françoise Moulin Civil
- Succeeded by: Estelle Iacona

Personal details
- Born: Sylvie Galdin; 24 February 1965 (age 61) Nice, France
- Party: Independent
- Education: École Normale Supérieure de Cachan; Paris-Sud 11 University
- Profession: Physicist
- Scientific career
- Thesis: Etude du transistor bipolaire npn a double heterojonction si/sige/si par simulations monte-carlo (1992)
- Doctoral advisor: René Castagné

Sylvie Retailleau, née Galdin (French: [silvi ʁətajo]; born 24 February 1965), is a French physicist and politician who has been serving as Minister of Higher Education in the government of successive Prime Ministers Élisabeth Borne and Gabriel Attal since 20 May 2022. She served as president of Paris-Sud University from 2016 to 2022.

== Early life and education ==
Retailleau was born on 24 February 1965 in Nice, as Sylvie Valérie Galdin.

== Career ==
On 1 December 2022, Retailleau was among the guests invited to the state dinner hosted by U.S. President Joe Biden in honor of President Emmanuel Macron at the White House.

In October 2023, Retailleau participated in the first joint cabinet retreat of the German and French governments in Hamburg, chaired by Chancellor Olaf Scholz and Macron.

In December 2023, Retailleau considered to resign from government after the latter had proposed controversial new legislation on France's immigration rules, but her request was refused by President Macron.

She is of no relation to fellow French politician Bruno Retailleau.
