= Alain Carignon =

French politician

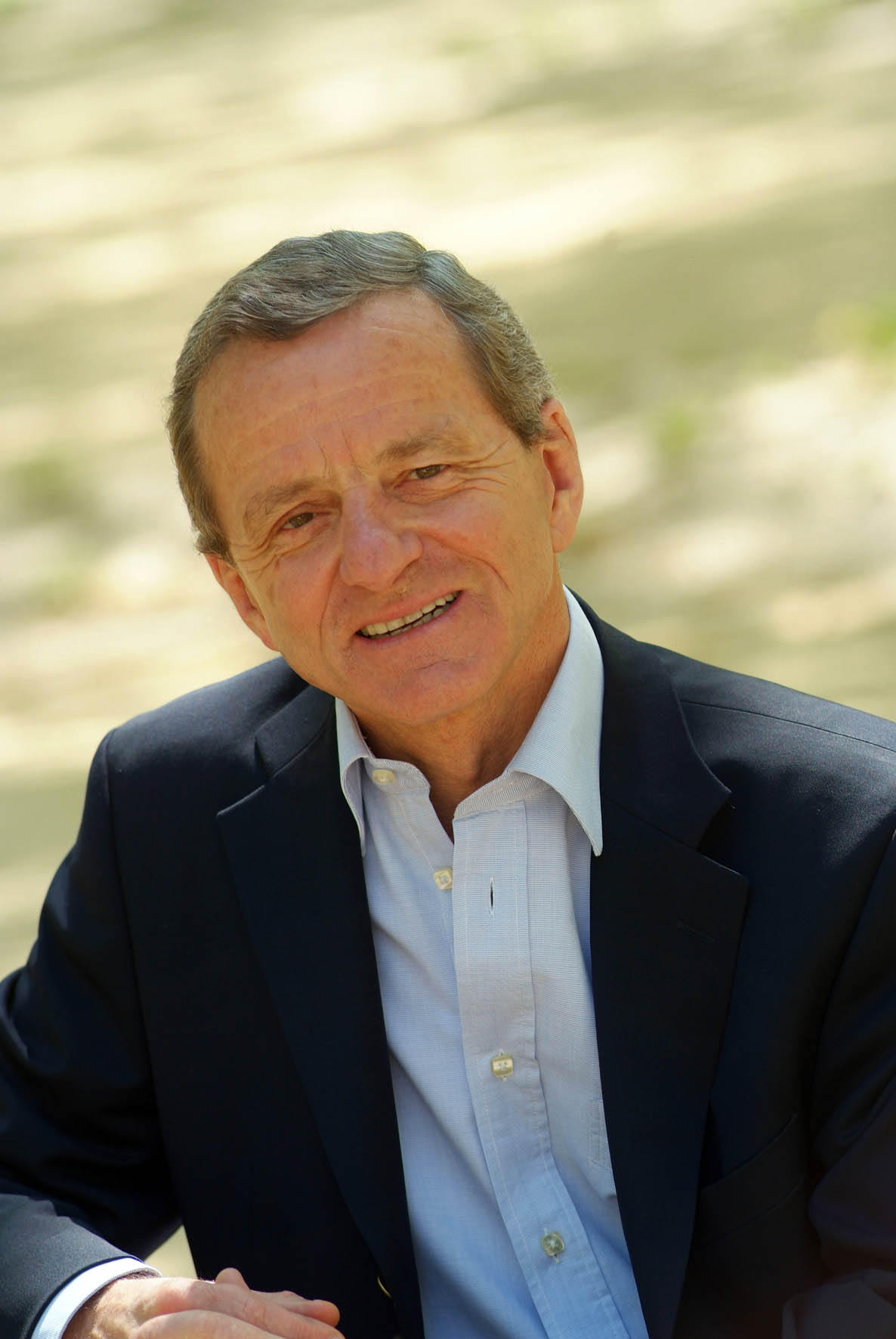
- A conservative French politician

Mayor of Grenoble
- In office 1983–1995
- Preceded by: Hubert Dudebout
- Succeeded by: Michel Destot

Personal details
- Born: 23 February 1949 (age 77) Vizille, France
- Party: The Republicans (France)

Alain Carignon (French pronunciation: [alɛ̃ kaʁiɲɔ̃]; born 23 February 1949 in Vizille (Isère)) is a conservative French politician. From 1986 to 1995, he was deputy to the National Assembly, before becoming a junior minister in charge of environmental issues in the second Chirac government; in 1986 he proposed legislation against major radioactive risks. He then became minister in charge of media and telecommunication in the Balladur government., but had to resign from that position when his indictment for corruption became inevitable. He was later sentenced to a 4 years jail term, and made unelectable for a further 5 years. He served 29 months of his jail sentence, the longest to date for a French politician convicted of corruption.

He returned to political activity in 2002 at the end of his unelectability term, and has since unsuccessfully run for several elected positions.
