= Adrien Zeller =

French politician (1940–2009)

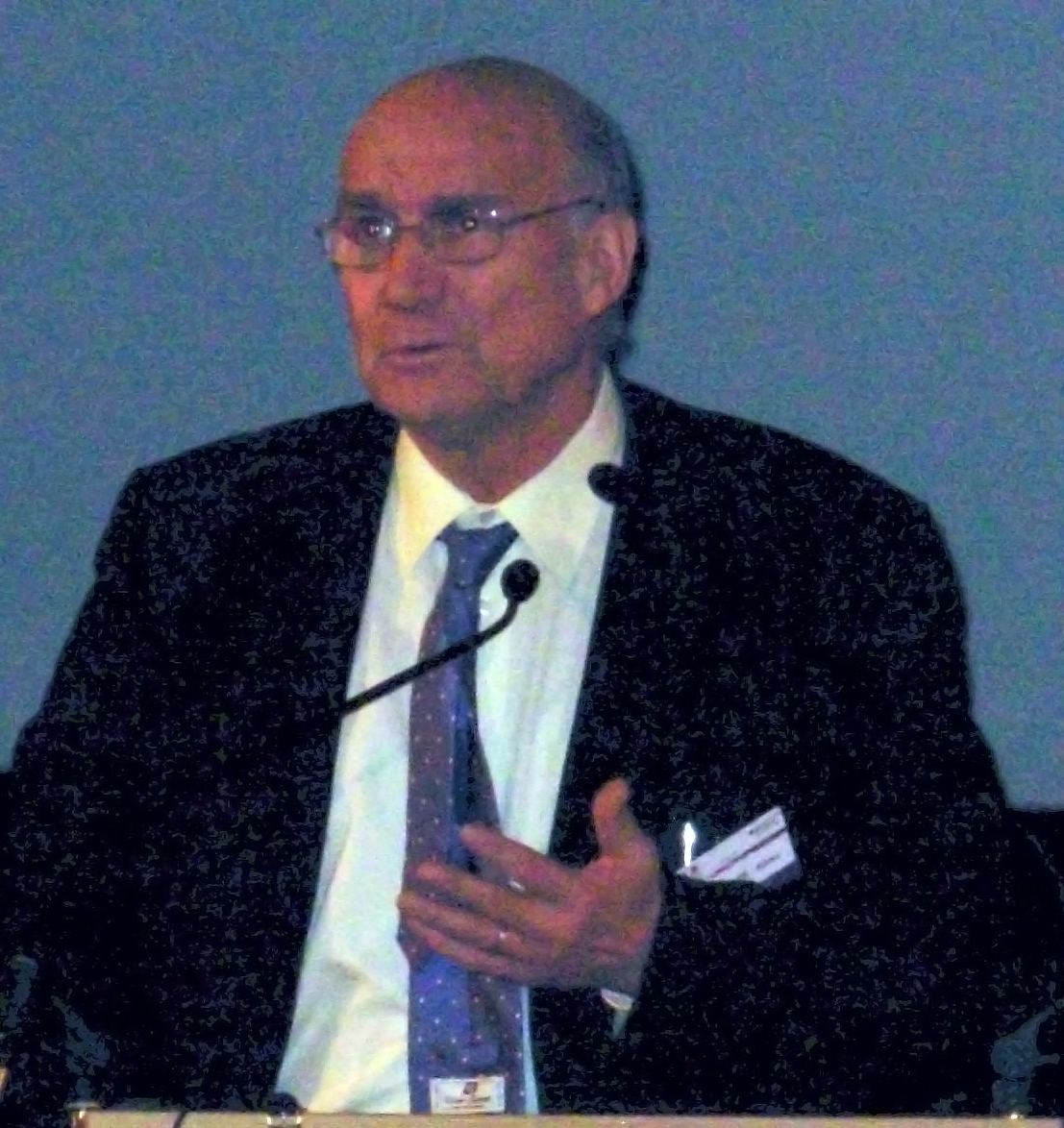
- Adrien Zeller in 2006

President of the Regional Council of Alsace
- In office 23 March 1996 – 22 August 2009
- Preceded by: Marcel Rudloff
- Succeeded by: André Reichardt

Secretary of State for Social Security
- In office 20 March 1986 – 10 May 1988
- President: François Mitterrand
- Prime Minister: Jacques Chirac
- Preceded by: Edmond Hervé
- Succeeded by: Claude Évin

Personal details
- Born: 2 April 1940 Saverne, France
- Died: 22 August 2009 (aged 69) Haguenau, France
- Party: UDF
- Education: College of Europe
- Profession: Civil servant

Adrien Zeller (2 April 1940 – 22 August 2009) was State Secretary of the Social Security in the second Jacques Chirac government from 1986 to 1988. He was the president of the regional council of Alsace from 1996 until 2009. He was a member of the Union for a Popular Movement. He was born in Saverne, and died aged 69 of a heart attack in Haguenau.

He was a graduate of the College of Europe in Bruges (promotion of 1965–1966).
