= Grenoble Alpes University =

Research university in France

Coordinates: 45°11′22″N 5°46′12″E

Université Grenoble Alpes
- Former names: University of Grenoble (1339–1970), UPMF & UJF & Stendhal (1971–2015)
- Motto: Veritas Liberabit
- Motto in English: The truth shall set you free
- Type: Public
- Established: 1339; 687 years ago
- Founder: Humbert II of Viennois
- Affiliations: Aurora, EUA, AUF, SGroup
- Budget: €450 million
- President: Yassine Lakhnech
- Academic staff: 6,050
- Administrative staff: 4,450
- Students: 57,000 (2026)
- Location: Cities of Grenoble, Saint-Martin-d'Hères and Gières, France
- Campus: Urban / college town 432 acres (175 ha)
- Website: www.univ-grenoble-alpes.fr

The Université Grenoble Alpes (French pronunciation: [ynivɛʁsite ɡʁənɔbl alp], Grenoble Alps University, abbr. UGA) is a grand établissement in Grenoble, France. Founded in 1339, it is the third largest university in France with about 60,000 students and over 3,000 researchers.

Established as the University of Grenoble by Humbert II of Viennois, it split in 1970 following the widespread civil unrest of May 1968. Three of the University of Grenoble's successors—Joseph Fourier University, Pierre Mendès-France University, and Stendhal University—merged in 2016 to restore the original institution under the name Université Grenoble Alpes. In 2020, the Grenoble Institute of Technology, the Grenoble Institute of Political Studies, and the Grenoble School of Architecture also merged with the original university.

The university is organized around two closely located urban campuses: Domaine Universitaire, which straddles Saint-Martin-d'Hères and Gières, and Campus GIANT in Grenoble. UGA also owns and operates facilities in Valence, Chambéry, Les Houches, Villar-d'Arêne, Mirabel, Échirolles, and La Tronche.

The city of Grenoble is one of the largest scientific centers in Europe, hosting facilities of every existing public research institution in France. This enables UGA to have hundreds of research and teaching partnerships, including close collaboration with the French National Centre for Scientific Research (CNRS) and the French Alternative Energies and Atomic Energy Commission (CEA). After Paris, Grenoble as a city is the largest research center in France with 22,800 researchers. In April 2019, UGA was selected to host one of the four French institutes in artificial intelligence.

== History ==
=== Early history (1339–1800) ===
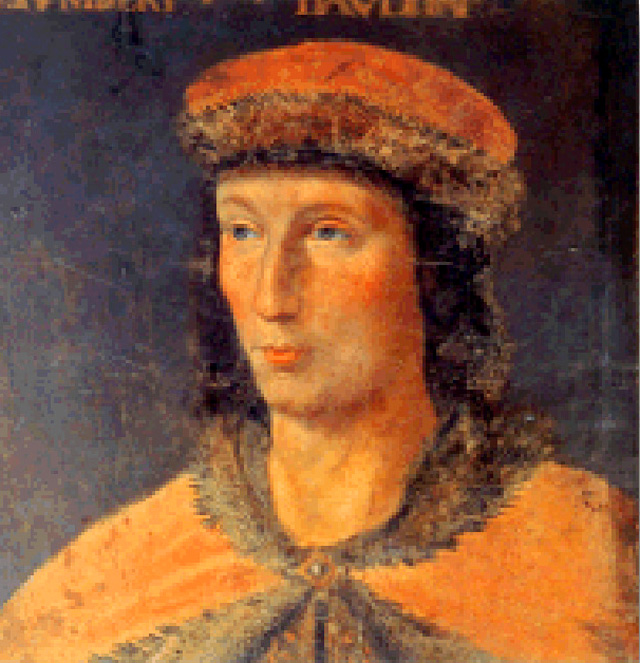
Founder Humbert II of Viennois

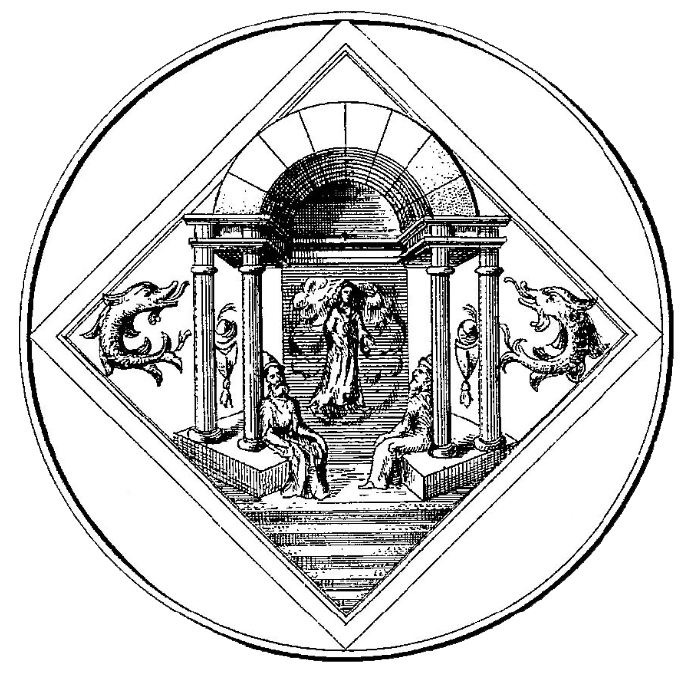
First official seal

The University of Grenoble was founded on 12 May 1339 by Humbert II of Viennois, the last independent ruler of Dauphiné, a state of the Holy Roman Empire. Its purpose was to teach civil and canon law, medicine, and the liberal arts. It was considered a leader in the Renaissance revival of the classics and development of liberal arts.

Humbert's actions were inspired by his granduncle Robert, King of Naples, at whose royal court Humbert spent his youth. King Robert, known as the Wise, skillfully developed Naples from a small port into a lavish city and had a reputation of a cultured man and a generous patron of the arts, friends with such great minds as Petrarch, Boccaccio, and Giotto.

Such experience contributed to Humbert's intention to create a university in his own state, and to do so he visited Pope Benedict XII to get a papal bull of approval.

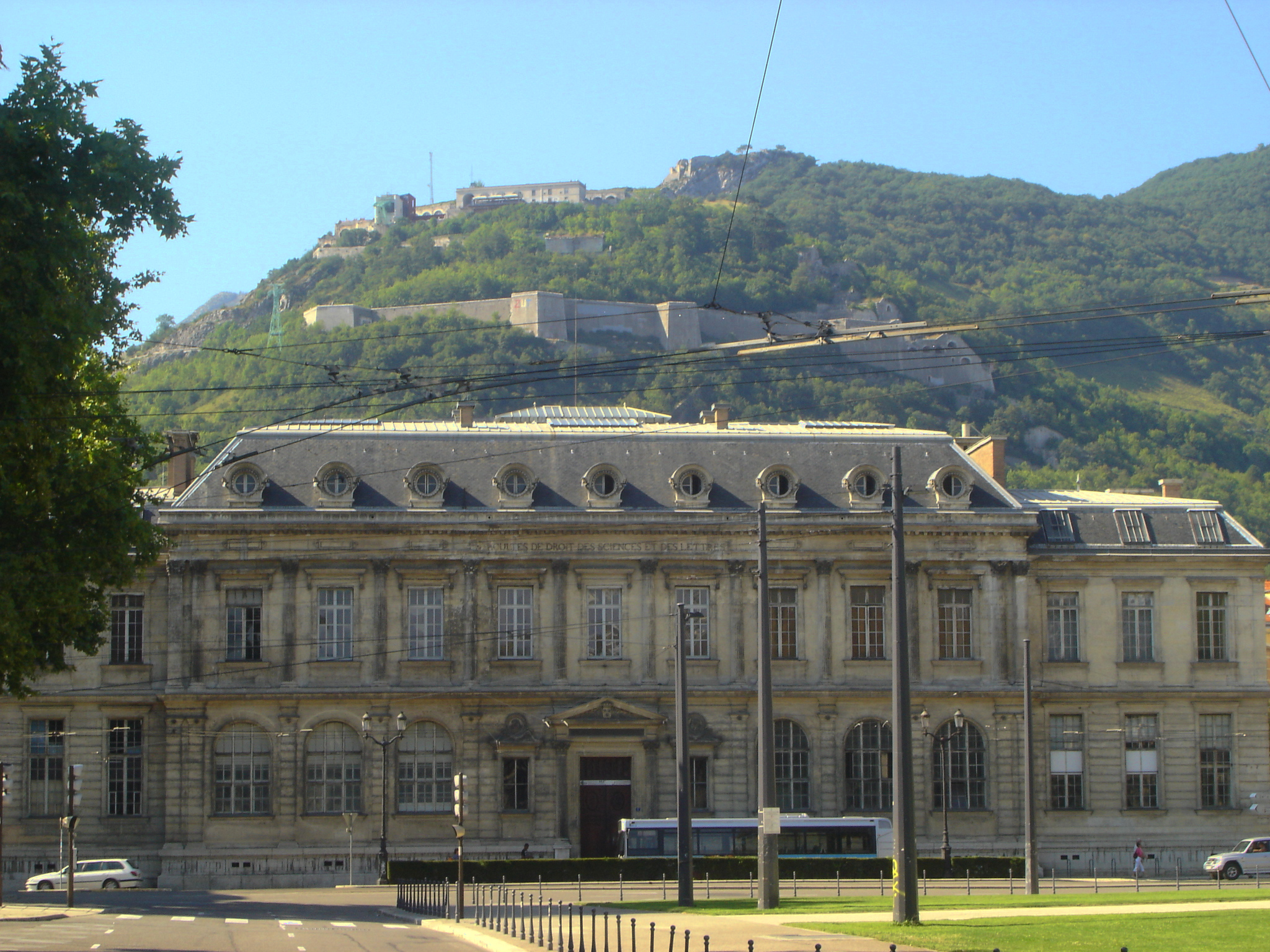
University Palace, now IUT Grenoble 1

Humbert cared deeply about his students, offering generous aid, protection, and even providing a hundred of them with free housing. Humbert's financial losses during the Smyrniote crusades, Black Death, and Dauphiné's attachment to France greatly decreased the activity of the university leading to its closure, since a small mountainous town could not support its activity on its own.

It was reopened again by Louis XI of France in 1475 in Valence under the name University of Valence, while the original university was restored in Grenoble in 1542 by Francis de Bourbon, Count of St. Pol. The two universities were reunited in 1565. At that point Grenoble was an important center of law practice in France, thus law practice was at the center of the university education.

The French Revolution, with its focus on the end to inherited privilege, led to the suppression of universities in France. To revolutionaries, universities embodied bastions of corporatism and established interests. Moreover, lands owned by the universities represented a source of wealth and therefore were confiscated, just as property possessed by the Church.

=== Modern period (1800–1968) ===
Changing university logos

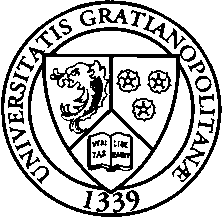
Université de Grenoble (1339-1970)

Université Grenoble Alpes (since 2020)

In 1805–1808, Napoleon reestablished faculties of law, letters, and science. The Bourbon Restoration had temporarily suppressed the Faculty of Letters and the Faculty of Law, but by the 1850s the university's activity had begun rapidly developing again.

The development of the sciences at the university was spearheaded by the transformation of Grenoble from a regional center to a major supplier of industrial motors and electrical equipment in 1880s. The faculties were formally inaugurated as the University of Grenoble in 1879 in the newly constructed Place de Verdun. There were around 3,000 students in 1930. Significant enrollment growth in the 1960s created pressures on the academic infrastructure of the university; the Suzanne Dobelmann library helped expand facilities, especially those relating to science and medicine.

=== Recent history (1968–present) ===
In the aftermath of the May 1968 events in France and the Faure law, many French universities were subdivided by both area of study and political ideology between 1968 and 1971. (Note: See History of universities in France) As part of this trend, the University of Grenoble was separated into four specialized institutions:

- Grenoble 1: Université scientifique et médicale de Grenoble [University of Science and Medicine of Grenoble], known as Université scientifique, technologique et médicale de Grenoble after 1980, and Joseph Fourier University after 1987
- Grenoble 2: Université des sciences sociales de Grenoble [University of Social Sciences of Grenoble], renamed Université Pierre Mendès France around 1990.
- Grenoble 3: Université des langues et lettres de Grenoble [University of Languages and Letters of Grenoble] renamed Stendhal University about 1987
- Institut national polytechnique de Grenoble, later Institut polytechnique de Grenoble [Grenoble Institute of Technology] or Grenoble INP.

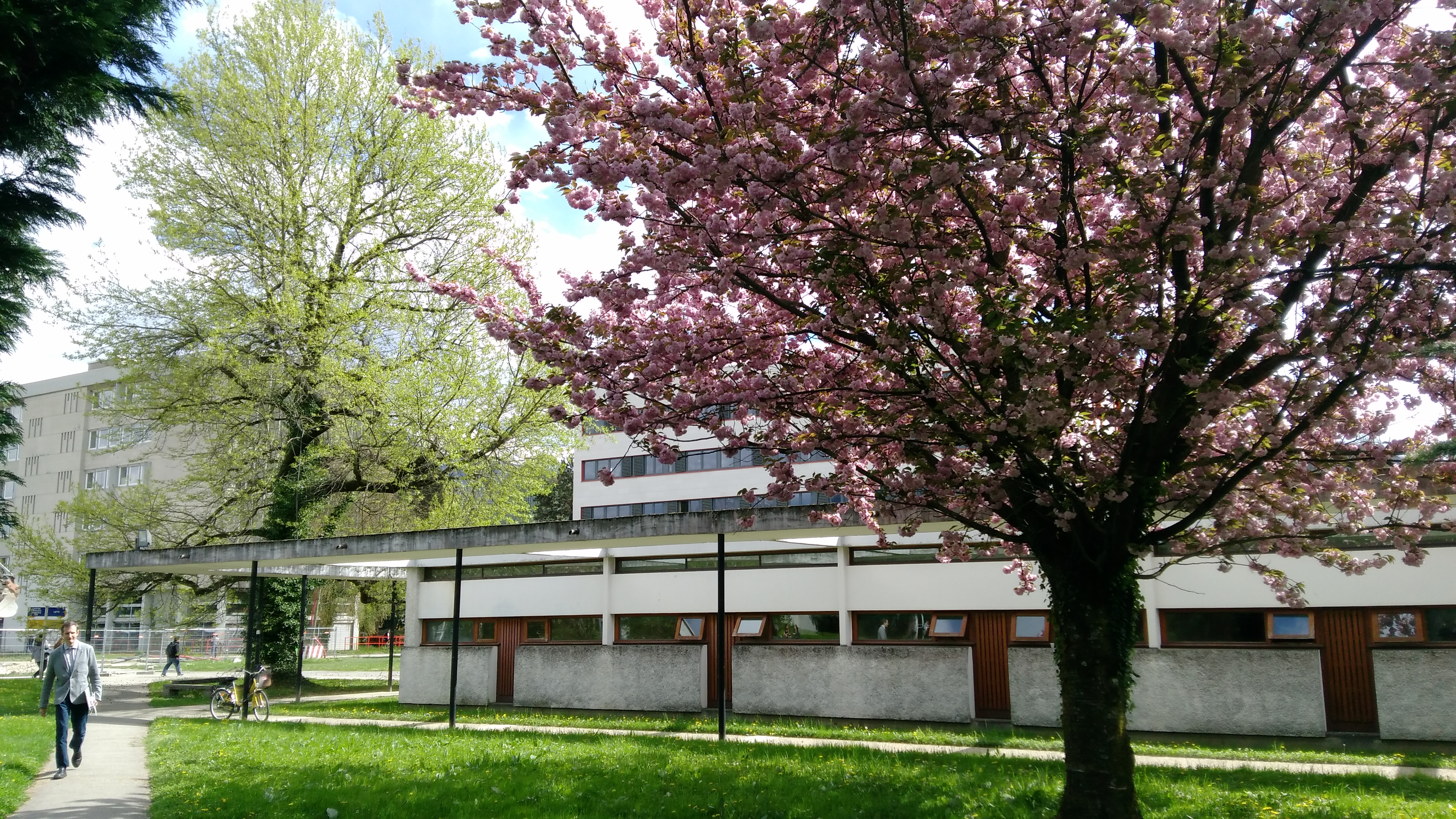
Part of the ex-UPMF facilities

Starting 2013, a movement began towards reunification of universities in Grenoble. Joseph Fourier University, Pierre Mendès-France University, and Stendhal University merged on 1 January 2016 under the name of the Université Grenoble Alpes.

On 1 January 2020, the Grenoble Institute of Technology (Grenoble-INP), the Grenoble Institute of Political Studies, the ENSAG School of Architecture, and the Community Université Grenoble Alpes merged with the University Grenoble Alpes.

In November 2023, the French Parliament granted the university the status of grand établissement.

== Campus ==
UGA facilities are mainly located in the Grenoble Agglomeration, centered around the Domaine Universitaire campus, GIANT campus, and La Tronche medical campus. However, there are many facilities that are located in other places in and outside of Grenoble, including the Valence campus and a number of smaller laboratories and research centres.

=== Domaine Universitaire (Grenoble) ===
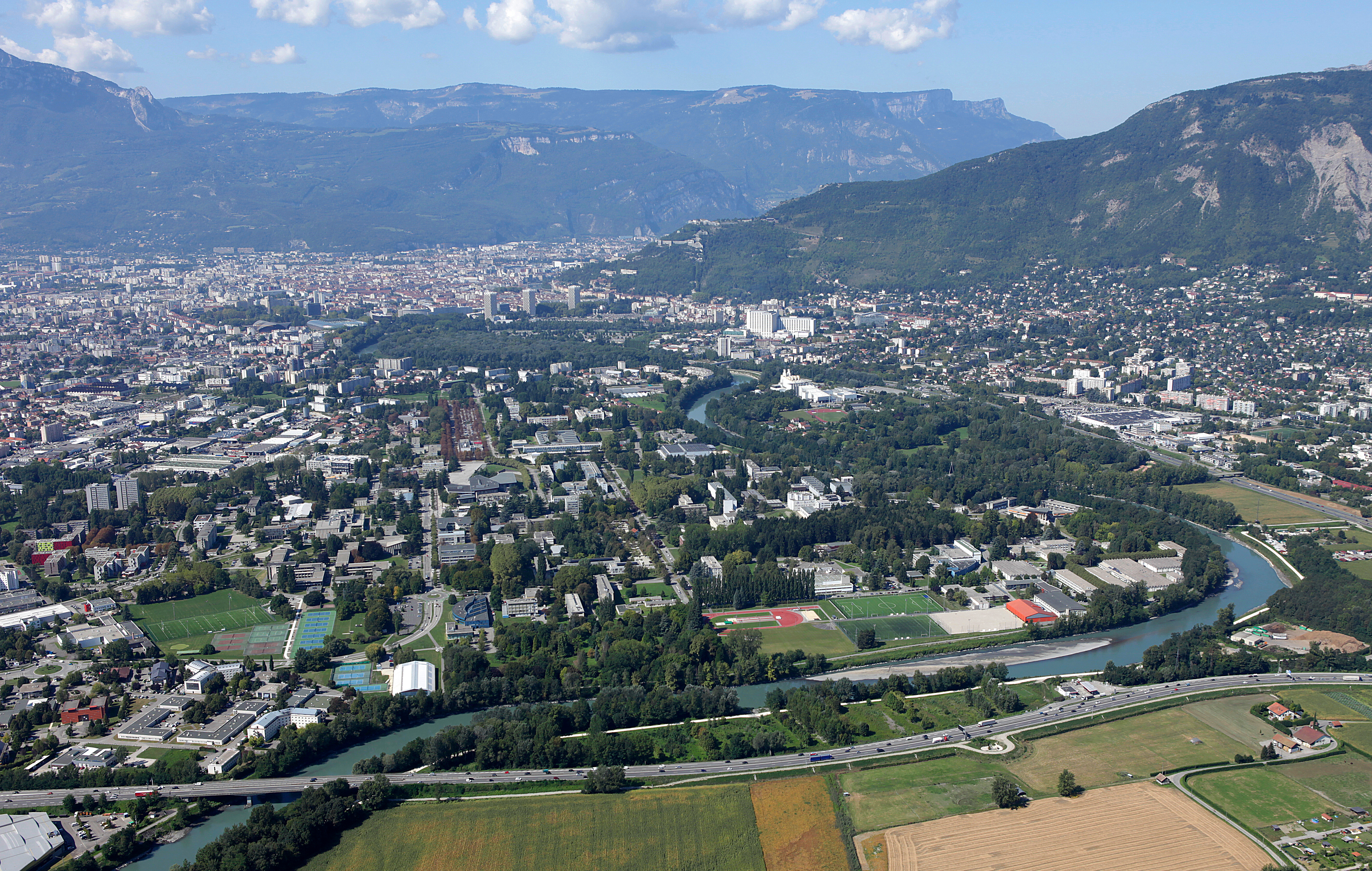
Domaine Universitaire

The Domaine Universitaire, also known as the University Campus and Campus de Saint-Martin-d'Hères, is the main UGA campus covering an area of 175 hectares. It is an autonomous part of the Grenoble-Alpes Métropole agglomeration and a part of Saint-Martin-d'Hères commune. The Domaine Universitaire hosts the majority of educational facilities and a significant portion of research laboratories of the university. Olivier-Clément Cacoub designed the science library, the administrative building of the science faculty and the large Louis-Weil amphitheater.

The Domaine Universitaire campus has a distinct feature of being an isolated part of the agglomeration dedicated solely to academics and student activities. This is an exemption from the typical model of French universities where university facilities are scattered throughout the city. Such organization was an experimental model applied in 1960s to accommodate the rapidly growing university. Over the years, due to such a distinct form of organization it earned the reputation of an "American campus". Another French university that follows this model is Paris-Saclay University although it is located 20 km away from Paris and not in a direct proximity to the city.

The campus includes 3,000 trees, including Arboretum Robert Ruffier-Lanche with over 250 different species of trees and shrubs from around the world. Due to its favourable vegetation, surrounded by Isère (river), in proximity of three mountain chains, and in immediate adjacency to the city, the campus is known for student quality of life. The university is ranked among the most beautiful universities and campuses in France and Europe. The campus has a network of public transport, including the Grenoble tramway, several bus lines, easy access the main highway and a network of bike lines. Grenoble is traditionally recognized as one of the best student cities in France.

La Tronche campus is located one tramway stop away from the Domaine Universitaire campus. It is primarily specialized in medical studies and is home to the Grenoble Alpes University Hospital.

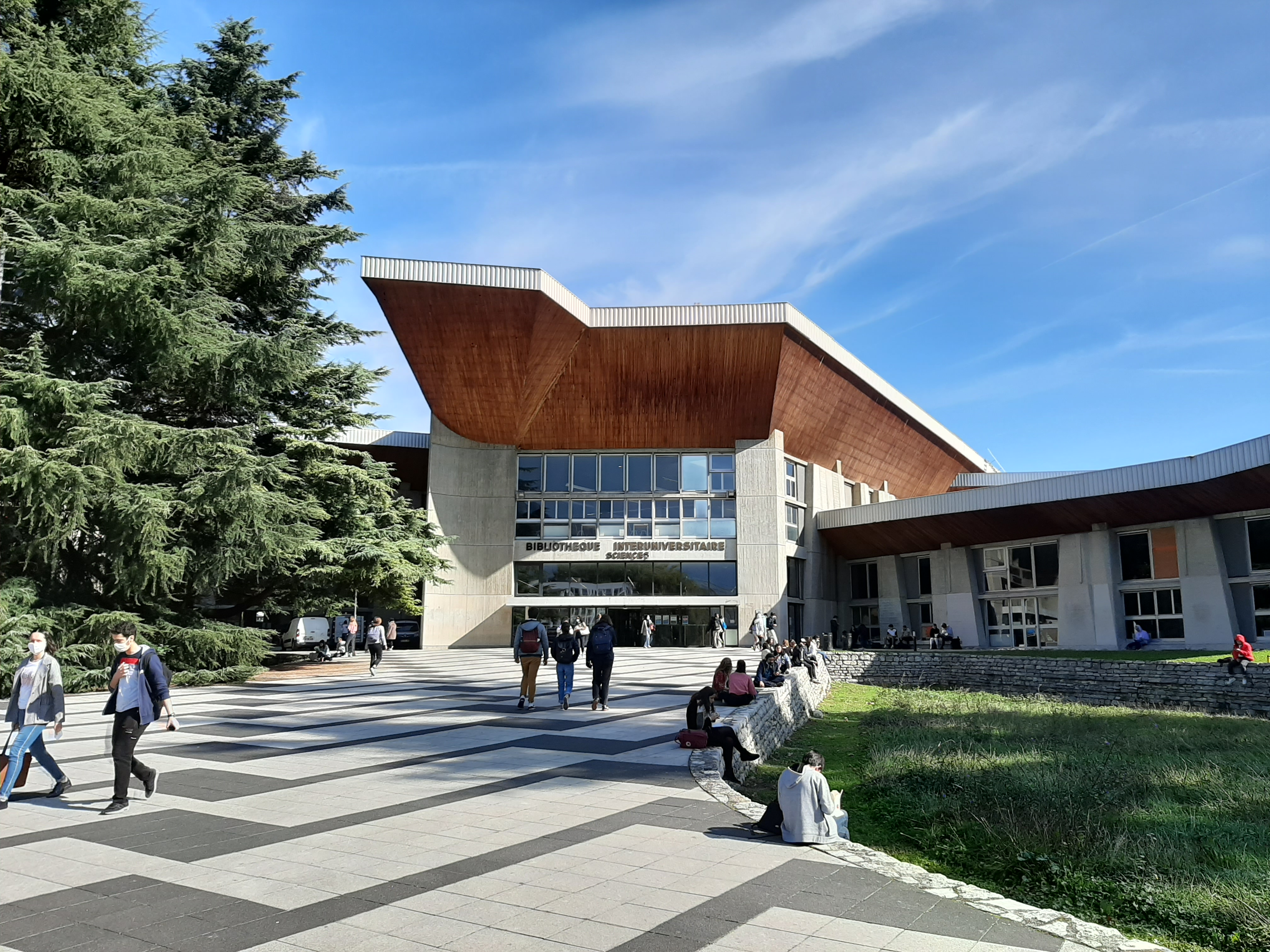
Joseph Fourier Library

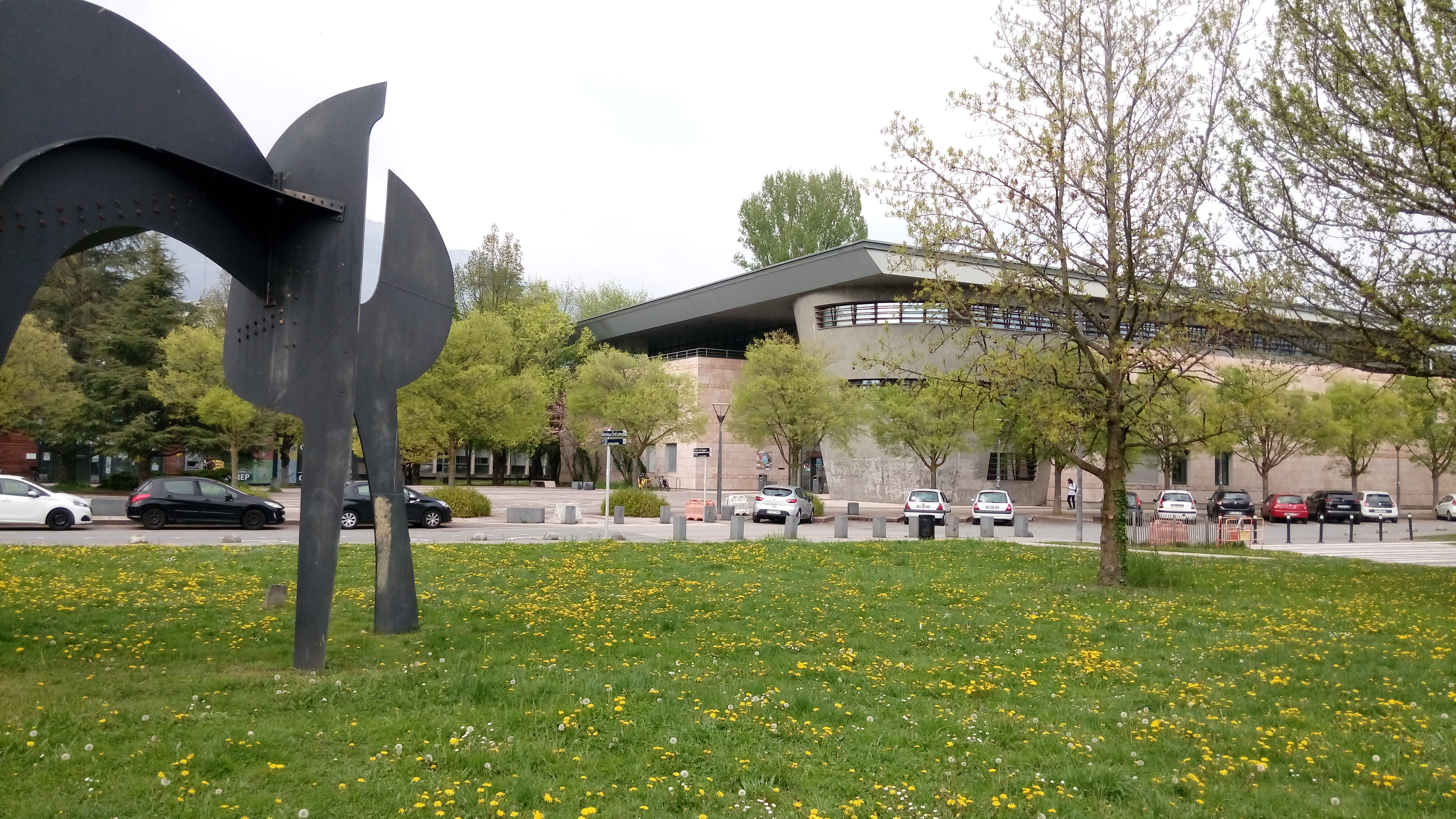
Maison des Langues

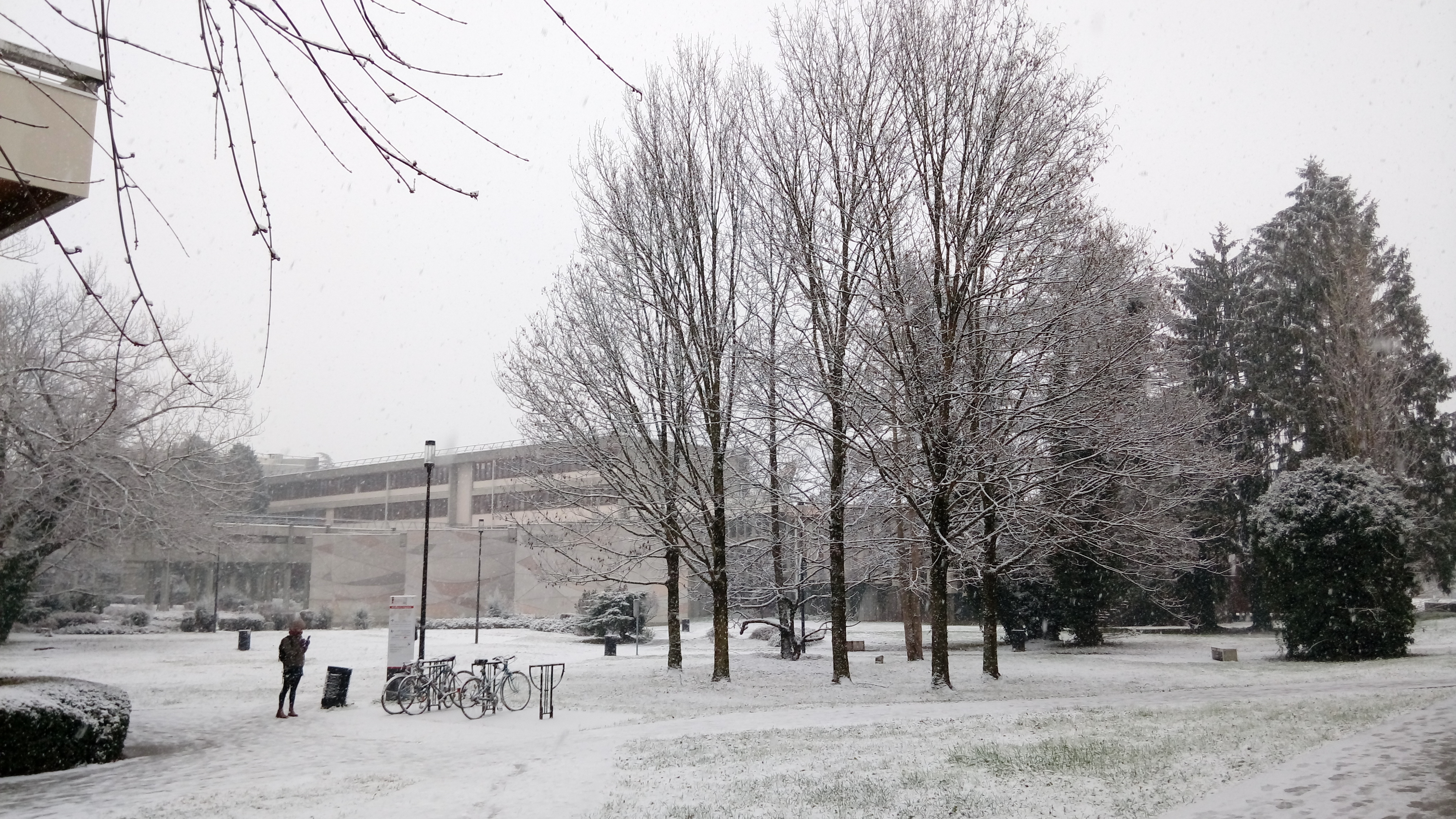
Stendhal Building

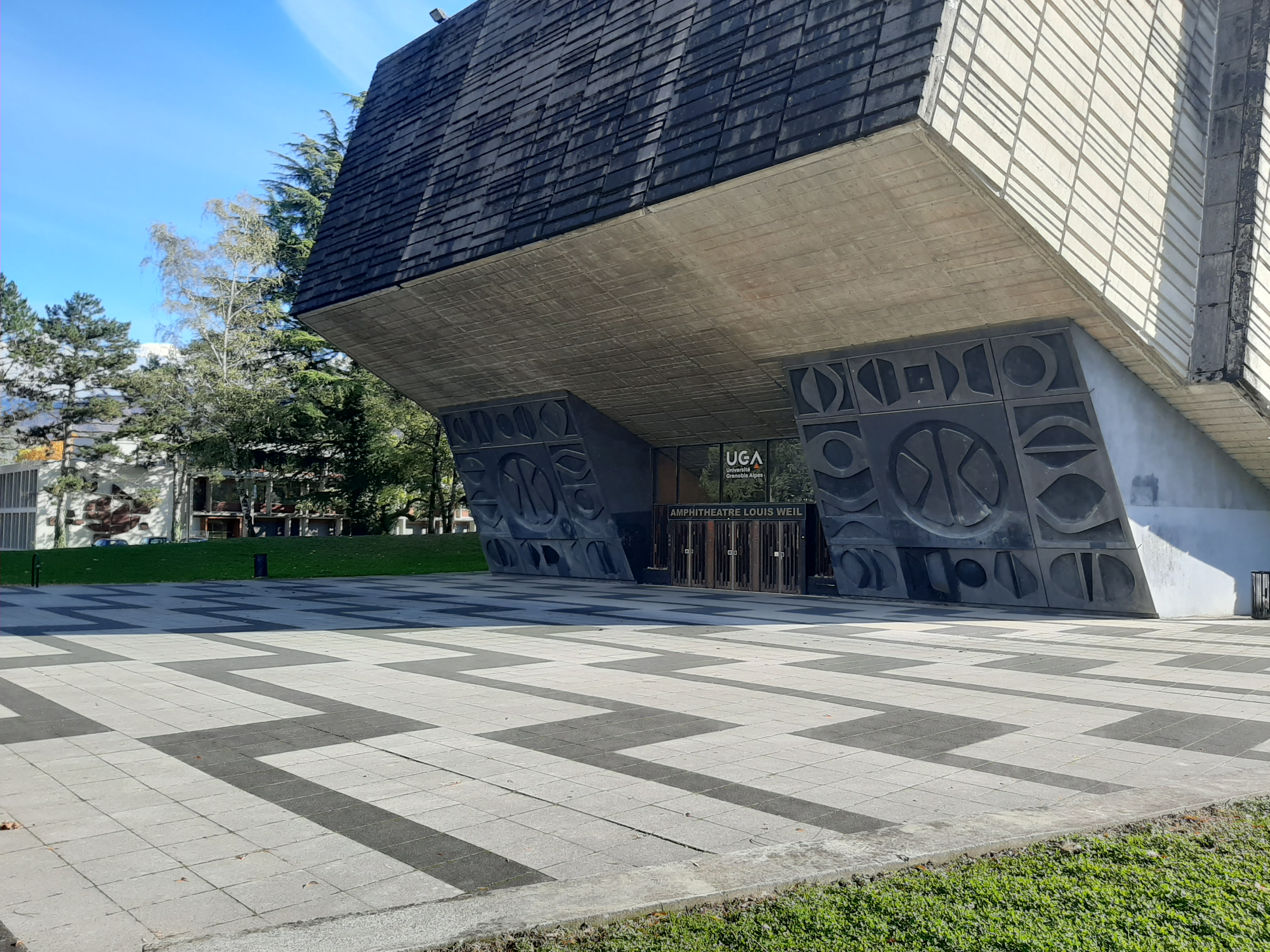
Louis Weil Amphitheatre

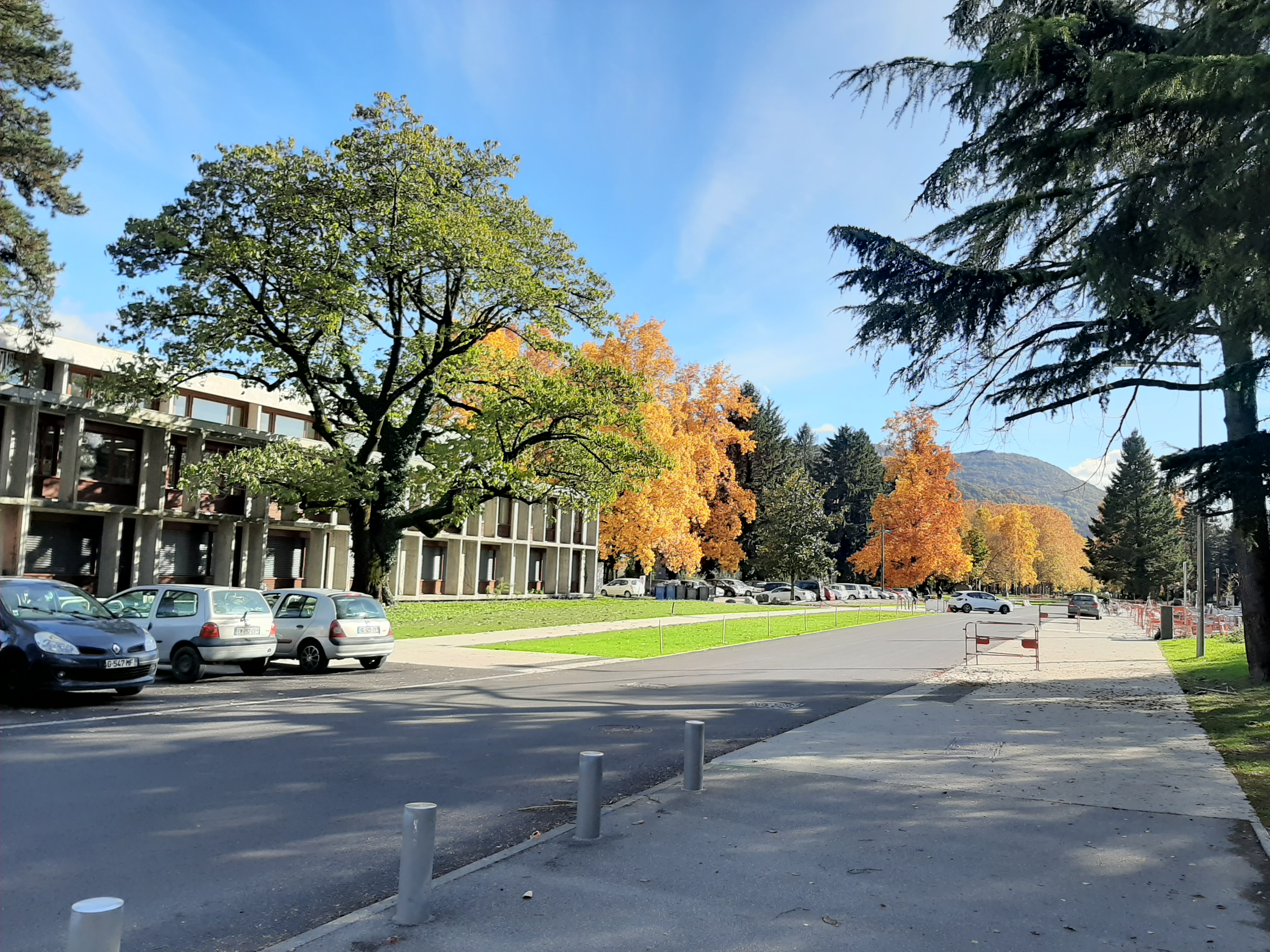
Sciences Po Grenoble

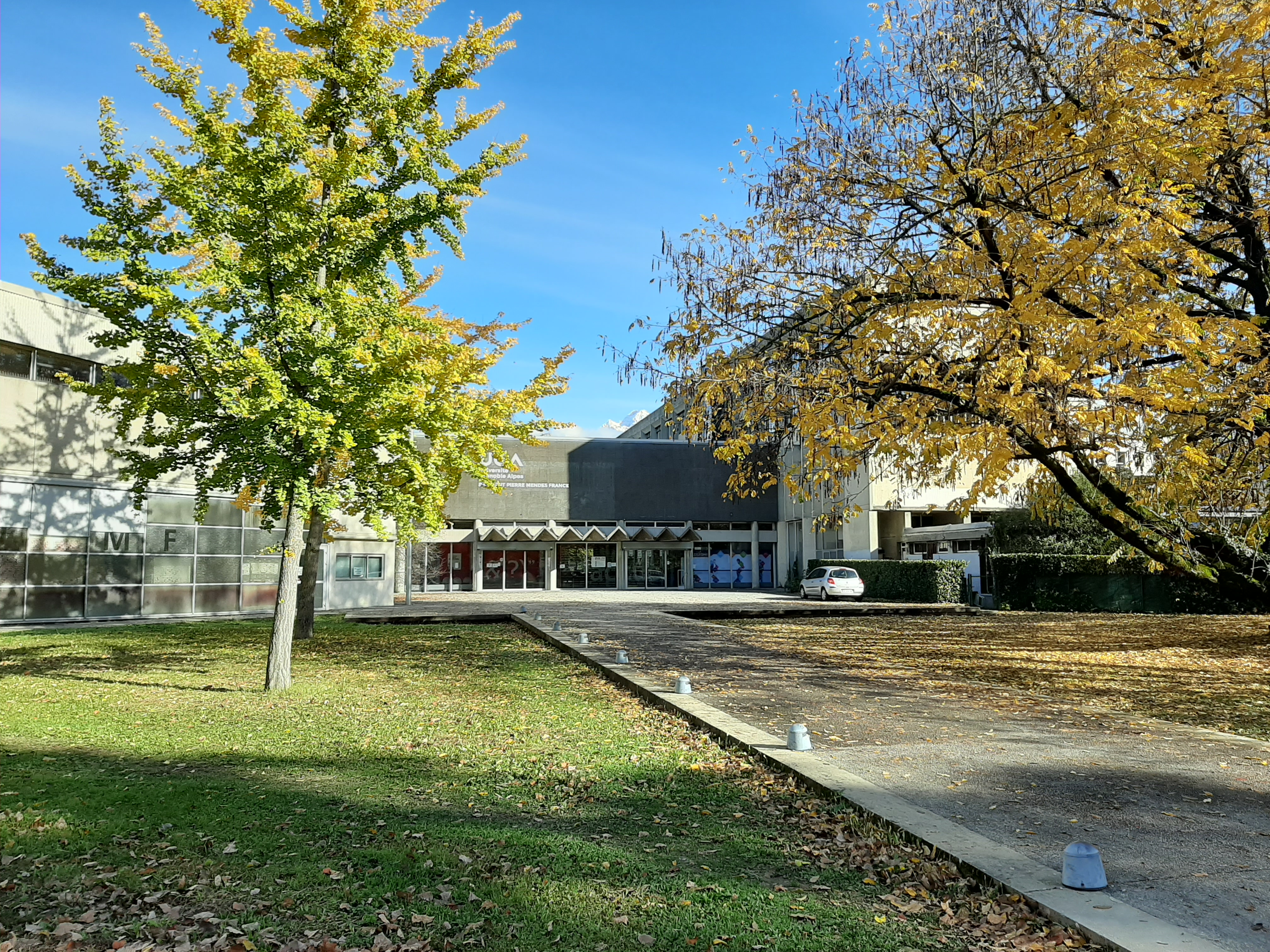
Pierre Mendes France Building

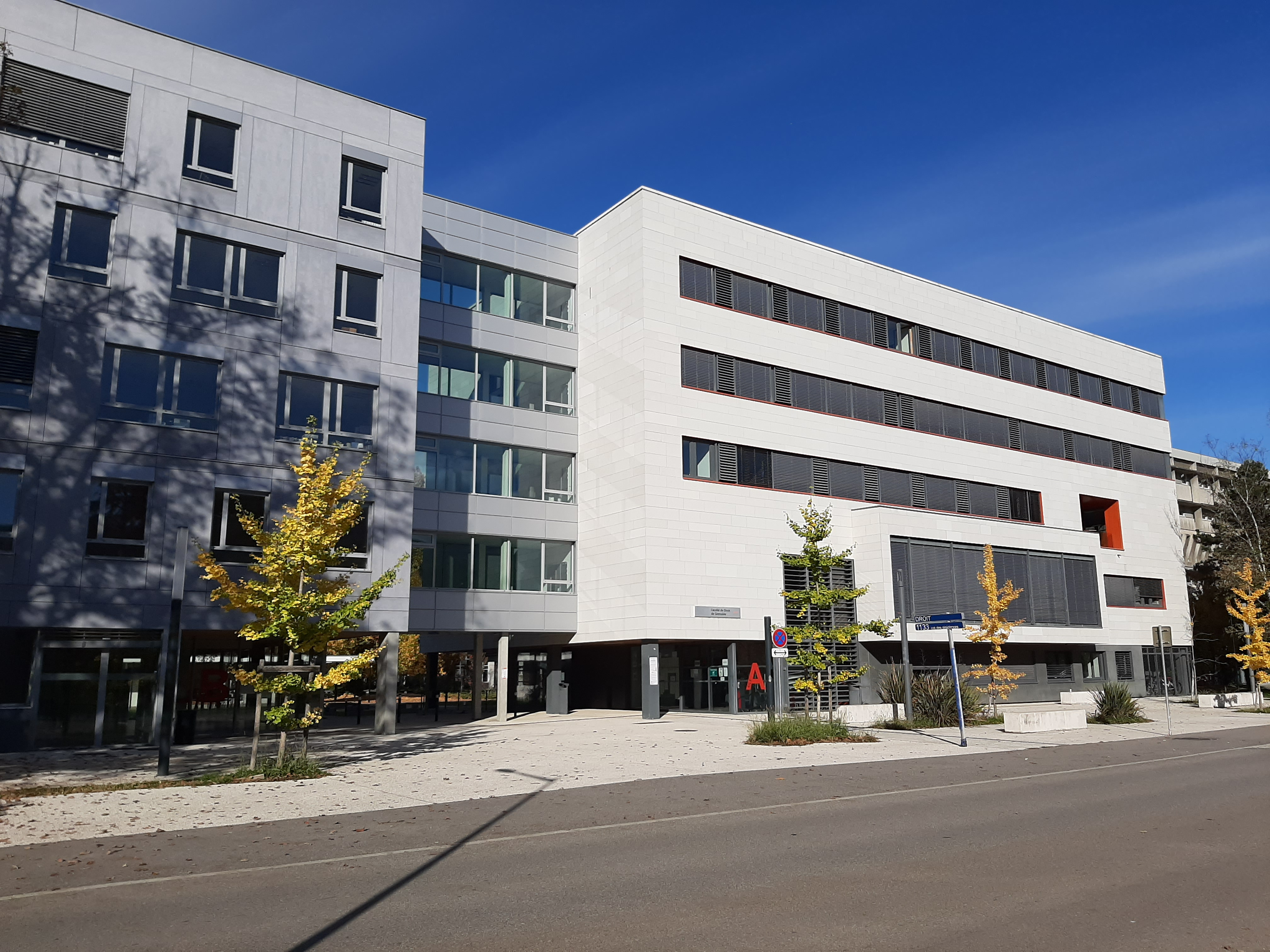
Grenoble Law School

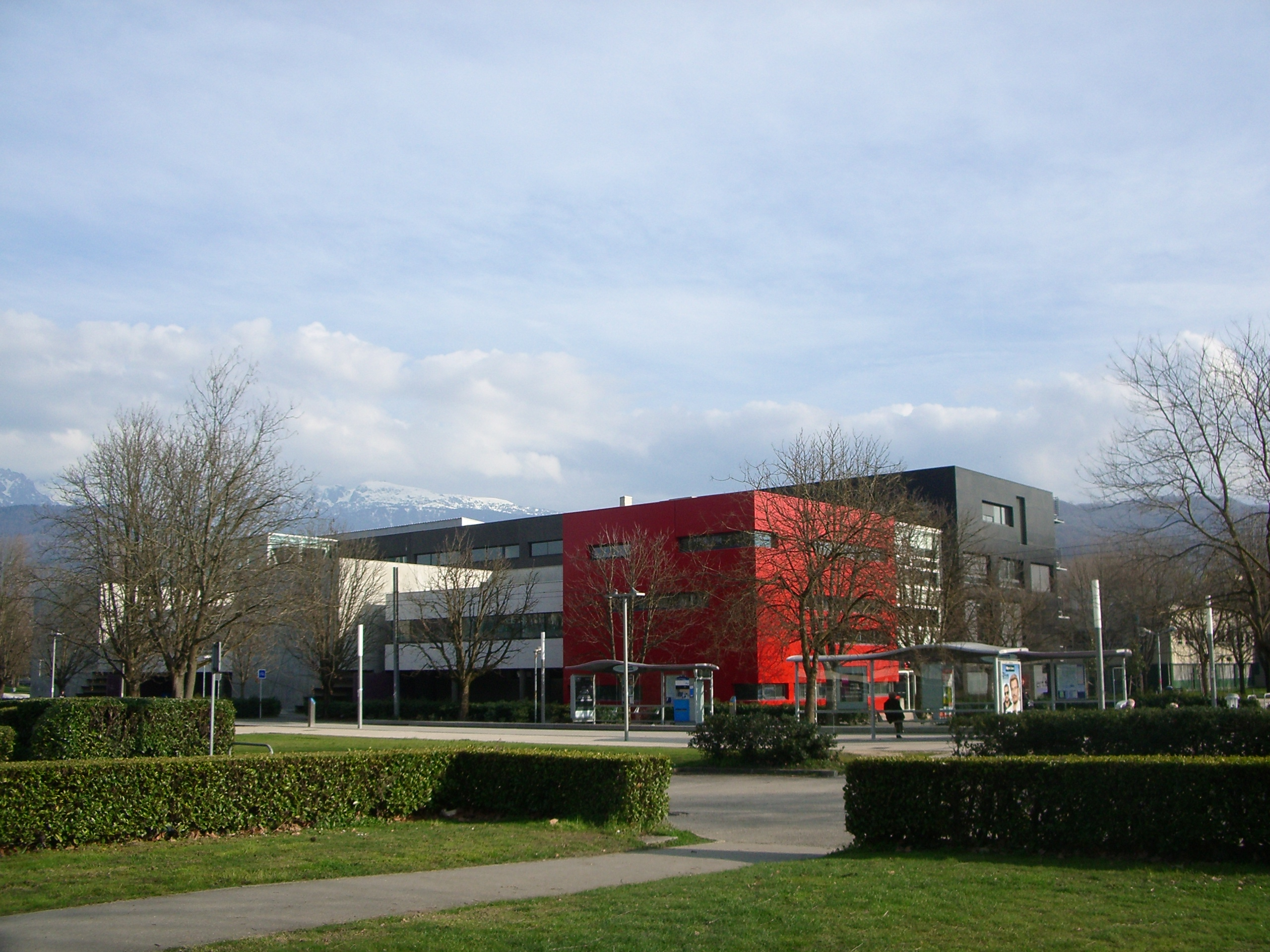
Grenoble IAE

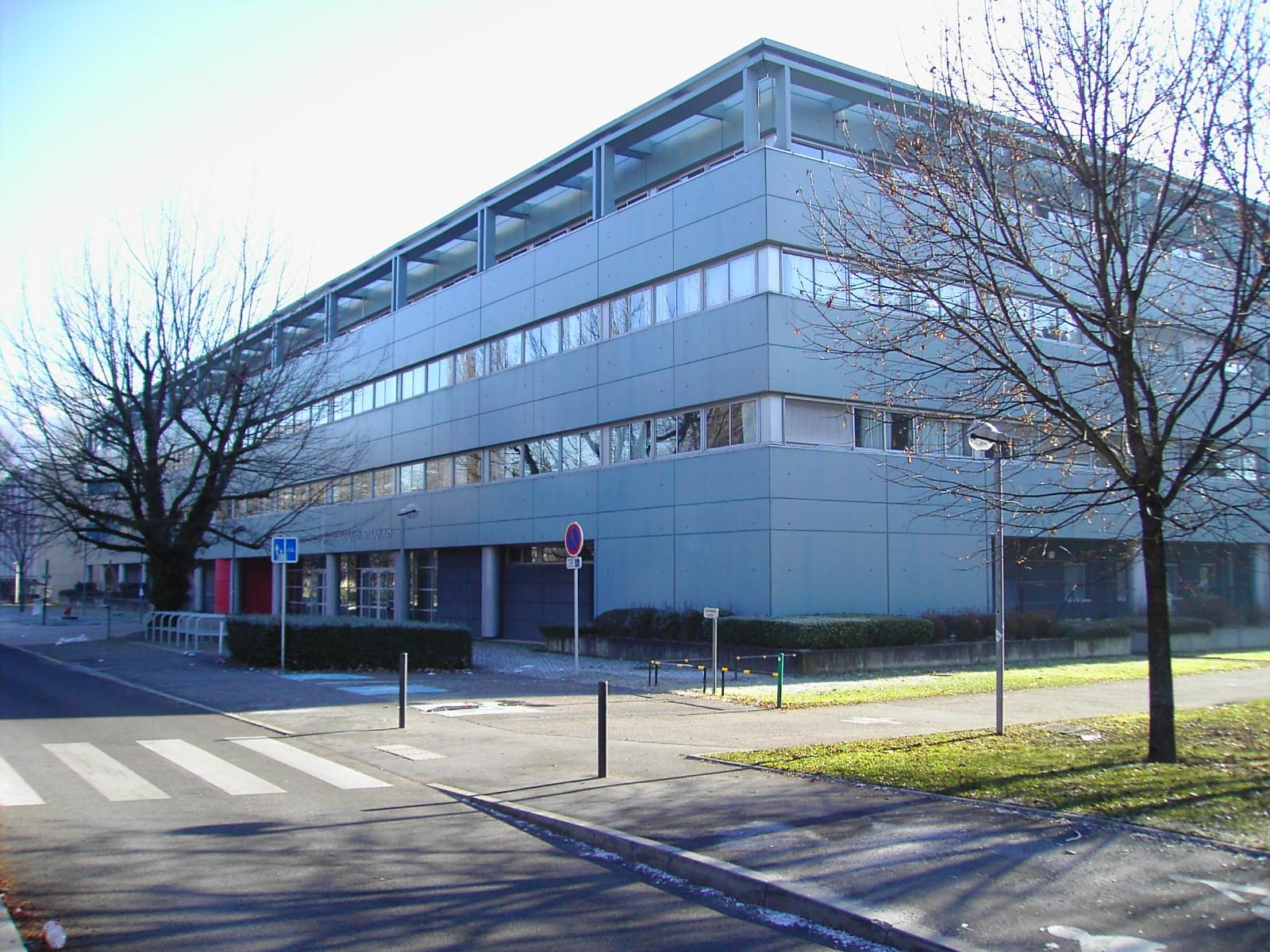
IM2AG Building

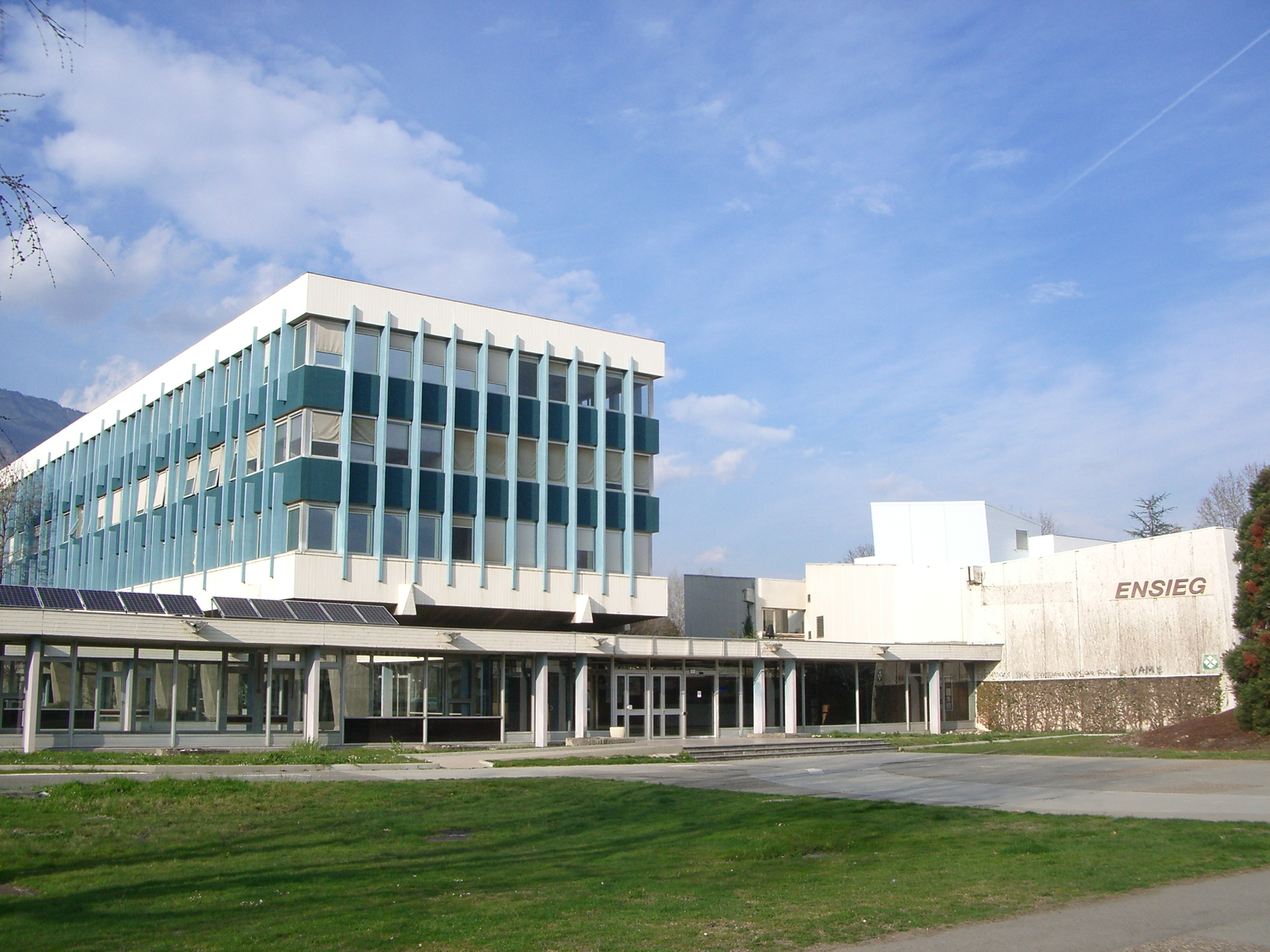
Grenoble INP buildings

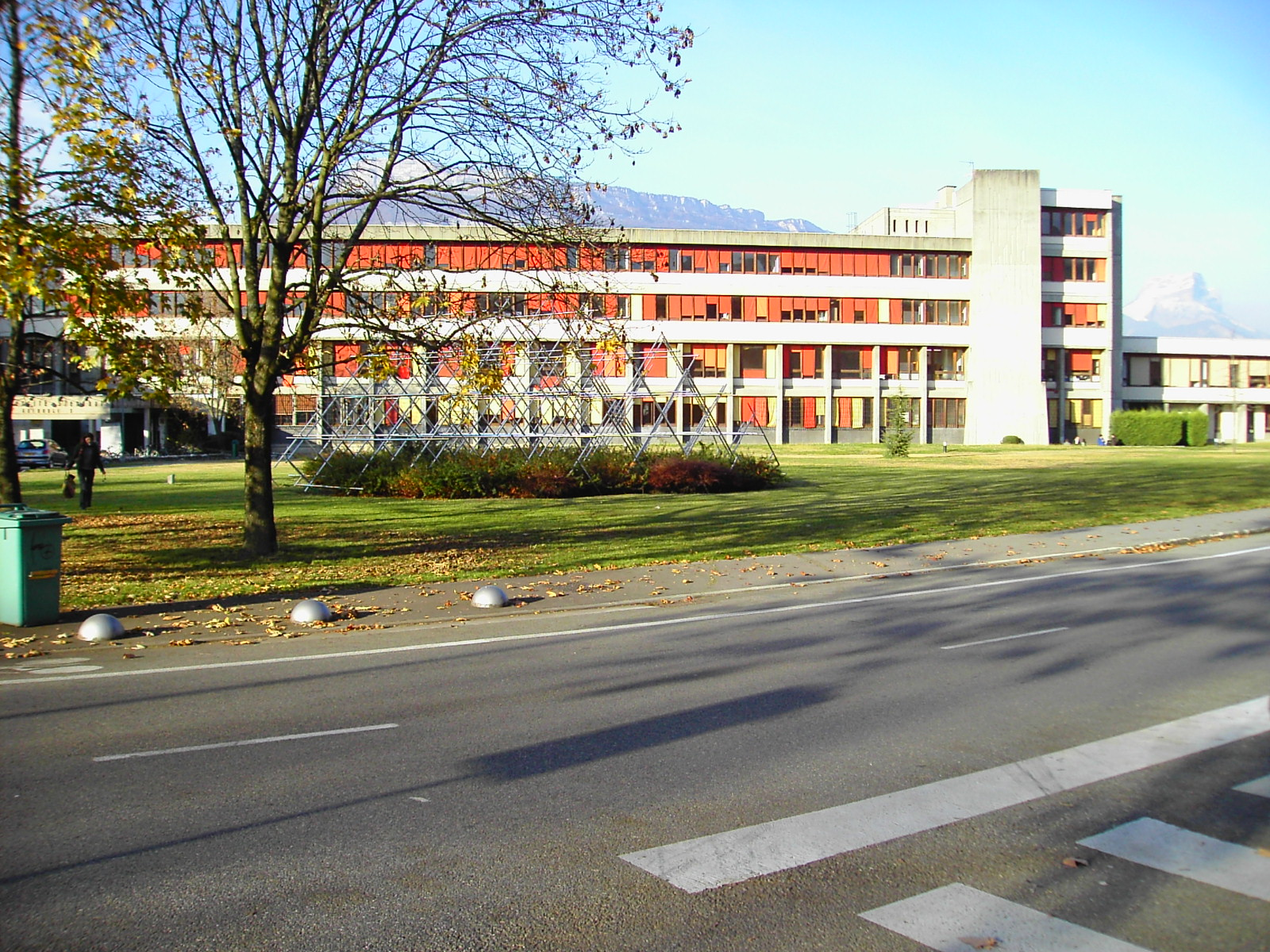
Stendhal Building

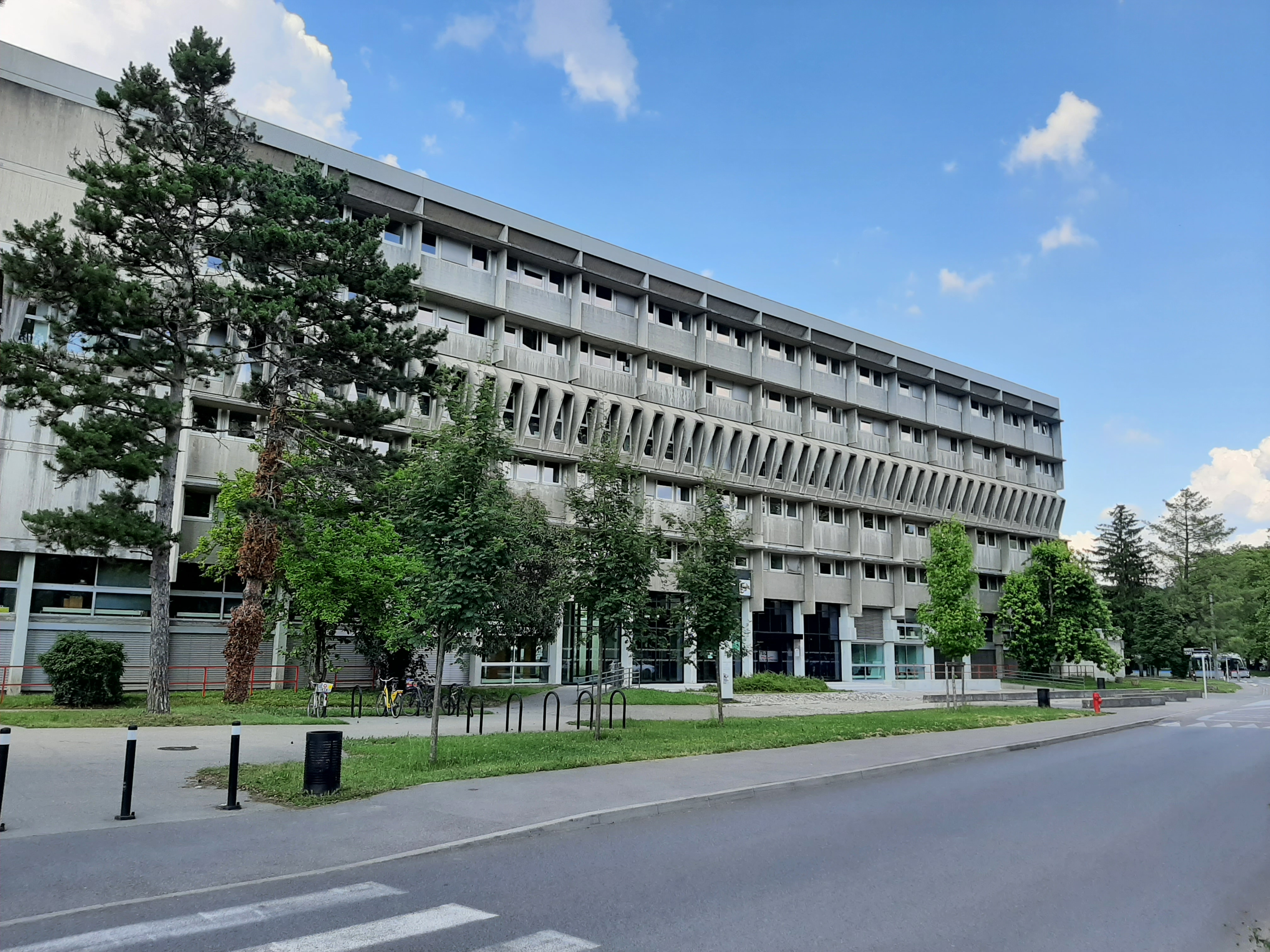
Faculty of Economics of Grenoble

=== Campus GIANT (Grenoble) ===
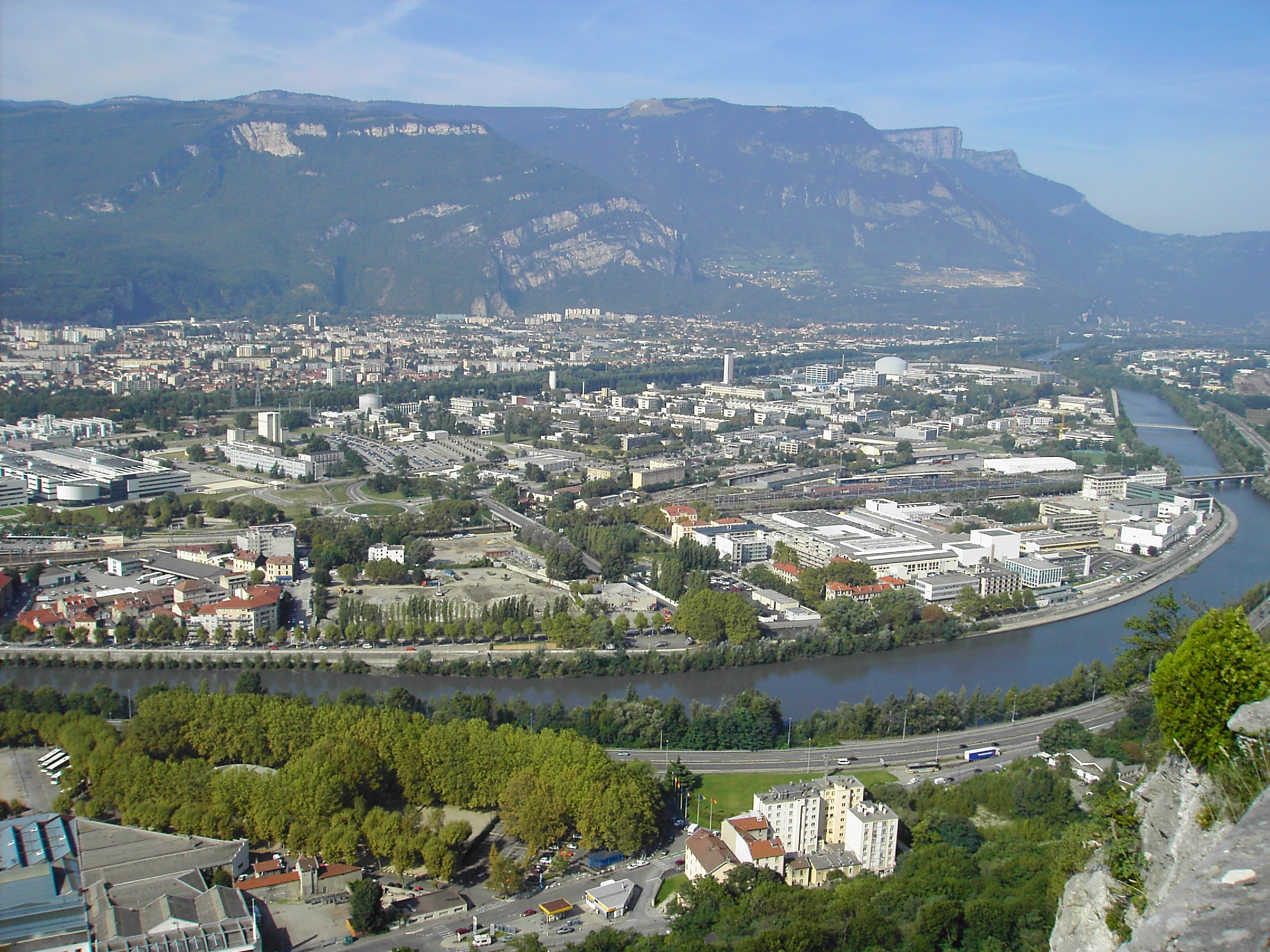
Campus GIANT

Campus GIANT (Grenoble Innovation for Advanced New Technologies) is an inter-organizational campus located on the old military grounds of a presque-isle between Isère and Drac that formed Polygone Scientifique. The Campus hosts several educational institutions, primarily UGA (particularly the INPG) and the Grenoble School of Management. Among other members of the campus are also large state research organizations CNRS and CEA. The GIANT campus hosts Minatec, as well as several European large scale Instruments including European Synchrotron Radiation Facility, European Molecular Biology Laboratory, and Institut Laue–Langevin. Major industrial companies have facilities on campus, including bioMérieux, Schneider Electric, Siemens, and STMicroelectronics.

Contrary to the Domaine Universitaire campus, which hosts UGA and shares both educational and research roles in a variety of disciplines, the GIANT Campus is inter-organizational and leans heavily towards research-industry collaboration in natural and applied sciences.

=== Other buildings in the Grenoble area ===
The university has buildings in various locations in the Grenoble area: near the main Grenoble train station (parts of IUT1 and IUT2), Boulevard Gambetta, Place de Verdun, and in the Vigny-Musset area (Cité des Territoires).

=== Valence Campus ===
The Valence campus is home to over 4,000 students in undergraduate and post-graduate programs. It is located in the department of Drôme, 90 km away from Grenoble. The Valence campus is the successor of the Université de Valence founded in 1452 by Dauphin Louis, future King Louis XI. The University of Valence was closed in 1792 sharing the fate of most French universities during the French Revolution.

=== Other locations ===
University facilities are also located outside of main campuses.

- An alpine botanical garden Jardin botanique alpin du Lautaret spans over a 2 hectares area in Col du Lautaret.
- IUT2 runs a department of management of companies and administration (GEA) in Vienne.
- A center for agricultural research and teaching is run inside the Olivier de Serres domain in Ardèche.
- Les Houches School of Physics in Haute Savoie
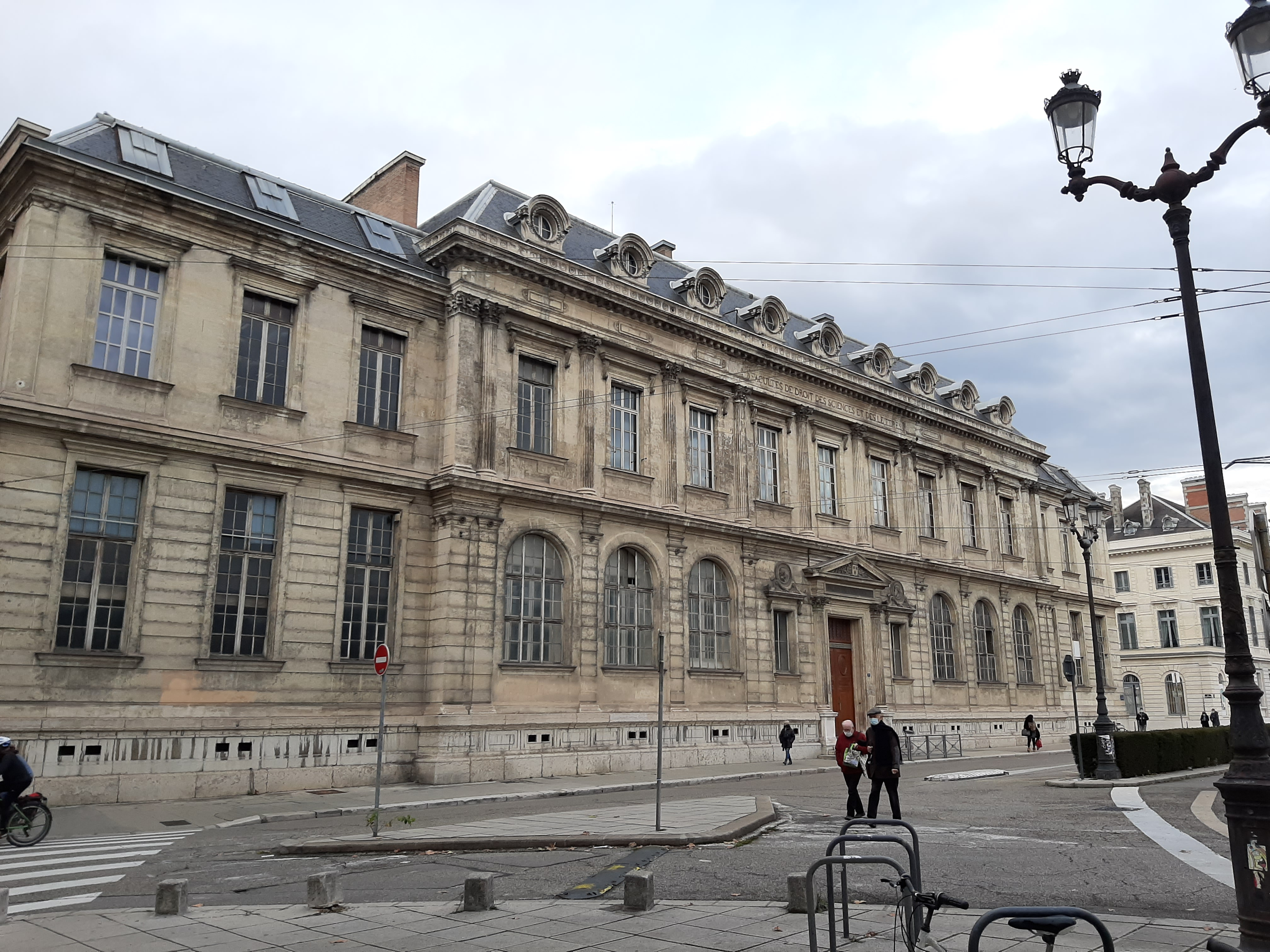
IUT Grenoble 1 (Grenoble)

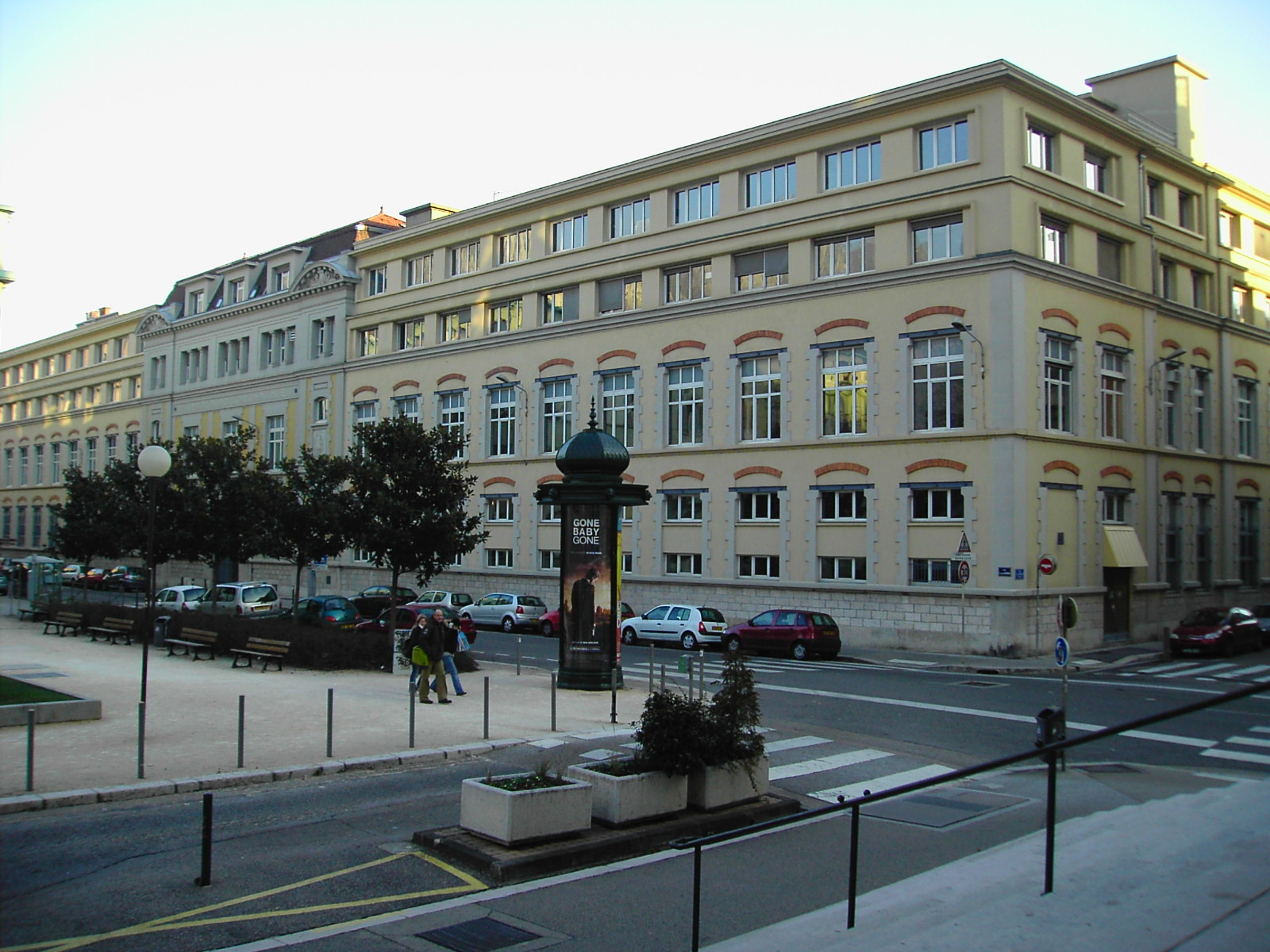
Grenoble INP (Grenoble)

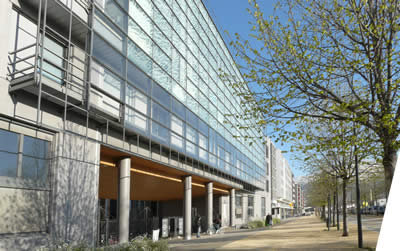
IUGA (Grenoble)

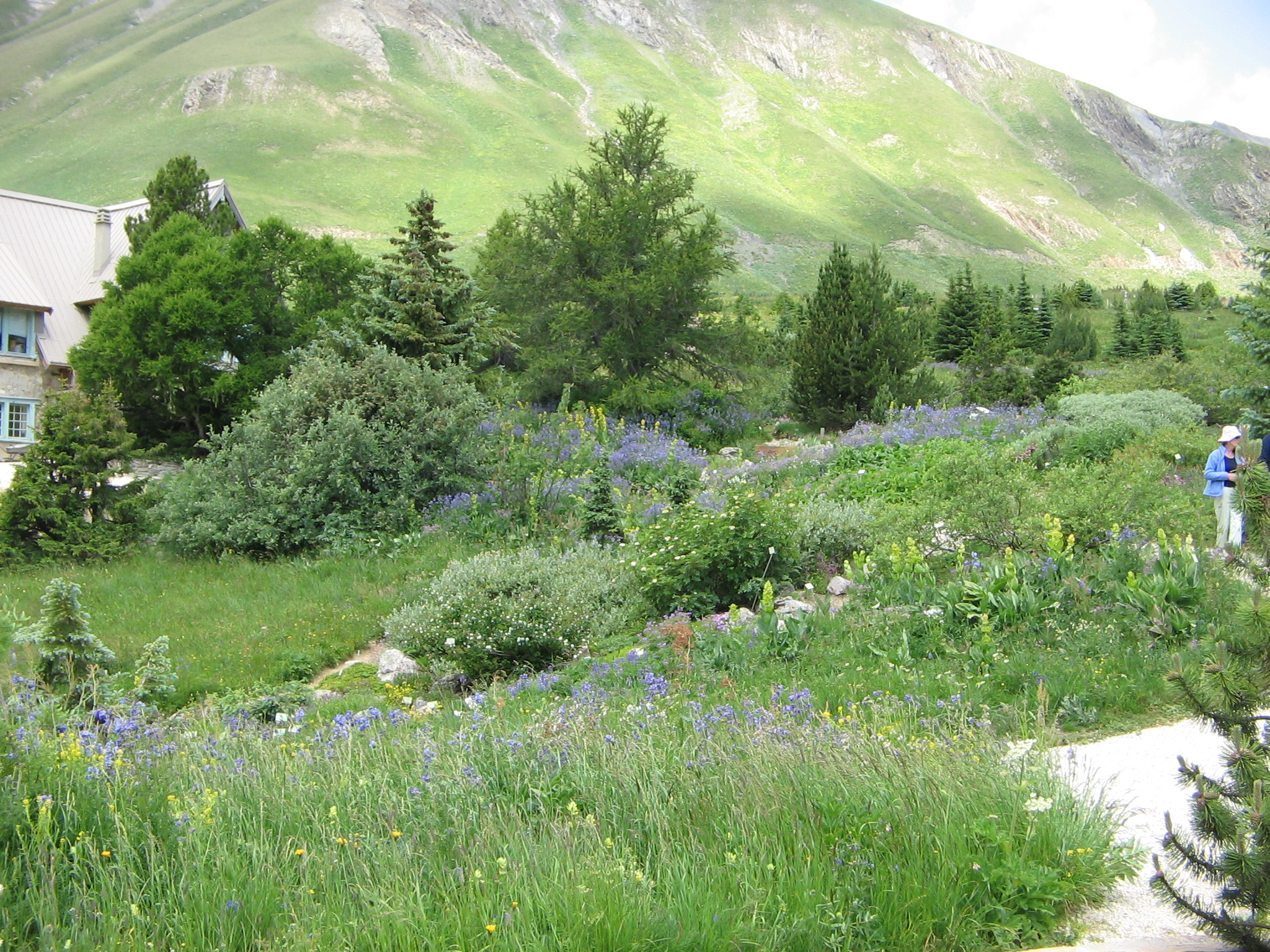
Alpine botanical garden

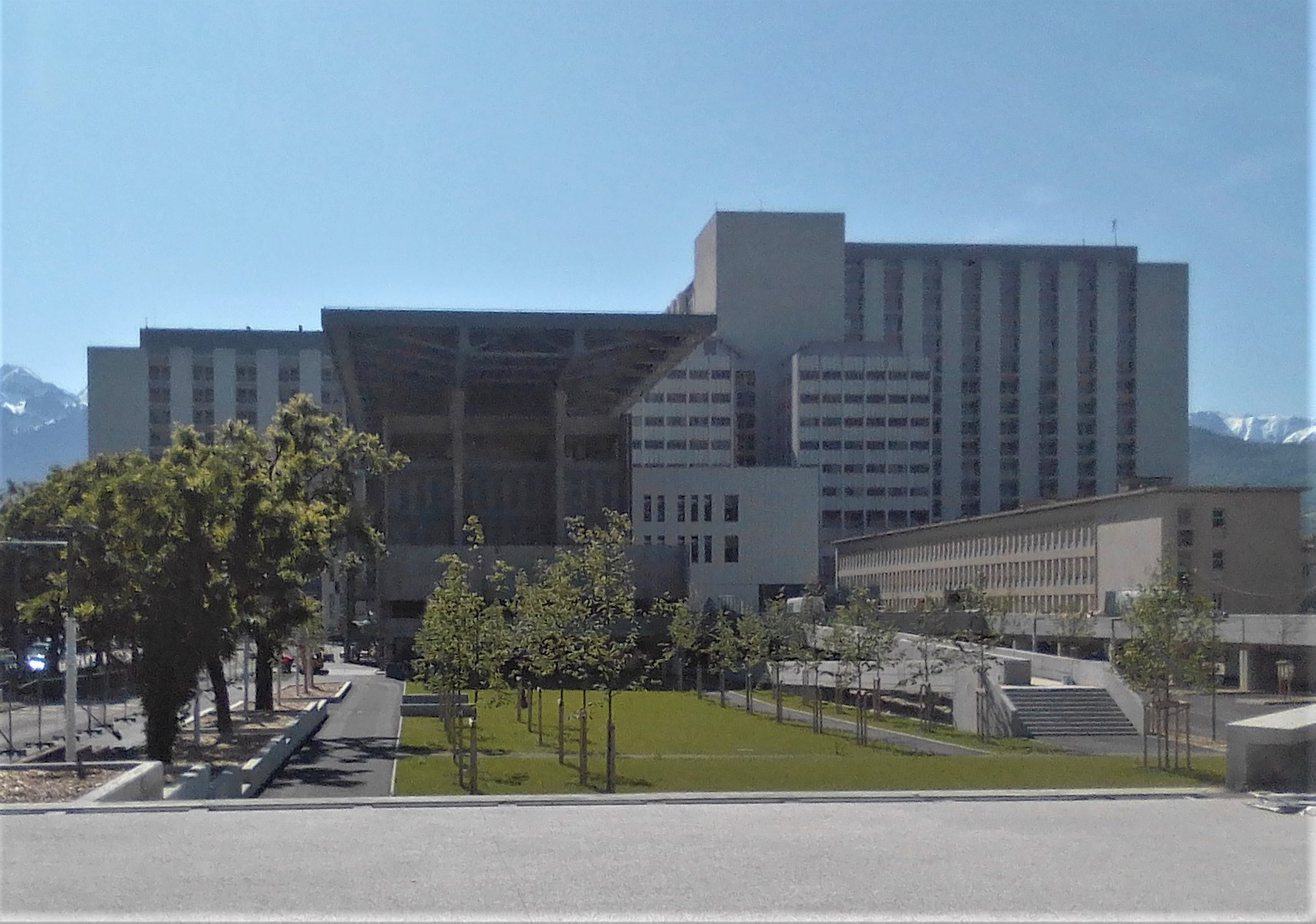
Grenoble Alpes University Hospital

== Governance ==
The Université Grenoble Alpes is a Public Institution of Scientific, Cultural, and Professional Relevance (French: Établissement public à caractère scientifique, culturel et professionnel"). It is governed by a board of directors and an academic council elected every four years. The president of the university is elected by the board of Directors after each renewal, and is eligible for re-election once. On 3 December 2015, staff and students from Joseph Fourier University, Pierre Mendès-France University, and Stendhal University voted to elect representatives to the central councils of the new university. On 7 January 2016, the Board of Directors of the Université Grenoble Alpes elected Lise Dumasy as president. It was the first time a woman has been elected to head a merged university in France.

The university was one of the central members of the Community Université Grenoble Alpes, a COMUE under the presidency of Patrick Lévy. The association allowed the humanities and social sciences and natural and formal sciences to be represented in the governance of the entire university system of Grenoble.

On 1 January 2020 the ComUE merged with the university, together with the Grenoble Institute of Technology, the Grenoble Institute of Political Studies, and the Grenoble School of Architecture ENSAG. The merger was organized using the newly created legal form of "établissements expérimentaux" created by the French government to promote the development of leading national universities. Yassine Lakhnech became the President of the newly merged university. He was re-elected to the presidency on 11 January 2024; however the administrative court of Grenoble ruled that the elections of the university boards of November 2023 were insincere. A provisional administrator was then appointed. After a new round of elections of the boards in April 2024, Yassine Lakhnech was again elected president on 16 May 2024 for a four-year mandate.

== Academics ==
University rankings
- Université Grenoble Alpes

Global – Overall
- ARWU World: 101–150 (2023)
- QS World: 321 (2026)
- Reuters World: 91 (2019)
- THE World: 301–350 (2024)
- USNWR Global: 186 (2023)

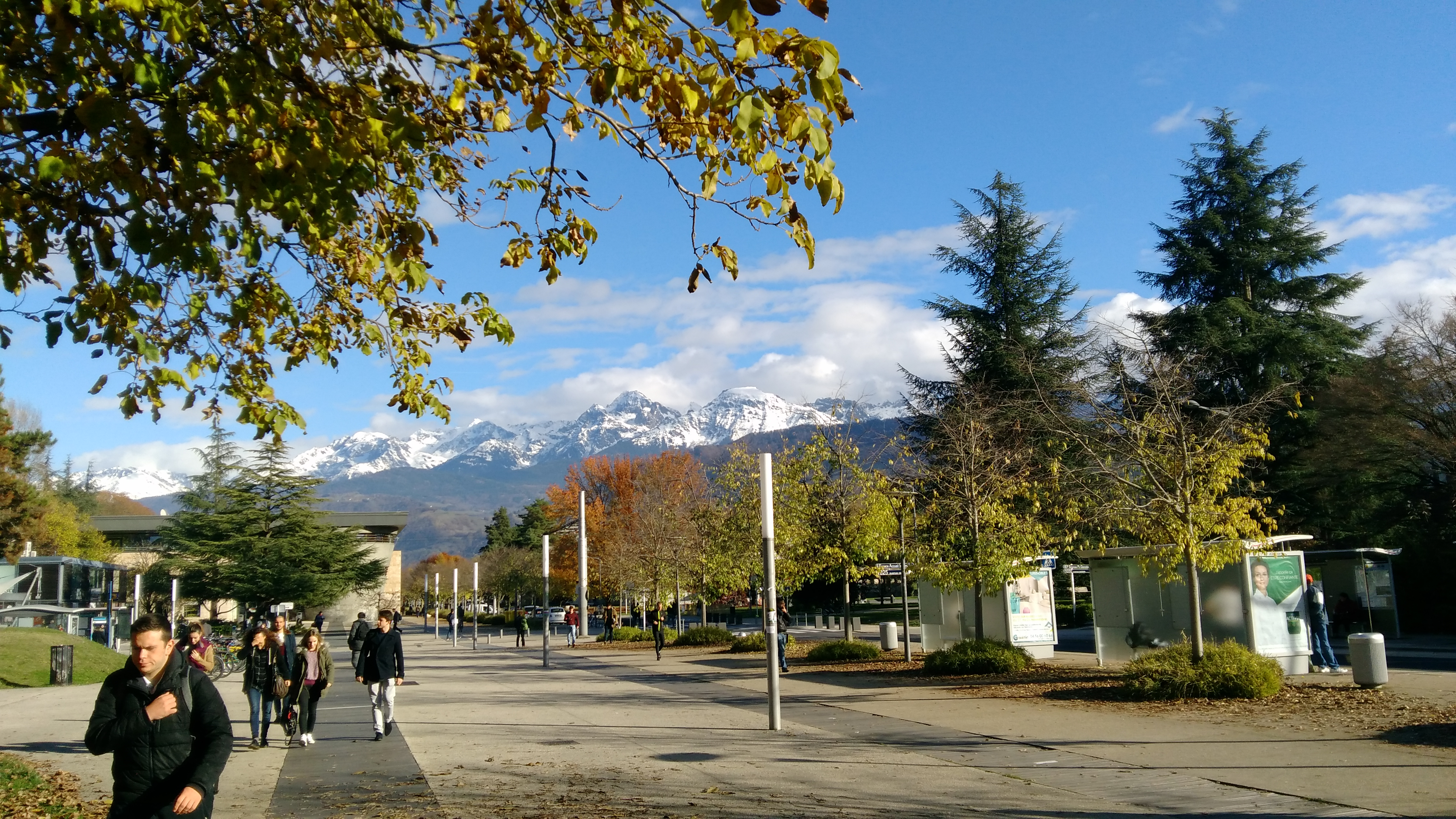
Central avenue on Main campus in Saint-Martin-d'Hères (autumn 2016).

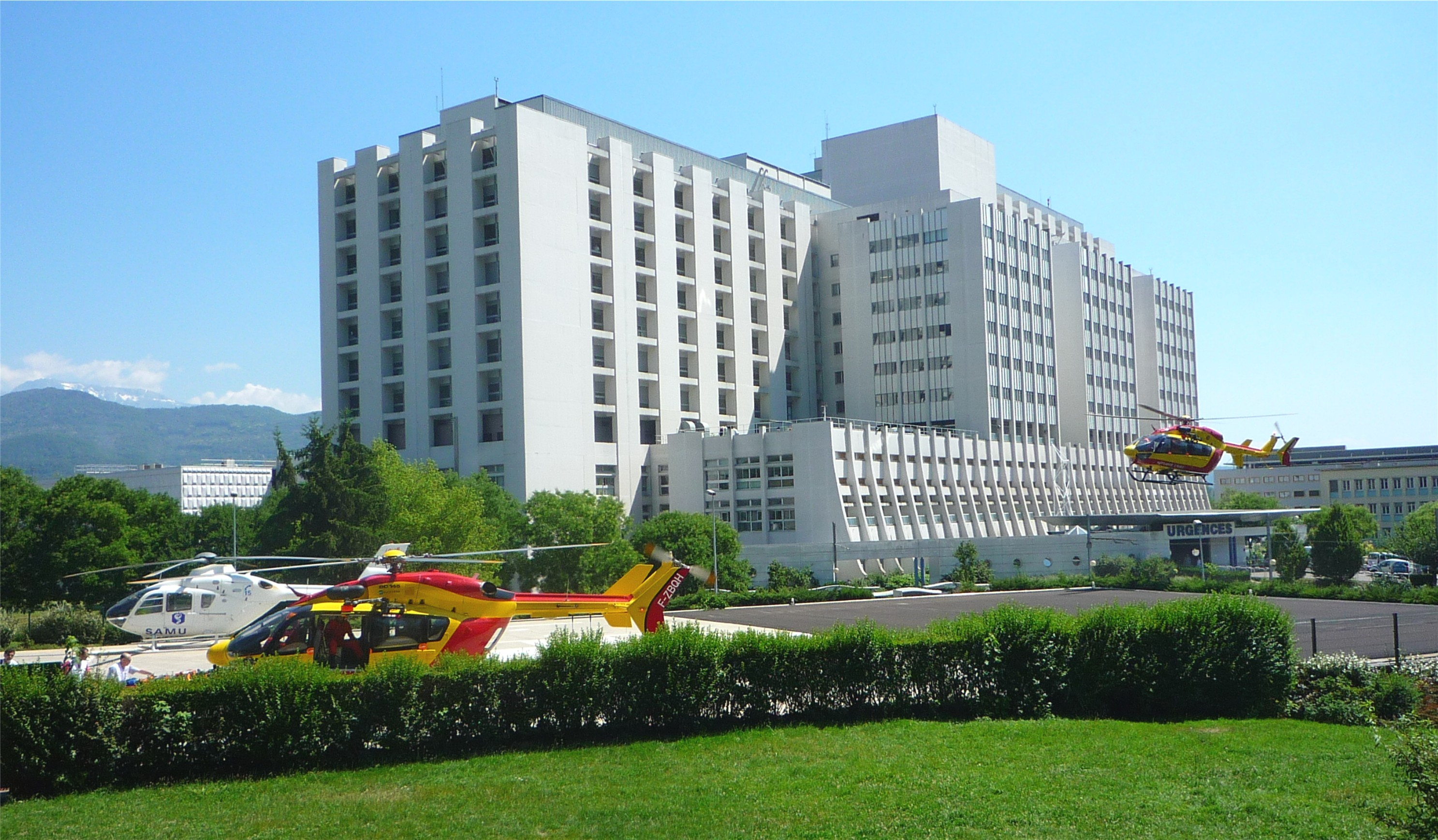
Grenoble University Hospital Center (CHU)

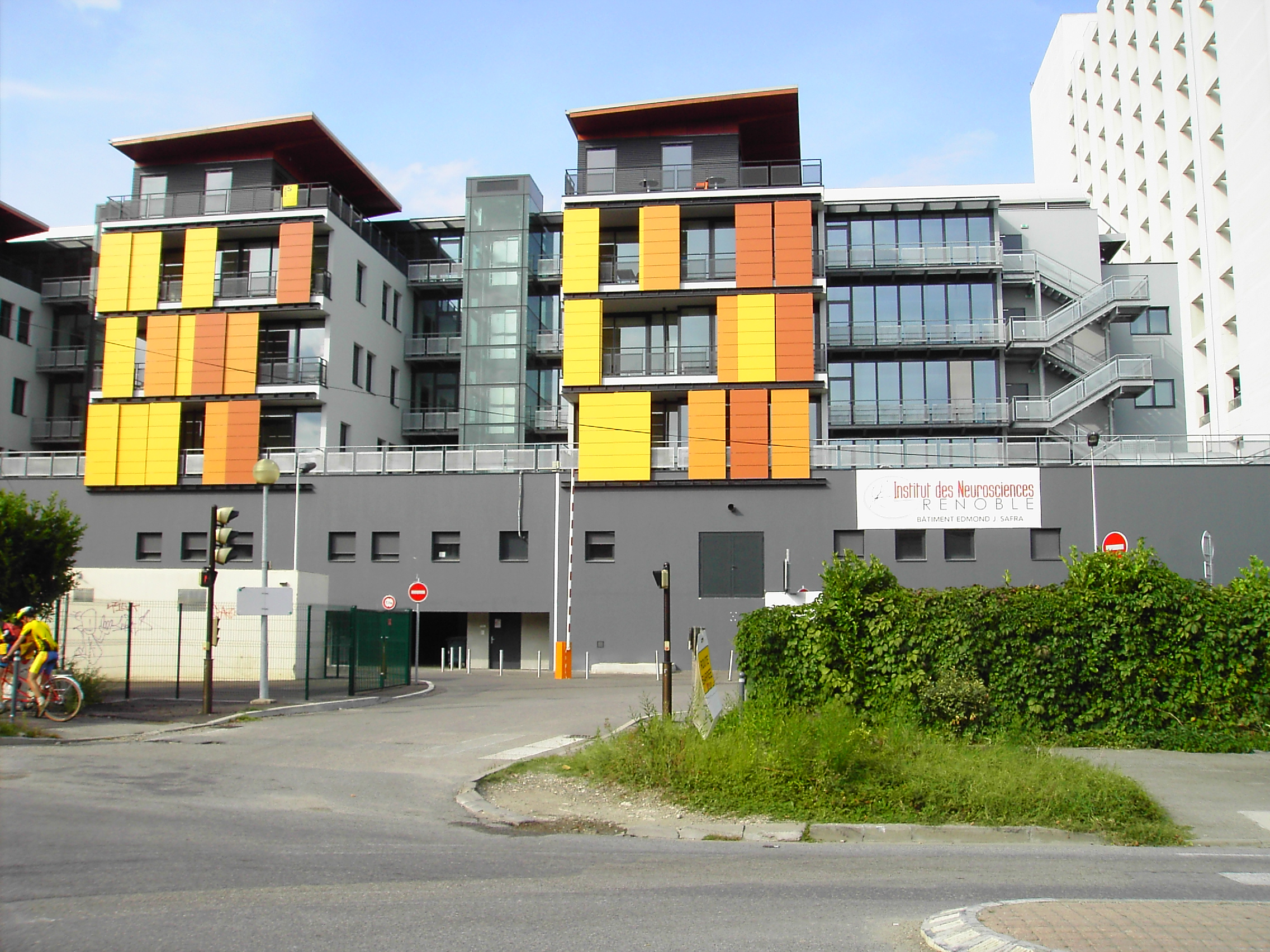
Grenoble Institute of Neuroscience (GIN)

The Université Grenoble Alpes is made up of multiple departments, schools and institutes.

- Faculty of sciences
  - Department of Chemistry and Biology
  - IM2AG - Department of Computer Science, Mathematics and Applied Mathematics of Grenoble (IM2AG)
  - PhITEM - Department of Physics, Engineering, Earth & Environmental Sciences, Mechanics
  - OSUG - Grenoble Observatory for Sciences of the Universe
  - DLST - Department for Undergraduate Degree of Sciences and Technology
- Grenoble INP
  - Ense3 - Engineering school of Energy, Water and Environmental sciences
  - Ensimag - Engineering school of Applied mathematics and Computer Science
  - Esisar - Engineering school of Advanced Systems and Networks
  - Génie industriel - School of Industrial engineering and Management
  - Pagora - Engineering school of Paper, Print media and Biomaterials
  - Phelma - Engineering school of Physics, Electronics and Materials Science
  - Grenoble IAE - Graduate School of Management
  - Polytech Grenoble - Polytechnic Engineering School
- Faculty of humanities, health, sports, society (H3S)
  - ARSH - Department of Arts and Humanities
  - LE - Department of foreign languages
  - LLASIC - Department of Languages, Literature, Performing Arts, Information and Communication
  - SHS - Department of Humanities and Social Sciences
  - STAPS - Department of physical and sports activities
  - Faculty of Medicine
  - Faculty of Pharmacology
- Faculties and departments outside of regrouping
  - Institute of Urban Planning and Alpine Geography (IUGA)
  - Grenoble Law School
  - Grenoble Faculty of Economics
- Sciences Po Grenoble - Grenoble Institute of Political Studies
- ENSAG - Grenoble School of Architecture
- University Institutes of Technology
  - IUT Grenoble 1 - University Institutes of Technology 1
  - IUT Grenoble 2 - University Institutes of Technology 2
  - IUT de Valence - Valence University Institutes of Technology
- Transverse structures
  - DSDA - Drôme Ardèche Department of Sciences
  - CUEF - University Centre for French Studies
  - INSPE - Institute of Education and Teaching
  - SDL - Languages Office
  - Doctoral College

== Research ==
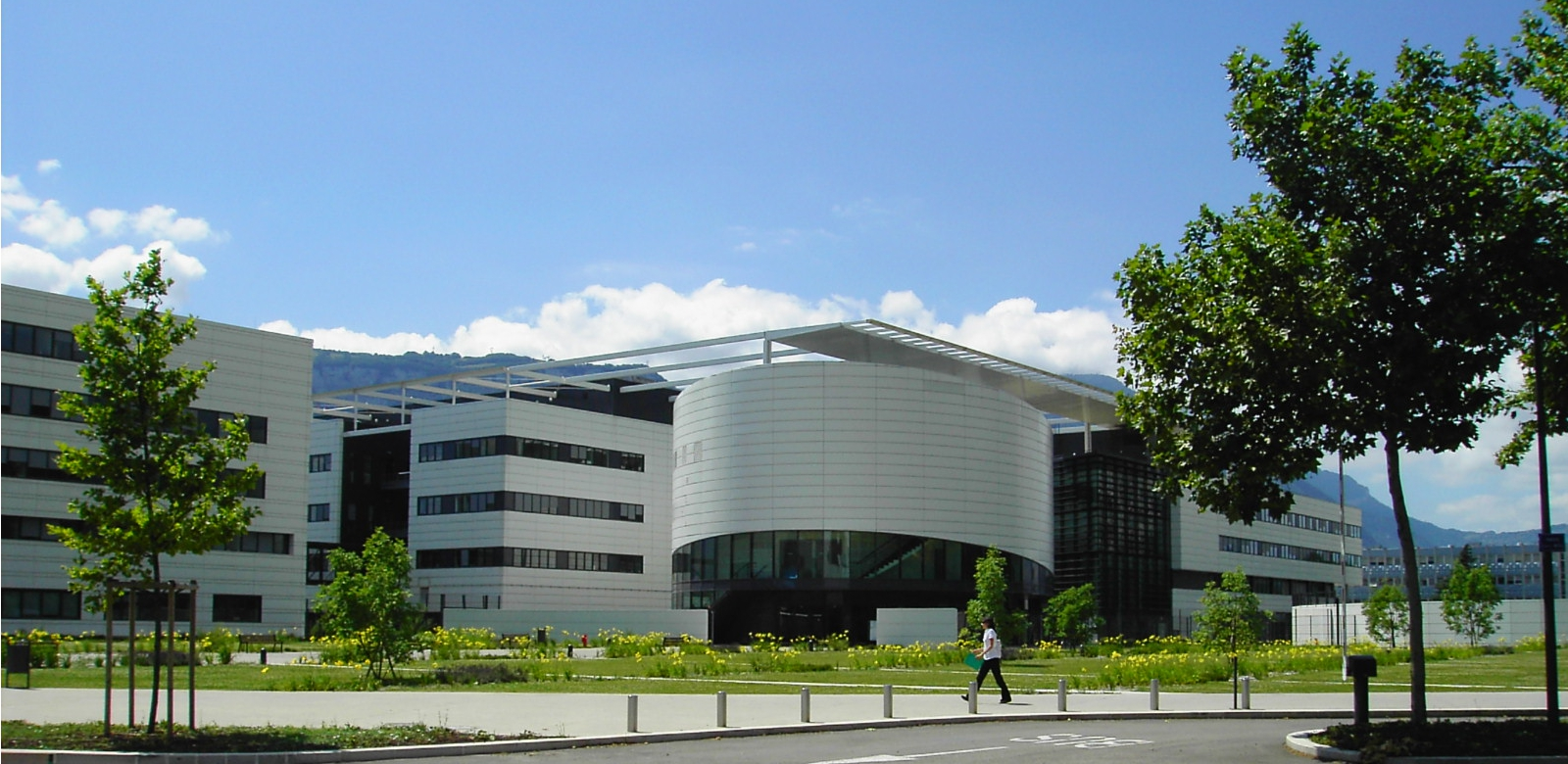
Minatec complex

Covering all disciplinary fields, the Université Grenoble Alpes has 106 research departments spread out in six centres bringing together different types of organizations (joint research departments, host teams, platforms, etc.) in the same scientific field.

- Humanities and Social Science Centre (Pôle SHS)
- Chemistry, Biology and Health Centre (Pôle CBS)
- Mathematics, Information and Communication Sciences and Technologies Centre (Pôle MSTIC)
- Particle Physics, Astrophysics, Geosciences, the Environment and Ecology Centre (Pôle PAGE)
- Physics, Engineering and Materials Centre (Pôle PEM)
- Social Sciences Centre (Pôle SS)

Multiple research labs are attached to the university. University Grenoble Alpes, though Grenoble INP, cofounded Minatec, an international center on micro-nano technologies, uniting over 3,000 researchers and 1,200 students.

The university hosts one of 4 French national Institutes of Artificial Intelligence.

PhD training is administered and governed by the Doctoral College, which creates rules and standards for UGA's 13 doctoral schools.

== Notable people ==
UGA's notable alumni include academics, political leaders, executives, and artists.

=== Politics ===
Many European politicians have studied law, economics, and languages at UGA, including: Reinhold Maier, Helene Weber, Walther Schreiber, Michel Destot, Louis Besson, Bernard Accoyer, Marlène Schiappa, Thierry Repentin, André Vallini and Geoffrey Acland.

Other political leaders include: Gaétan Barrette, Minister of Health and Social Services of Canada; Paul Kaba Thieba, Prime Minister of Burkina Faso; Abderrahmane Benkhalfa, Minister of Finance of Algeria; Hazem El Beblawi, Prime Minister of Egypt; Richard E. Hoagland, US Ambassador; Abdoulaye Wade, President of Senegal; Driss Basri, Interior Minister of Morocco; Ahmedou Ould-Abdallah, Ambassador for Mauritania; Şenkal Atasagun, Chief of the National Intelligence Organization of Turkey; Ignas Jonynas, Lithuanian diplomat; Bill Morneau, Canadian Minister of Finance; Souvanna Phouma, Prime Minister of Laos; Ali Al Shami, Minister of Foreign Affairs of Lebanon; Fathallah Sijilmassi, Moroccan politician and economist; Mohammed al-Dairi Minister of Foreign Affairs of Libya.

UGA alumni also include American journalist Warren D. Leary, French journalists Éric Conan, Olivier Galzi, Mélissa Theuriau Françoise Joly, Laurent Mauduit, Marc Dugain, Philippe Robinet, Caroline Roux, British Joanna Gosling and Safia Shah, and German Jona von Ustinov, who worked for MI5 during the time of the Nazi regime.

Among social activists who attended UGA, one could find Léo-Paul Lauzon, Léa Roback, Austin Mardon, and the former CEO of the Chicago Urban League James Compton.

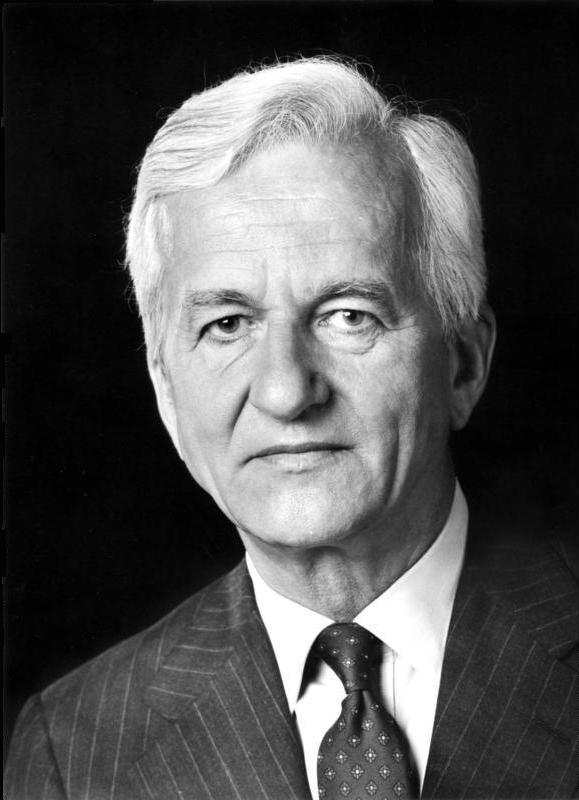
Richard von Weizsäcker, President of Germany

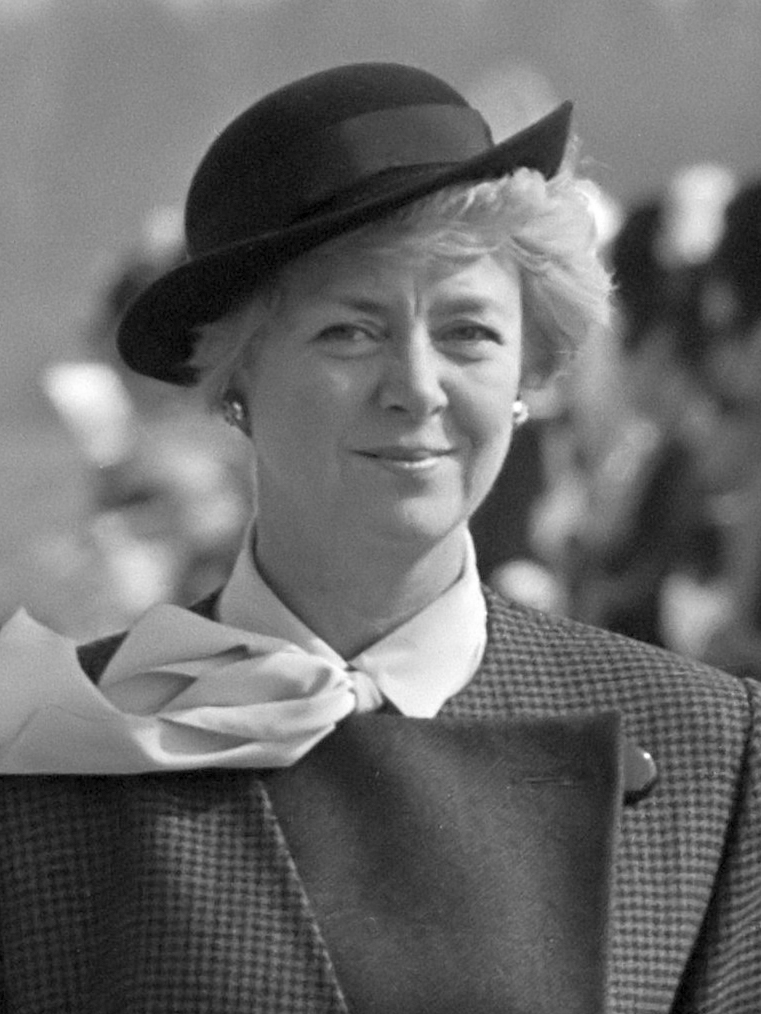
Vigdís Finnbogadóttir, President of Iceland

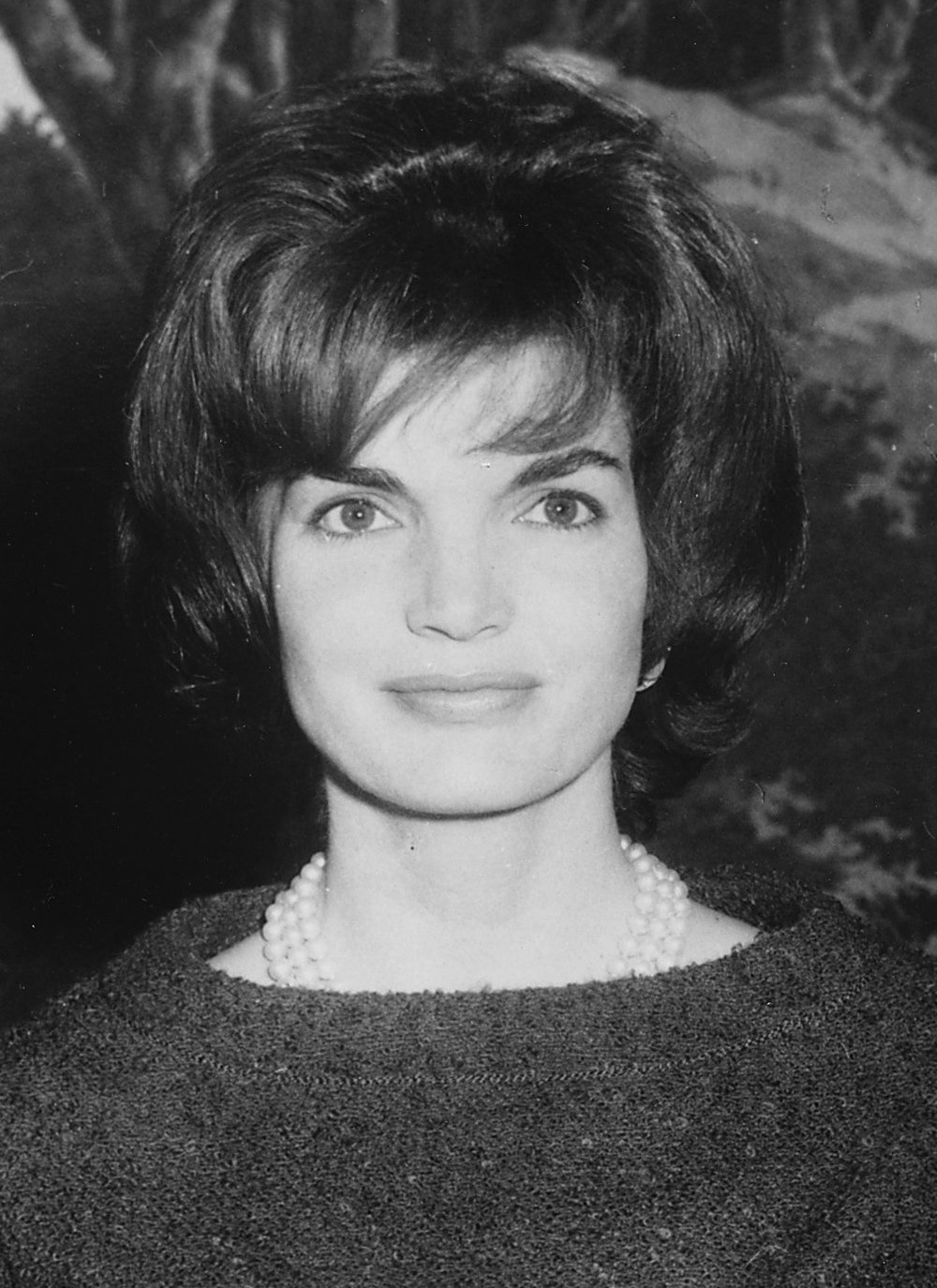
Jacqueline Kennedy, First Lady of the United States

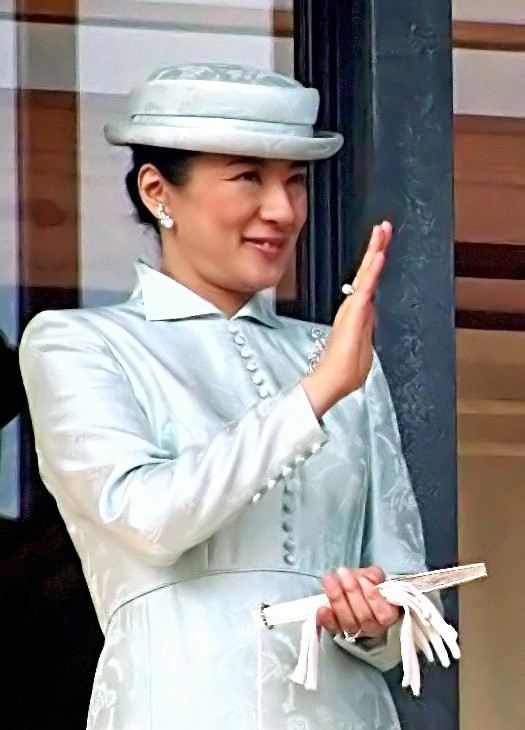
Masako Owada, Empress of Japan

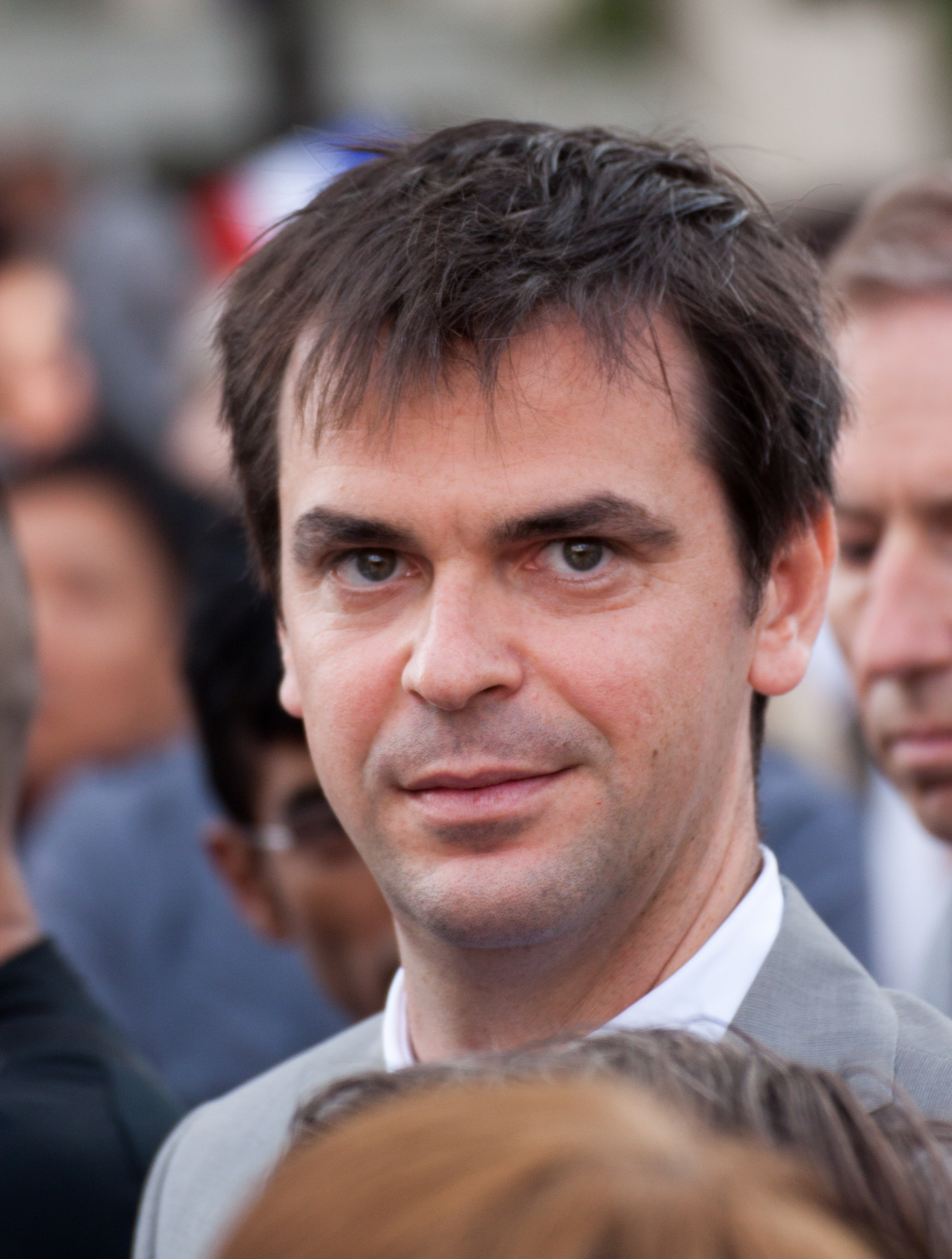
Olivier Véran, French politician, Minister of Health

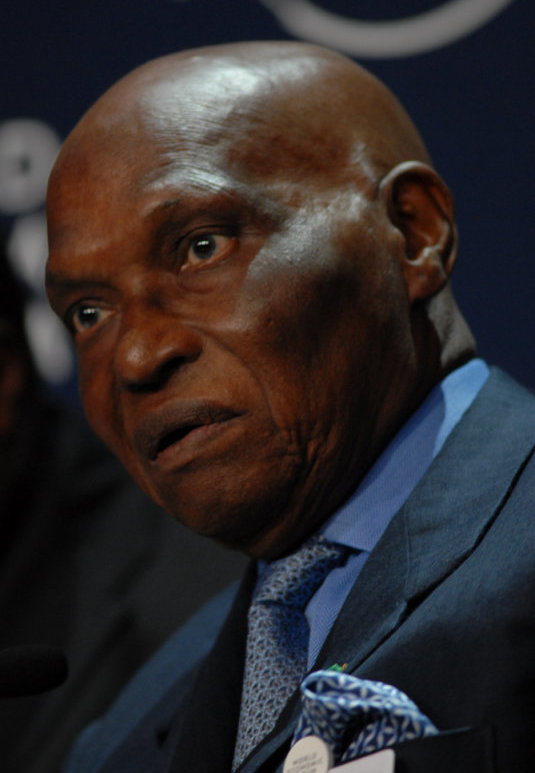
Abdoulaye Wade, President of Senegal

=== Mathematics and sciences ===
Numerous prominent scientists have studied at the Université Grenoble Alpes since the development of the hydro-power in the region in 1880s. Prominent fields include physics, material sciences, and computer sciences with alumni like Yves Bréchet, member of the French Academy of Sciences; Rajaâ Cherkaoui El Moursli, who worked on the Higgs boson discovery; Patrick Cousot, French computer scientist; Joseph Sifakis, Turing Award laureate; Claude Boutron, French glaciologist; Jean-Louis Coatrieux, French researcher in medical imaging; Michel Cosnard, French computer scientist; Paul Trendelenburg, German pharmacologist; Yousef Saad, computer scientist; Gérard Mourou, Nobel Prize laureate, Maurice Nivat, Catherine Ritz, French Antarctic researcher; Eric Goles, Chilean mathematician; Pierre Colmez, French mathematician; René Alphonse Higonnet, French engineer; Marlon Dumas, Honduran computer scientist; Claire Berger, French physicist and Michel Campillo, French seismologist.

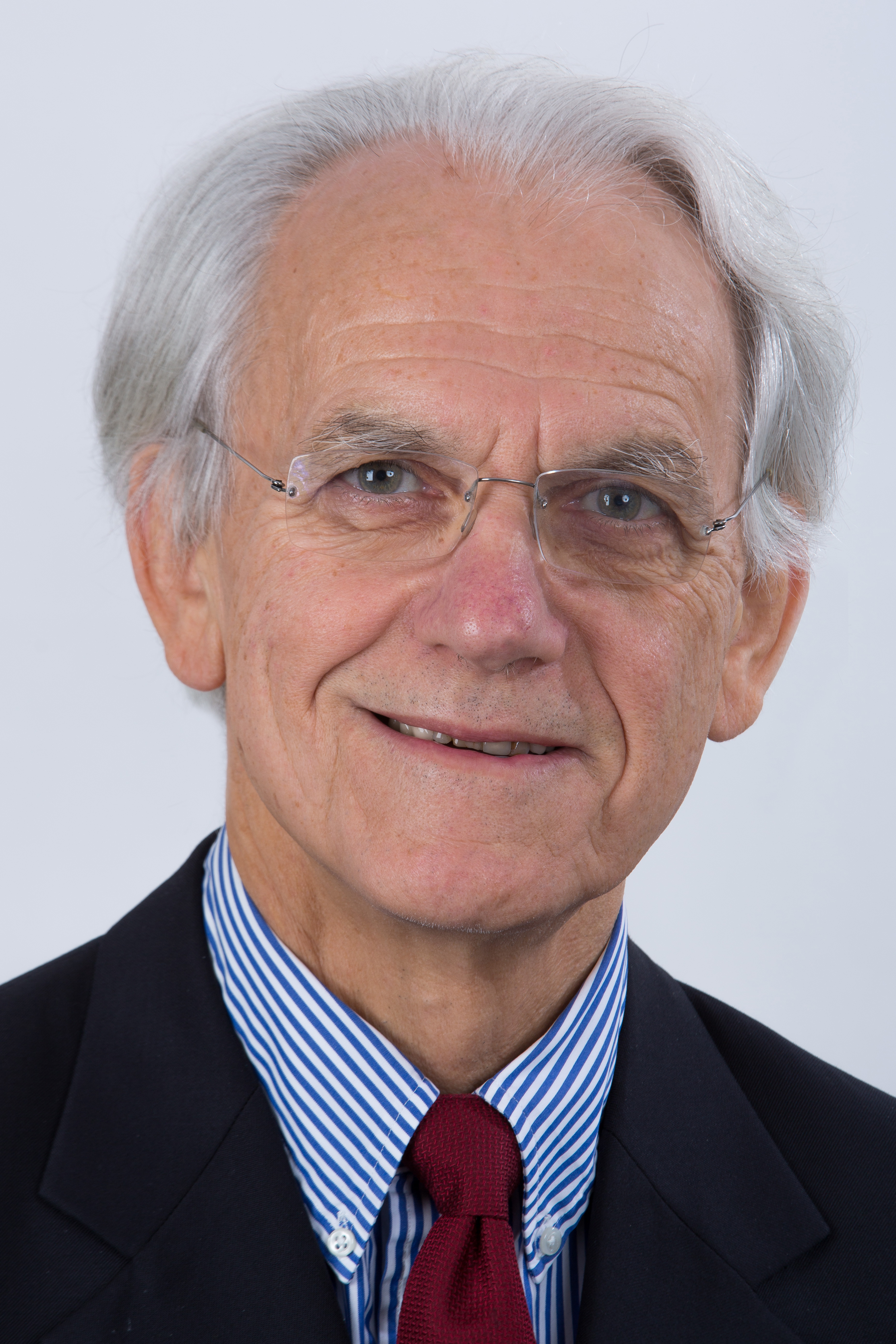
Gérard Mourou, Physicist & 2018 Nobel laureate

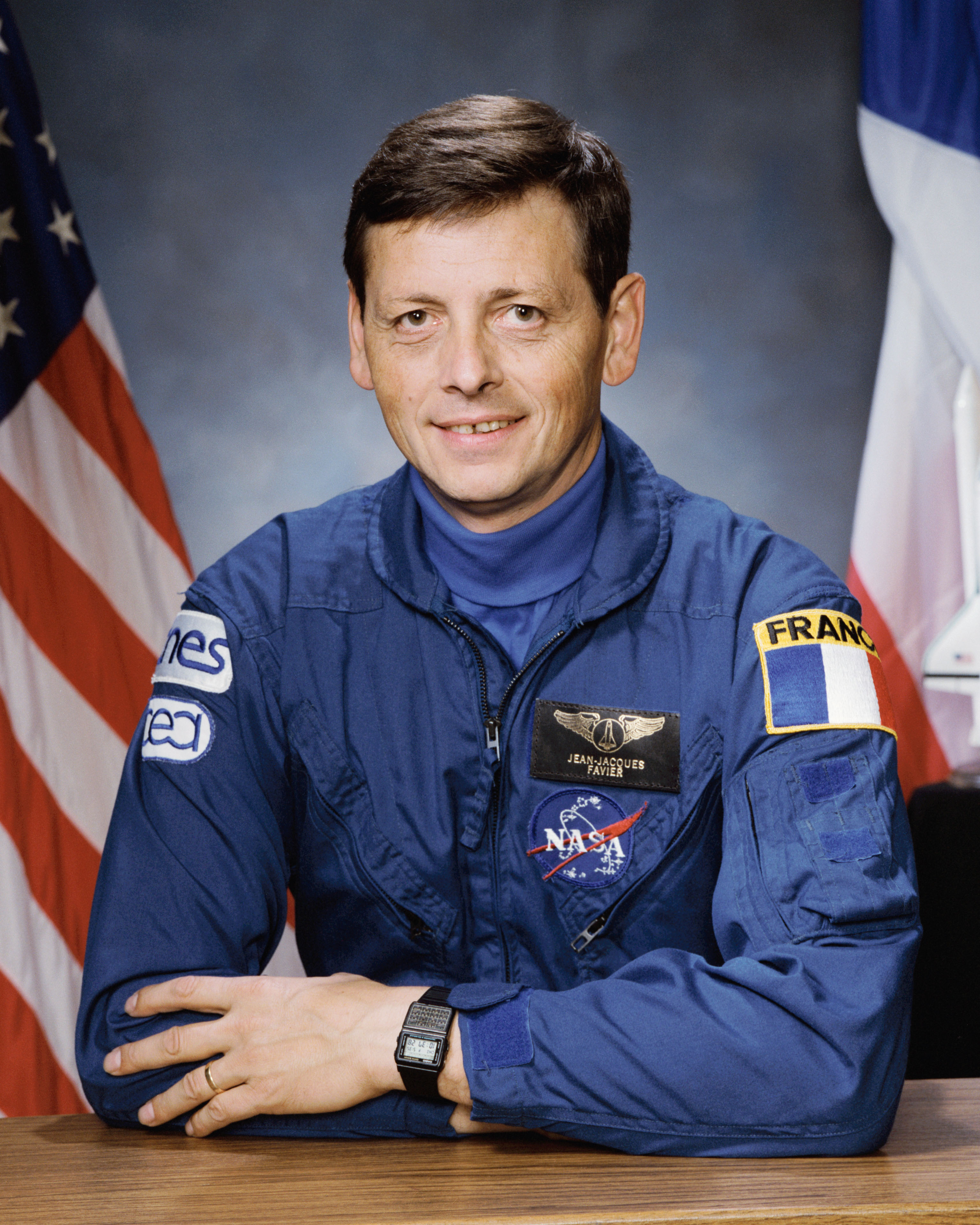
Jean-Jacques Favier, CNES Astronaut

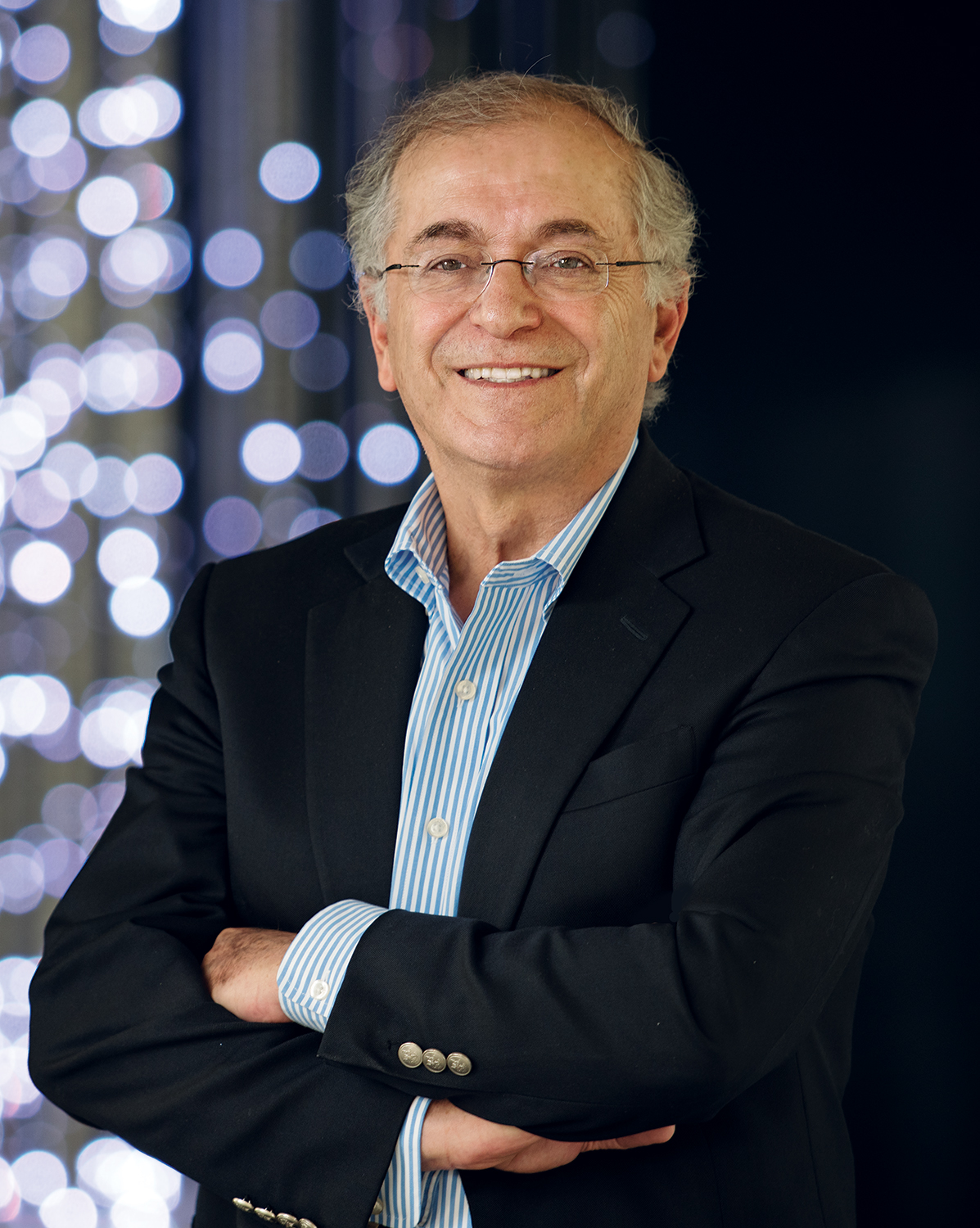
Charles Elachi, Director of the JPL

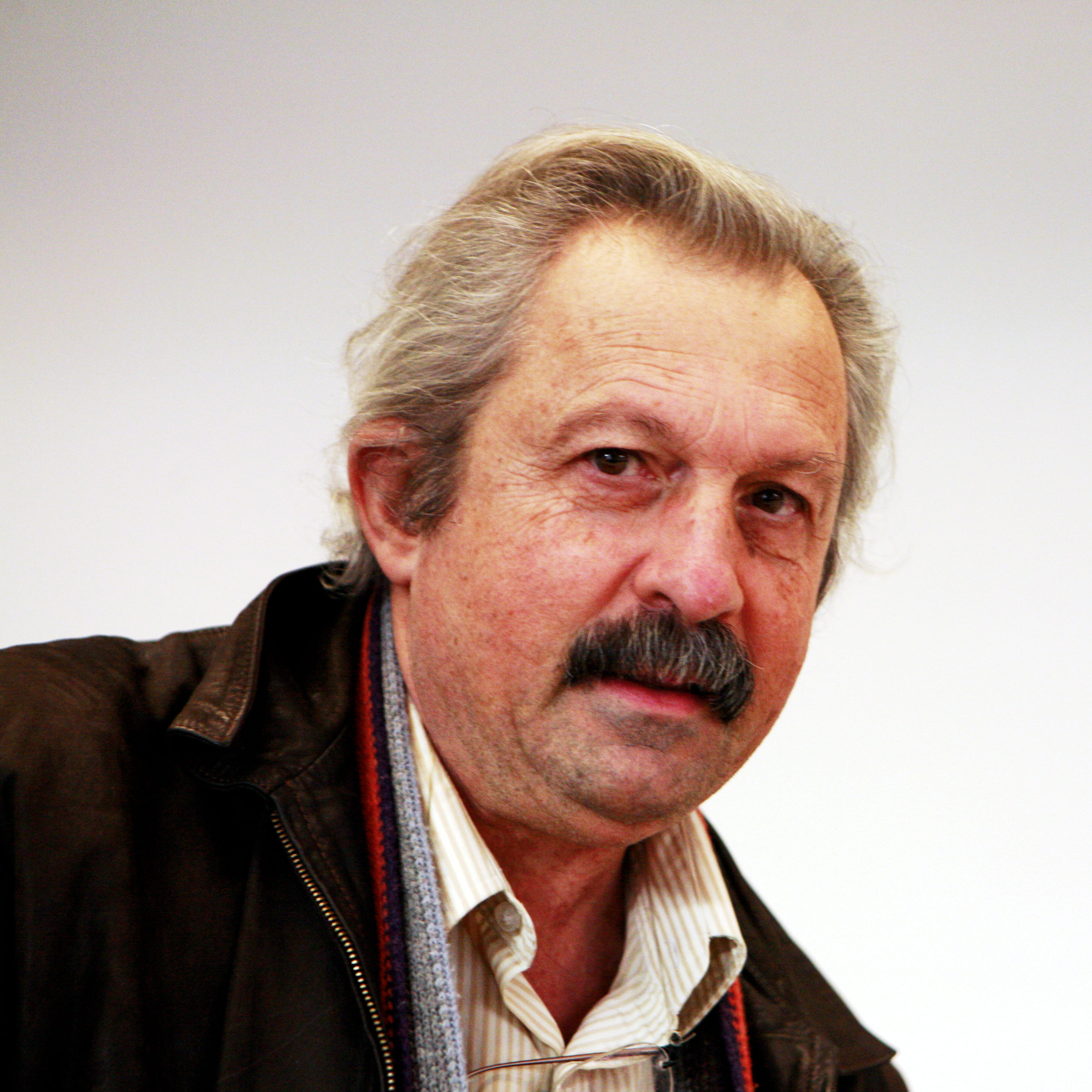
Joseph Sifakis, Computer scientist, Turing recipient

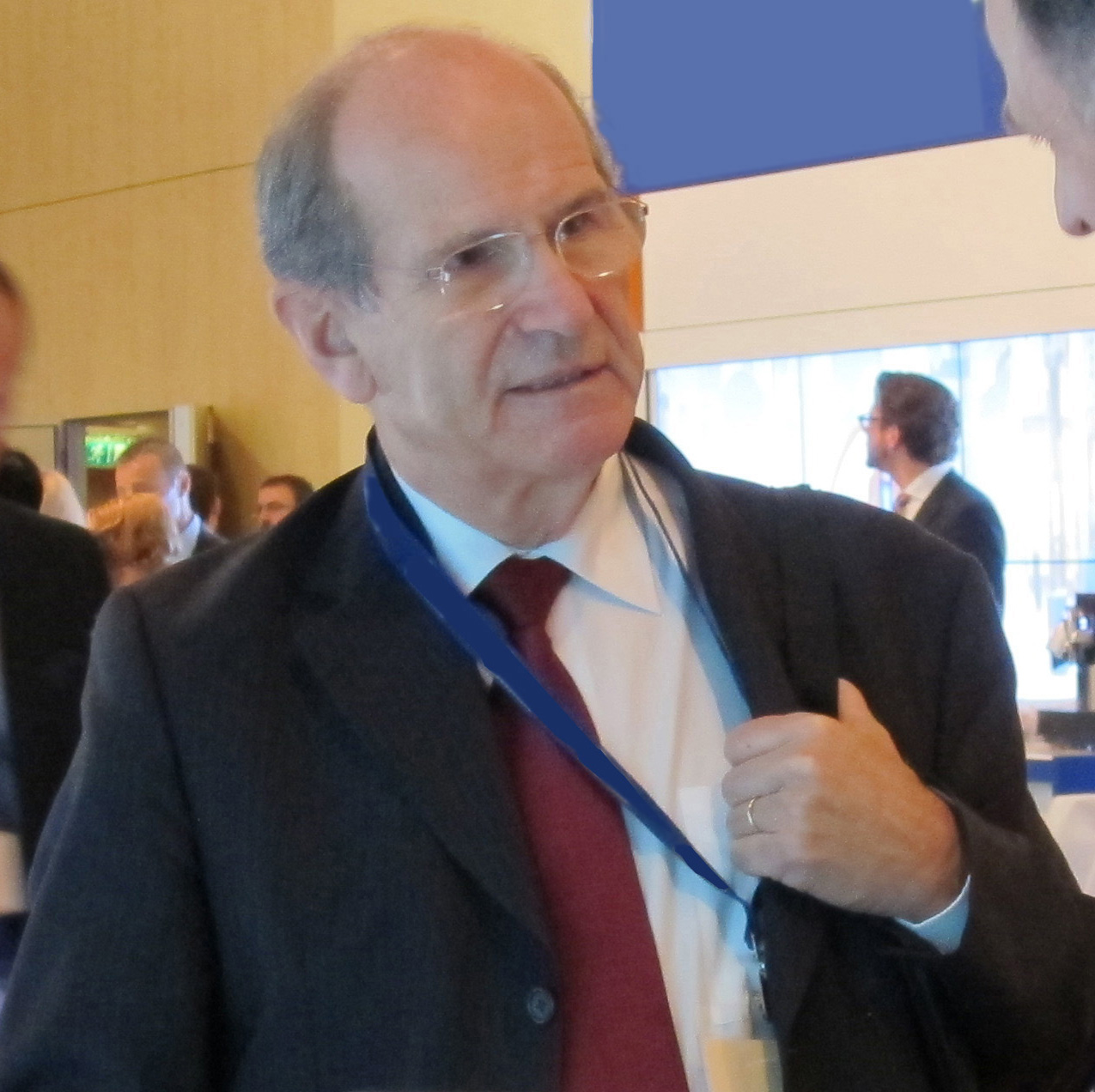
Alim Louis Benabid, Neurosurgeon

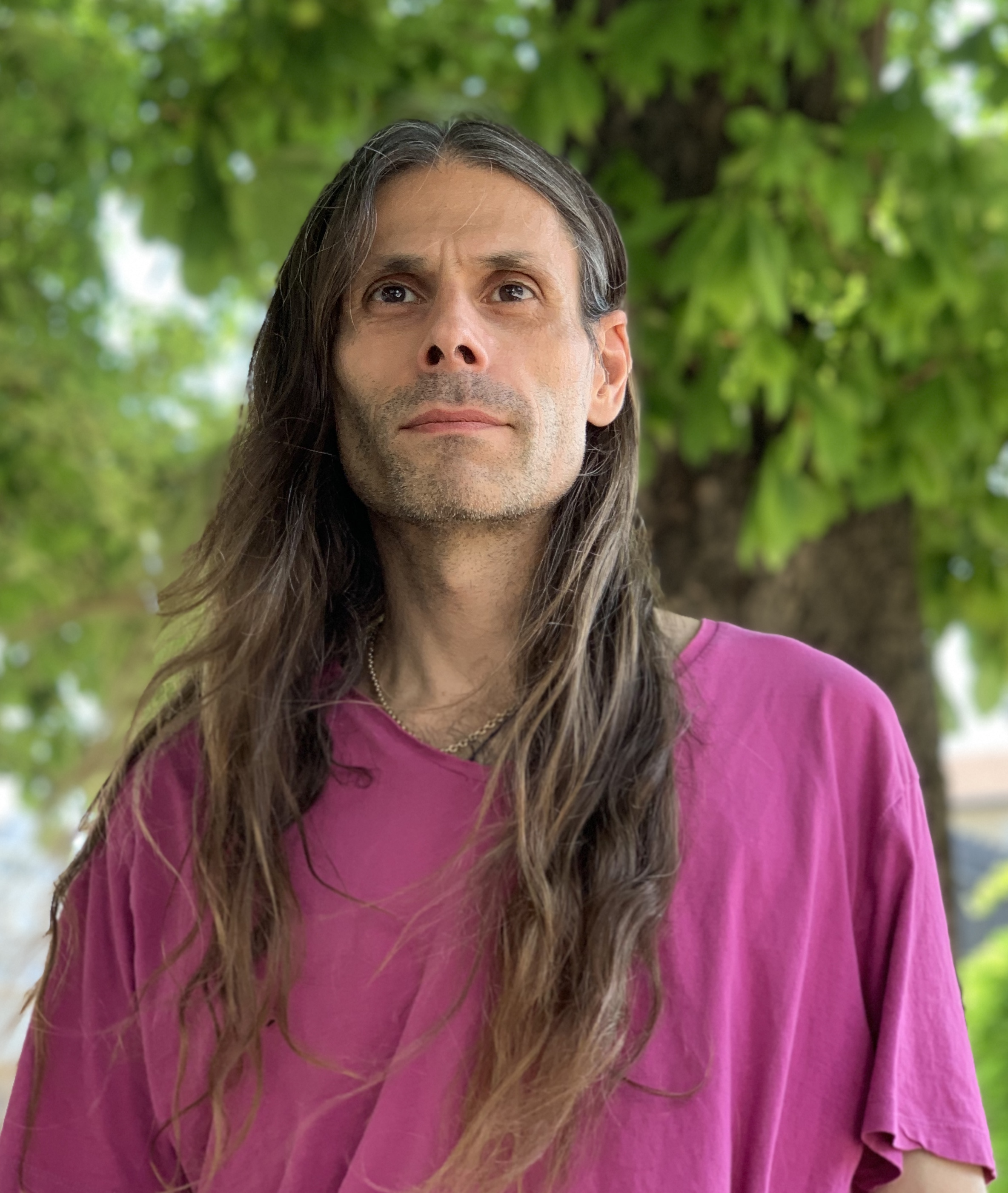
Aurélien Barrau, physicist and philosopher
