= Community Université Grenoble Alpes =

Association for universities in France

The Community Université Grenoble Alpes (French: Communauté Université Grenoble Alpes) is the association of universities and higher education institutions (ComUE) for institutions of higher education and research for Grenoble, Chambéry, Annecy and Valence in the Rhône-Alpes region of France.

The association was created as a ComUE according to the 2013 Law on Higher Education and Research (France), effective December 29, 2014. At the same time, the three Grenoble universities announced a plan to officially merge as of 1 January 2016.

== Members ==
Since January 1, 2016, Community Grenoble Alpes University consists of the following institutions:

- Université Grenoble Alpes
- Grenoble Institute of Technology
- Centre national de la recherche scientifique (CNRS)
- French Institute for Research in Computer Science and Automation (INRIA)

== Associates ==
- University Savoie Mont Blanc
- Grenoble Institute of Political Studies
- École nationale supérieure d'architecture de Grenoble
- Commissariat à l'énergie atomique et aux énergies alternatives
- Grenoble School of Management
