= École nationale supérieure de physique, électronique et matériaux =

French engineering college

Phelma
- Type: Grande école
- Established: 2008
- Affiliations: Grenoble Institute of Technology
- President: Alice Caplier
- Location: Grenoble, France; 45.195047°N 5.710149°E
- Campus: Minatec
- Colors: Red
- Mascot: Phoenix
- Website: phelma.grenoble-inp.fr

The École Nationale Supérieure de Physique, Électronique et Matériaux (commonly known as Phelma) is a Grande école located in Grenoble, France. Phelma is part of Grenoble Institute of Technology. The school specializes in physics, electronics and materials science.

The school is regularly ranked among the best in France in terms of engineering, Research, and Innovation, according to French magazines or International ones.

Students are admitted to Phelma after two years of undergraduate studies: the Classe préparatoire aux grandes écoles. Studies at Phelma are of three years' duration and lead to the French degree "Diplôme d'Ingénieur" (equivalent to a master's degree in engineering).

Based on physics, chemistry, processes, electronics, nanotechnologies, Phelma's teaching curriculum is of a great scientific and technical diversity with teaching themes and professional opportunities such as:

- Micro and nanotechnologies (microelectronics, nanosciences, materials, health)
- Energy (nuclear energy & energy, alternative energies)
- Information technology (digital communication, image and signal processing, telecommunications, computers and networks, embedded software, Internet of Things)
- Innovative materials (applied to transport, energy, leisure, health, microelectronics, building)
- Biotechnology (medical imaging and therapy, implantable devices)
- Environment (alternative energies, eco-processes, energy management, natural signal analysis)

== History ==
Phelma was born from the gathering of 3 engineering schools in 2008 : ENSEEG, ENSERG and ENSPG

- ENSEEG (Materials, Electrochemistry and Processes):
  ENSEEG was first known as the "Institut de l'Electrochimie" established in 1921. It was renamed ENSSEG in 1946.
- ENSERG (Electronics):
  The school was first part of the "Institut Polytechnique de Grenoble" in 1942. It became an ENSI in 1948. It was finally renamed ENSERG in 1968.
- ENSPG (Physics):
  The school was created in 1986 from a part of ENSIEG.

== Location ==
Due to its history, Phelma's building are located on 3 different places.

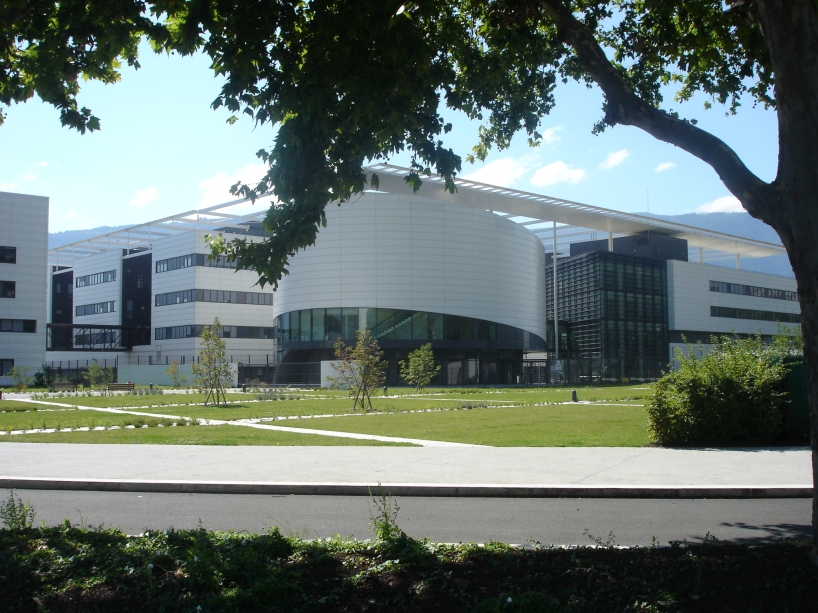
Minatec in August 2007

- The Minatec building located in Grenoble is the building of the ex-ENSPG and is a part of Minatec (Micro and Nanotechnology Innovation Centre)
- The Polygone building is located on the "Polygone Scientifique", where also can be found Minatec, CEA Grenoble and the ESRF. This is where the ENSERG was located.
- The Campus building is the ex-ENSEEG building. It is located on Grenoble Campus, which is outside of Grenoble in Saint-Martin-d'Hères.

== Curriculum ==
=== Engineering ===
The school recruits from the Concours Commun Polytechniques after the CPGE, or the Polytechnic Preparatory Cycle as well as from the dossier, at the bac + 2 level.

The school delivers an engineering degree and research masters.

==== First year ====
The students are grouped in first year in two courses with general vocation, giving a Bachelor in Engineering:

- PET: Physics, Electronics and Telecoms
- PMP: Physics, Materials and Processes

It is possible to choose any course in the second year regardless of the course followed in the first year.

In the end of the first year, a 1-month internship is compulsory in order to pass the year. This internship focuses on making the students have a genuine technical experience as a non-qualified worker to provide them with this knowledge, given that they may end up being manager in the future.

==== Second and third year ====
The courses of the second and third year grant a degree of Master of Science in Engineering, or "Diplôme d'Ingénieur".

There are National courses, which are mostly taught in French and International courses, taught in English and include an abroad period.

===== National =====
- EPEE: Electrochemistry and Processes for Energy and the Environment, dealing with sustainable development, alternative energies, deconstruction and waste reprocessing.
- SIM: Materials Science and Engineering, focused on Materials and Semiconductors.
- Biomedical Engineering: The Biomedical Engineering program brings to the student, on the one hand, general skills in physics and biology and, on the other hand, knowledge in the engineering sciences allowing him to place himself at the interface between physical phenomena. or biological and their applications. The courses are delivered in English.
- SEI: Integrated Electronic Systems, focused on embedded digital and analog microelectronics, systems-on-a-chip, microwave and radio frequency electronics, and optoelectronics.
- PNS: The Physics - Nanosciences course focuses on microelectronics, optical devices and telecommunications for scientific research.
- GEN: Energetic and nuclear engineering : based on the control of energy production systems, more specifically on nuclear energy, as well as on the safety of these systems.
- SICOM: Signal, Image, Communication, Multimedia (common with the Ense3) gives a triple skill in signal processing, electronics and IT.
- SEOC: Embedded systems and connected objects (shared with Ensimag). The sector trains the design, validation and operation of embedded systems and the implementation of software and hardware architectures with skills in network, real-time and embedded computing, and systems-on-a-chip.

===== International =====
- NANOTECH: International master's degree dedicated to micro and nanotechnologies, jointly with the Polytechnic University of Turin and the École Polytechnique Fédérale de Lausanne, with a limited number of places for the students of each Institution.
- FAME: International Degree in Functional Advanced Materials Engineering.
- AMIS: Advanced Materials for Innovation and Sustainability.

In the end of the 2^{d} year, a 3-4 month internship is compulsory to pass the year. This internship focuses on a first engineer experience, generally in a company or a research laboratory.

In the end of the 3rd year, a 6-month internship is compulsory to receive the "Diplôme d'Ingénieur". This is called the Projet de Fin d'Etudes (or "PFE"), and allows students to have a full-time experience to find a job after the graduation, or even to get a professional contract for the following years.

=== Research at Phelma ===
Phelma students have the opportunity to perform research work as part of their curriculum in third year (9th semester). 20% of Phelma graduates pursue a Ph.D.

The school offers research masters in collaboration with Grenoble Alpes University:

- Art, Science, Technology
- Cognitive science
- OR: Optics and radio frequencies
- Signal, Image, Speech Telecoms
- Nanoelectronics and nanotechnologies
- Electrochemistry and Processes (ElP)
- FAME: Functional Advanced Materials Engineering
- MaNuEn: Materials for Nuclear Engineering
- SGM: Materials Science and Engineering
- EMINE - KIC Innoenergy: European Master in Innovation in Nuclear Energy
- PHTUP: Processes of High Technologies Ultra Clean
- EP: Physical Energetics
- APP: Astrophysics, Plasmas, Planets
- PMCR: Condensed Matter Physics and Radiation
- PSC: Subatomic Physics and Cosmology
- Nanobiology, Nanobiotechnologies
- Nanochemistry and Nano-Objects
- Nanophysics, Nanostructures

== Rankings ==
=== 2013 ===
- L'Usine nouvelle: Grenoble Institute of Technology 2^{d} Best Engineering School of France.
- Industrie et Technologies: Grenoble Institute of Technology, 1st Engineering School in Innovation, and in Energy Engineering.
- QS World University Rankings: Grenoble Institute of Technology 1st Best Engineering School of France in 2 Fields: "Electrical Engineering" and "Electronics and Materials Science".
- L'Étudiant: Phelma 5th Best Engineering School of France on the criterion of "academic excellence".

=== 2014 ===
- L'Usine nouvelle: Grenoble Institute of Technology still 2^{d} Best Engineering School of France after Polytechnique.
- Industrie et Technologies: Grenoble Institute of Technology "Undisputed leader" in research; 1st for the 4th year in a row.
- QS World University Rankings: Grenoble Institute of Technology still 1st in the fields : "Electrical Engineering" and "Electronics and Materials Science".

=== 2015 ===
- L'Usine nouvelle: Grenoble Institute of Technology 2^{d} Best Engineering School of France, again.
- Industrie et Technologies : Grenoble Institute of Technology Best Engineering School of France in Innovation for the 4th time.
- L'Étudiant: Phelma 6th Best Engineering School of France on the criterion of "academic excellence".

=== 2016 ===
- L'Étudiant: Phelma progressed three places compared to the previous year by becoming the 3rd best school in France on the criterion of "academic excellence" and first in research.
- QS World University Rankings: Grenoble Institute of Technology still 1st en "Electrical Engineering" and 2^{d} in "Materials Science".

=== 2017 ===
- L'Étudiant: Phelma 5th Best Engineering School of France on the criterion of "academic excellence" and progresses by taking the 7th place on the criterion "international openness".

=== 2018 ===
- L'Étudiant: Phelma 4th Best Engineering School of France on the criterion of "academic excellence", being for the first time better ranked than École Centrale Paris or École des mines de Paris in particular.

== Student life ==
During the year, the life of Phelma's students is punctuated by many extracurricular activities such as student parties, welcoming new students, and many other very diverse activities that range from sporting events to cultural events. These activities are organized by several student associations:

- The Grand Cercle, or Cercle des élèves de Grenoble INP, organizing in particular the gala of Grenoble Institute of Technology.
- The Bureau des Élèves, or BDE, which organizes the reception and integration of new students and student nights throughout the year,
- The Bureau des Sports, BDS, which mainly organizes sports events such as ski trips,
- The Bureau des Arts, BDA, which organizes events related to the arts and to which are attached the cultural associations of the school: Club Zik, Club BD, Club Photo ...
- Junior Conseil Phelma, or JCP, which carries out technical projects for companies, and allows students to take part in professional missions providing them with experience during their studies.
- Team Gala Phelma who organizes the Phelma Gala, or Gala Horizon, an important school event with a buffet party...
- CHeer uP ! Phelma : National caritative association which helps children who suffer from cancer. This association isn't specific to Phelma.
- Le CLub Zik' : Mixing Association which animates students' parties in Grenoble.
- Phelma News : Newspaper of the School, which relates past and future events related to Phelma.
- Le Club Robotronik : Association which constructs robots and takes part in numerous robotic tournaments in France and Europe.
- Le Chalet : Association which manages some food, coffee and relaxation activities in the school.
- Phelma Gaming: Gaming association which relies on video games, with conferences, LAN sessions...

A lot of other associations related to Grenoble Institute of Technology also exist in Grenoble and are available to students from the 6 schools, such as INProd (video editing), Club Oenologie (Wine analysis), Cinétoile (Cinema specific)...

Some other associations are national or international associations which happen to be available in Grenoble or Phelma, such as CHeer uP !, BEST...

The BDE, the BDS and the BDA are elected each year by the students during the campaign, which takes place each year in February : a part of the first year students are grouped into several student lists that organize events during the campaign, in order to win the students' votes.

== See also ==
- Grenoble Institute of Technology
- Grenoble
- Grande école
- ENSE^{3}
- Polytechnic University of Turin
