= Economy of Rhône-Alpes =

The economy of Rhône-Alpes is the second most dynamic economy in France and the 6th region in Europe. The economy of this region based on three major cities, Lyon, Grenoble and Saint-Étienne.

== Agriculture, raw materials and energy ==
- Production of wine, including the AOC Beaujolais, Cotes-du-Rhône and Savoie,
- Cheese in mountain regions,
- Fruit in the Rhône Valley

The primary sector employs 4.9% of regional assets (France: 6.8%) for 3.5% of regional gross domestic product (GDP). It is a sector in decline, particularly in mountain areas, as it fails to provide farmers with sufficient incomes, since their incomes are below a quarter of the average national income. Nevertheless, the region remains a large agricultural region. This sector is divided evenly between crops and livestock. The latter is varied: Ain, the Alps and the Rhone raise 1.2 million cattle (ranked 7th nationally) and produce 15.5 million hectoliters of milk (ranked 5th nationally), in the Drome region and the ardeche region pigs and sheep are prominent, whilst the Bresse region is famous for its poultry. Crops produced in the Ain region and the left bank of the Rhone are mostly grain, including maize (700 000 tons, with a national ranking of 5th ). However, in the south (Drôme, Ardèche), fruit and vegetables are grown in the Rhone valley (the Valencia region in particular). The Rhône-Alpes is the largest producer of apricots and the second largest producer of peaches, raspberries, walnuts, cherries and tinned tomatoes. Milk and wine production are the second most important agricultural produce in the Rhône-Alpes . The Coteaux du Beaujolais (whose wine sales in the start of November is greatly influenced by the media) and the Côtes du Rhône provide 3.6 million hectoliters per year (see wines of Côtes du Rhône). These vineyards allow the Region to be the fourth largest producer of wine in France. AOC vineyard covers 42 454 ha and produces 2 347 hl per year, or 10% of national production. Minerals are exploited in Bois Noirs (uranium), Hauterive (salt), Hostun (kaolin), Bois Feuillet (fluorine) and Largentière (lead, zinc, silver).

There are hydro-electric plants on the river Isère (three plants), Arc (five plants), Drac and Romanche (two plants), Loire (two plants) and of course the Rhône (nine plants). A thermal power plant is located south of Lyon, and four nuclear power plants are located along the Rhône Saint-Vulbas (Bugey), Saint-Maurice, to Cruas and Pierrelate-Tricastin. Wind energy is also being developed in the Rhone Valley. All these electricity producing plants mentioned allow Rhône-Alpes to be the biggest electricity-producing region of France with 100 billion kilowatt hours, approximately 18% of total French production, despite the failure of the nuclear plant at Creys Malville.

== Agroprocessing ==
The region has many companies transforming the region's products (meats, cheese, meat cutting, biscuit ...) who may rely on research and development centers as Alimentec in Bourg-en-Bresse.

== Industries & Research ==
Grenoble is the second research center in France after Paris. Research centres in or near Grenoble include the European Synchrotron Radiation Facility (ESRF), the Institut Laue-Langevin (ILL), the European Molecular Biology Laboratory (EMBL), the Institut de radioastronomie millimétrique, one of the main research facilities of the Commissariat à l'Énergie Atomique (Nuclear Energy Commission, CEA), the French National Centre for Scientific Research (CNRS), the LNCMI and the European branch of Xerox Research. Leti in the Polygone Scientifique and the recent development of Clinatec and mostly Minatec, a centre for innovation in micro- and nano-technology, only increases Grenoble's position as a European scientific centre.

Mainly textile, mechanical, pharmaceutical and chemical, around Lyon, Saint-Étienne, in the Savoie and Ain. The industry compressors and pumps gas / vacuum is particularly well represented with more than 40% of national activity in this area [1]. The main applications are focused on the refrigeration / air conditioning, automotive, microelectronics, gas transportation and industrial processes. With companies such as Tecumseh, Danfoss and Alcatel Vacuum Technology sector contributes significantly to earnings in the region to export.

The refrigeration industry is also well represented by the designer as CIAT (Culoz), manufacturers of components Frigabohn (heat exchangers).

The city of Saint-Étienne possessed a center of research in the design important. Of the textile industry, once specialized in the tape emerged a medical textile activity.
