= Erwin-Félix Lewy-Bertaut =

French crystallographer and neutron scientist (1913-2003)

- Born: Erwin Lewy; February 9, 1913; Leobschütz, Germany
- Died: November 6, 2003 (aged 90); Grenoble, France
- Education: University of Freiburg; University of Breslau; University of Bordeaux; University of Grenoble
- Known for: magnetic crystallography granulometry neutron scattering
- Awards: Chevalier de la Légion d'honneur, Commandeur de l'Ordre national du mérite
- Scientific career
- Workplaces: CNRS; Institut Laue–Langevin
- Thesis: Etude aux rayons X des dimensions des domaines de Bragg dans les poudres polycristallines. Application à l'étude de la texture et structure de poudres de fer pyrophoriques et de leurs propriétés magnétiques (1953)
- Doctoral advisor: Louis Néel

Erwin-Félix Lewy-Bertaut (9 February 1913 – 6 November 2003), also known separately as Erwin Lewy, Félix Bertaut, and E. F. Bertaut, or Erwin Félix Lewy-Bertaut, was a German-born French materials scientist who led a former life as a law school student in Nazi Germany. He was renowned internationally for his work in magnetic crystallography, X-ray diffraction, and neutron scattering. He was a research director at CNRS, a member of the French Academy of Sciences and played an important role in the creation of Institut Laue–Langevin, a leading neutron research facility in the world.

== Biography ==
Lewy-Bertaut was born with the name Erwin Lewy to Jewish parents in Leobschütz of Silesia (then in Germany). The year 1930 marked a significant shift as his mother died, prompting their entire family's relocation to Gleiwitz amidst an era of economic turmoil and the ascent of Nazism. Following this, in 1931, Lewy embarked on his legal studies first at the University of Freiburg and subsequently in University of Breslau (now Wrocław). As Hitler's ascendancy to power unfurled in Germany, instituting a "numerus clausus" that effectively precluded Jewish individuals from university access, Lewy-Bertaut left for Bordeaux, France. There, the Rothschild Foundation awarded him a scholarship, facilitating his enrollment at the University of Bordeaux, where Lewy-Bertaut studied chemical engineering, physics, and mathematics. After graduation, Lewy-Bertaut undertook roles as a mathematics and German tutor and acquired French citizenship in 1936. In 1938, Lewy-Bertaut worked as an engineer at Institut du pin and joined the French army as a military volunteer near Bordeaux. At the onset of the conflict in 1940, Colonel Faure entrusted him with the military records of a missing soldier, Félix Bertaut, and he adopted this name permanently.

Lewy-Bertaut worked as a chemical engineer between 1941 and 1943 to enhance the durability of bicycle brakes crafted from agglomerated cork. To elude police inspections and evade mandatory labor service, he went to Paris, where he collaborated with Marcel Mathieu at the Laboratoire Central des Poudres. Subsequently, he partnered with Emmanuel Grison, who tutored him in the utilization of the International Tables for Crystallography. Regrettably, a bicycle registration check by the police led to his summons to the Paris Prefecture. Lewy-Bertaut moved to Grenoble in the Italian-occupied zone to meet Louis Néel, who was temporarily withdrawn from the University of Strasbourg and has founded the Laboratoire d'Electrostatique et de Physique du Métal (LEPM, now Institut Néel) in 1946, which was the first CNRS laboratory outside the Paris region. Lewy-Bertaut also took over Erwin Lewy's qualifications in 1946 and obtained a research grant from the CNRS under his wartime identity, "Félix Bertaut". Lewy-Bertaut eventually finished his thesis under Louis Néel in 1953 and André Guinier was also an examiner. His thesis involves X-ray diffraction studies of powder granulometry, which later became known as the Bertaut-Warren-Averbach method. Immediately after his thesis, Lewy-Bertaut started establishing his group at the LEPM that formed the basis of the X-ray department to carry out research in crystallography, along with Francis Forrat and Professor René Pauthenet, distinguished themselves with their work on garnet ferrites, from which the theory of antiferromagnetism and ferrimagnetism was built up.

In 1949, Lewy-Bertaut read a one-page publication by Clifford G. Shull and J. Samuel Smart, which recovered the magnetic structure of MnO from neutron diffraction and validated Louis Néel's work on antiferromagnetism. In 1953, Lewy-Bertaut secured a Fulbright grant to visit Raymond Pepinski's laboratory at State College, Pennsylvania and accessed the neutron diffraction facilities at the Brookhaven National Laboratory, where he acquainted himself with neutron experiments under the guidance of Lester Corliss and Julius Hastings. Upon returning to Grenoble, Lewy-Bertaut was placed in charge of the development of the military facility Polygone d'Artillerie (now Polygone Scientifique) into a neutron research center, which later became the Institut Laue-Langevin, an international research facility collaboratively funded by the French and German governmental agencies. Lewy-Bertaut was CNRS research director in 1956 and the scientific director of CNRS in 1961.

== Research ==
Lewy-Bertaut made an enormous contributions to magnetic and neutron crystallography, including the use of group theory in describing magnetic structures. When the International Union of Crystallography (IUCr) decided to finalize the volume on the symmetry of space groups in the International Tables of Crystallography, he was a member of the ad hoc committee and contributed in particular to the definition of magnetic groups. He used the symmetry of crystals to propose all possible magnetic structures. This "Bertaut method" was very useful for complex structures. Lewy-Bertaut also developed what is known as structure factor algebra and solved the structure of complex compounds such as the non-stoichiometric pyrrhotite.

== Honors and distinctions ==
Lewy-Bertaut was a member of the IUCr executive committee between 1975 and 1981. He was co-founder of its "Neutron Diffraction" commission and co-founder and chairman of its "International Tables" and "Charge, Spin and Momentum Density" commissions. He was the IUCr representative on the Solid State Commission of the International Union of Pure and Applied Physics (IUPAP) between 1966 and 1972 and was secretary and then chairman of the Solid State Physics Section. He was editor or co-editor of numerous scientific journals. From 1958 to 1982, he was scientific advisor to various institutes, including the Commissariat à l'Energie Atomique (CEA), CNRS, ILL, and the Max Planck Institute for Metal Research in Stuttgart.

Lewy-Bertaut received the CNRS Silver Medal in 1959. He received the Knight of the Legion of Honour and Commander of the National Order of Merit. In 1979, Lewy-Bertaut was elected a full member of the Académie des Sciences. In 1986, Lewy-Bertaut received the Gregori Aminoff Prize from the Royal Swedish Academy of Sciences.
