= Brigitte Plateau =

French computer scientist

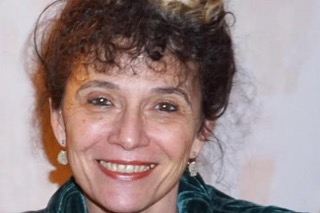
- Brigitte Plateau in 2020
- Education: University of Paris XI
- Occupations: computer scientist and university administrator

Brigitte Plateau is a French computer scientist. A former student of the École Normale Supérieure at Fontenay-aux-Roses majoring in Mathematics (option in Probability Theory), she is a Doctor of Information Studies. A university professor at Grenoble Institute of Technology (Grenoble INP) since 1988, since February 2012 she has been the general administrator of the Grenoble INP cluster.

Plateau is president of the AFDESRI (Association of Women Leaders of Higher Education, Research and Innovation) since September 2014 and Allistene (Alliance of the Digital Sciences and Technologies) since November 2014.

== Childhood ==
Born to a father who was an engineer and a mother who was a teacher, as a child of 7 or 8, Plateau enjoyed solving maths problems.

== Career ==
At the age of 18, Plateau had wanted to become a medical doctor, but her father advised against it. After studying at the École Normale Supérieure and Aggregation of Mathematics, Brigitte Plateau submitted in 1980 a postgraduate thesis (DEA) in computer science at the University of Paris XI and in 1984, a state computer thesis. She obtained a tenured research position^{(fr)} at the Centre national de la recherche scientifique (CNRS), then taught as a visiting scholar at the University of Maryland in the United States. In 1988, she was appointed full professor by Grenoble Polytechnic Institute, assigned to Ensimag and to the laboratory of Computer Engineering. In 1999, she created the IT and distribution Laboratory (Grenoble INP-UJF-CNRS) that she headed until 2004. In January 2007 Plateau created the Grenoble Informatics Laboratory associated with the French Institute for Research in Computer Science and Automation (INRIA). As of 2014, Plateau was in charge of 500 computer scientists at the laboratory. Her research work is on the performance of computer systems, in particular distributed and parallel systems. She is studying queueing models, distributed algorithms and massively parallel computers (by simulation and observation). She is an expert in high speed calculations using massive parallelism.

In 2010, Brigitte Plateau became director of the Ensimag school in Grenoble-INP. In February 2012, she was elected director of the group Grenoble-INP, the first woman to have this position. She was re-elected for a term of 4 years in February 2016.

In November 2014, she became president of the AFDESRI whose goal is to fight against the glass ceiling that affects women in the academic field. She also directs the Allistene, making her the first woman president of a research alliance.

She has participated in the national scientific bodies CNRS, ANR, INRIA, and the Ministry of Higher Education and Research (MESR).

== Awards and distinctions ==
- 2011: Knight of the Legion of Honour
- 2012: Grand Prize of the EADS Corporate Foundation (IT) of the French Academy of Sciences
- 2015: Officer of the National Order of Merit

== Selected publications ==
- Plateau, Brigitte. "On the stochastic structure of parallelism and synchronization models for distributed algorithms." ACM SIGMETRICS Performance Evaluation Review. Vol. 13. No. 2. ACM, 1985.
- Plateau, Brigitte, and Karim Atif. "Stochastic automata network of modeling parallel systems." Software Engineering, IEEE Transactions on 17.10 (1991): 1093-1108.
- Fernandes, Paulo, Brigitte Plateau, and William J. Stewart. "Efficient descriptor-vector multiplications in stochastic automata networks." Journal of the ACM 45.3 (1998): 381-414.
- Plateau, Brigitte, and Jean-Michel Fourneau. "A methodology for solving Markov models of parallel systems." Journal of parallel and distributed computing 12.4 (1991): 370-387.
- Baccelli, François, Erol Gelenbe, and Brigitte Plateau. "An end-to-end approach to the resequencing problem." Journal of the ACM 31.3 (1984): 474-485.
