= Clinatec =

Biomedical institute in France

- Established: 2011
- Field of research: Biomedical
- President: Alim Louis Benabid
- Director: Stéphan Charbades (medical director)
- Staff: 100
- Location: Grenoble, France; 45°11′33″N 5°42′29″E
- Affiliations: CEA, CHU Grenoble Alpes
- Website: http://www.clinatec.fr/en/

Grenoble

Clinatec is a biomedical research center based at the Polygone Scientifique in Grenoble. Doctors, biologists and micro- and nanotechnology experts work side by side at the 6,000 m^{2} facility. Around a hundred researchers and employees work at the center. When it opened at the end of 2011, it was hailed as the first center of its kind in the world. With six hospital rooms, cutting-edge medical imaging equipment and an operating suite, Clinatec was developed by the Research Division of the CEA (French Alternative Energies and Atomic Energy Commission), Grenoble-Alpes University Hospital (CHU), Inserm and the Université Grenoble Alpes. The primary focus is on cancer, neurodegenerative diseases and disability.

== Background ==
Professor Alim Louis Benabid and Jean Therme first met back in 2006.

Alim Louis Benabid is a neurosurgeon. Together with Professor Pierre Pollak, he developed a new treatment for Parkinson's disease, deep brain stimulation. His work received recognition in 2014 with the Lasker Award and in 2016 with the European Inventor Award.

Jean Therme is Director of Technological Research at CEA Grenoble. He has worked tirelessly to make Grenoble a key center of expertise in electronics and micro- and nanotechnology, and to encourage close collaboration between the worlds of research and industry.

Both men were convinced that millions of lives could be transformed by merging medical research and technology R&D. They agreed that the way to achieve this would be to bring together doctors, researchers, biologists, engineers, robotics engineers, mathematicians and knowledge engineers to work at a single site.

In 2010–11, the 6,000 m^{2} building was built and equipped.

In 2013, the first patient was admitted to the center, in relation to the "Protool" clinical trial coordinated by Professor Berger. For the first time, it was possible to use non-invasive procedures to explore regions of the brain that had hitherto been inaccessible. The exciting prospects opened up by this technology, the result of the coupling of technology developed at CEA-Leti with the clinical approach taken by researchers at Grenoble-Alpes University Hospital (CHU), Inserm and the Université Grenoble Alpes, led to setting up the MedPrint start-up, which won an I-lab award in 2015.

In 2014, Clinatec launched a campaign to raise 30 million euros in order to develop a number of projects, including:

- the Brain Computer Interface (BCI) project aiming to prove that a quadriplegic patient can drive neuroprosthetic effectors with multiple degrees of freedom, such as an exoskeleton, based on decoding cortical signals (ElectroCorticoGrams) measured by a Wimagine implant, and can do this through training to make the most of their cerebral plasticity,
- and the Near InfraRed (NIR) project aiming to demonstrate that near-infrared light can have neuro-protective effects in treating Parkinson's disease.

== Founding Members ==
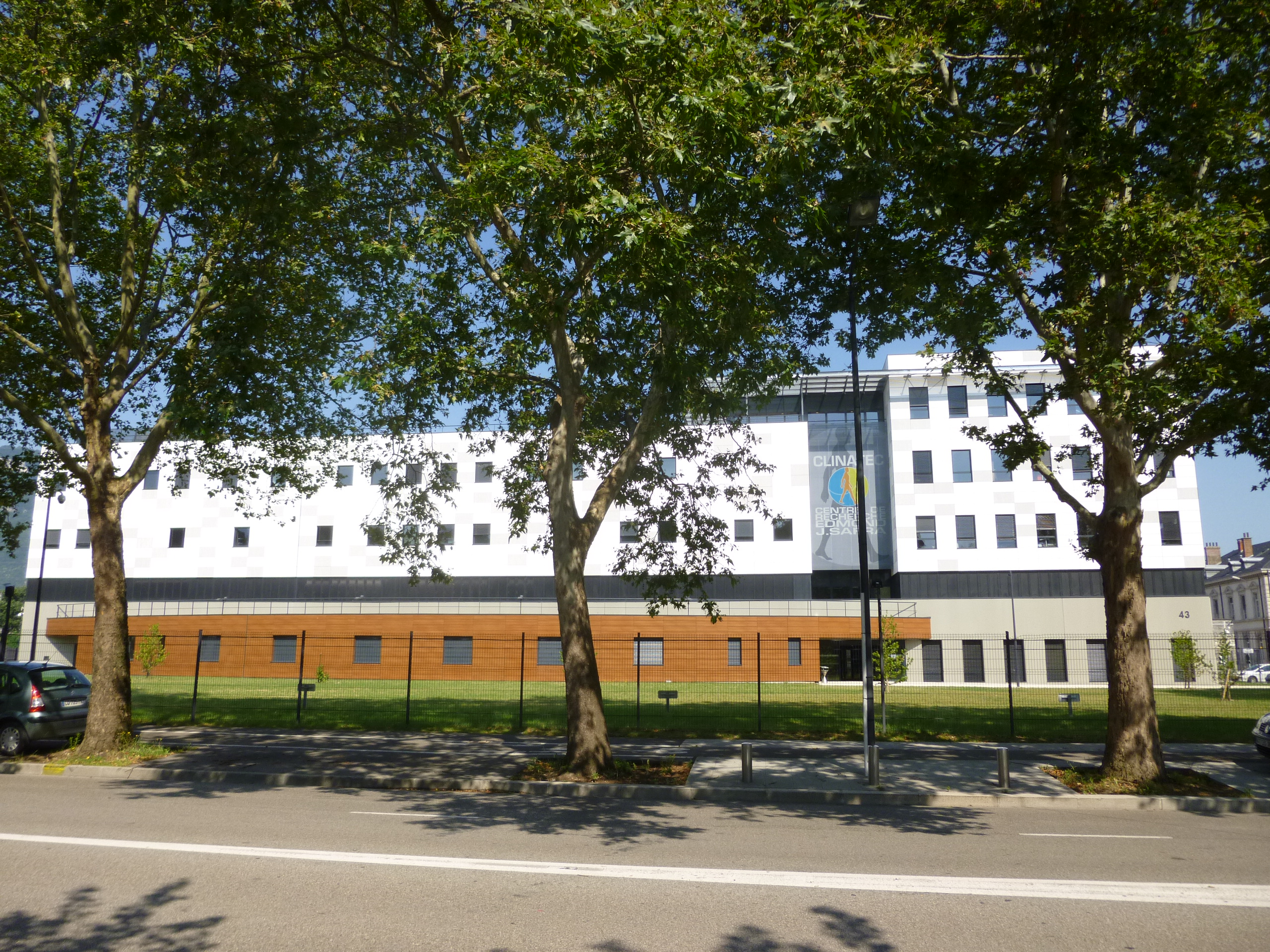
Clinatec

Clinatec is the outcome of a solid partnership between the CEA (French Alternative Energies and Atomic Energy Commission), Grenoble-Alpes University Hospital (CHU), Inserm and the Université Grenoble Alpes.

== The clinatec endowment fund ==
The Clinatec endowment fund was set up in 2014. A sponsorship campaign has been launched, aiming to raise 30 million euros by 2018.

== Awards ==
=== Lasker Award ===
Professor Alim Louis Benabid, Clinatec's founder and chairman of the board, member of the French Academy of Sciences, is one of the joint winners of the prestigious Albert-Lasker Award for clinical research awarded by the Albert and Mary Lasker Foundation in New York. Professors Alim-Louis Benabid and Mahlon R. Delong of Emory University received awards for their contributions to the development of deep brain stimulation. The technique consists in stimulating the subthalamic nucleus to inhibit tremors and restore motor function in patients with Parkinson's disease and from complications caused by Levodopa, a drug widely used in treating the disease.

=== Breakthrough Prize in Life Sciences ===
Set up in 2013 by Mark Zuckerberg and Priscilla Chan of Facebook, Sergey Brin, founder of Google, and Yuri Milner and Anne Wojcicki, the founders of 23andMe, the Breakthrough Prize in Life Sciences is awarded to researchers whose work extends human life expectancy. Professor Alim Louis Benabid was awarded the prize in 2015 for the development of deep brain stimulation, a technique which has revolutionized the treatment of Parkinson's disease.

=== European Inventor Award 2016 ===
On June 9, 2016, Professor Alim Louis Benabid received the European Inventor Award 2016 for his work on deep brain stimulation. The technique, now used all over the world, has radically transformed the lives of more than 150,000 people with Parkinson's disease, and significantly improved their quality of life.

== Media interest ==
In July 2012, Philippe Pozzo di Borgo, rendered quadriplegic following an accident and the man whose story was the inspiration for the French film Intouchables, visited Clinatec with a group of local journalists. He expressed his confidence in and admiration for this research program in a report aired on regional news channel, France 3 Alpes

== See also ==
- Brain computer interface
- Minatec
