= Fredo Durand =

American computer scientist

Fredo Durand is a computer scientist at the Massachusetts Institute of Technology’s Computer Science and Artificial Intelligence Laboratory (CSAIL), where he helps lead CSAIL's Computer Graphics Group.

He works on both computer graphics and vision, spanning topics such as computational photography, differentiable rendering, compilers for high-performance imaging, and video magnification.

Several of his projects focus on trying to reveal visual signals that are otherwise imperceptible to the human eye. With MIT colleagues he developed a “motion microphone” device that can take silent video of an object and magnify the visual vibrations from the video to recreate the sounds present in the room. He also helped develop a system that can look at short video clips of people sitting still and visually magnify their movement and skin-color changes such that he could measure people's heart-rates, enabling new applications for remote health monitoring.

Another project uses video of shadows on the floor to be able to detect things hidden around the corner. His team's “Interactive Dynamic Video” system lets them test how an object would respond to different kinds of touch based only on a short video clip of it.

He has also created several tools for computer graphics. With Saman Amarasinghe and Jonathan Ragan-Kelley he invented a domain-specific language (DSL) called Halide for image processing. Their research showed that Halide offers speed and performance gains over hand-engineered code, and uses code that is also easier to read. Halide has received interest from both academic and industry partners, who have incorporated it into products such as the Google Pixel's cameras, Adobe's Photoshop filters and YouTube's video-uploading system.

Durand received his PhD in 1999 from Grenoble Institute of Technology in France, supervised by Claude Puech and George Drettakis.

He co-organized the first Symposium on Computational Photography and Video in 2005, and the first International Conference on Computational Photography in 2009.

Durand received an inaugural Eurographics Young Researcher Award in 2004, an NSF CAREER award in 2005, an inaugural Microsoft Research New Faculty Fellowship in 2005, a Sloan fellowship in 2006, a Spira award for distinguished teaching in 2007, and the ACM SIGGRAPH Computer Graphics Achievement Award in 2016.
