= Joseph Sifakis =

Greek-French computer scientist

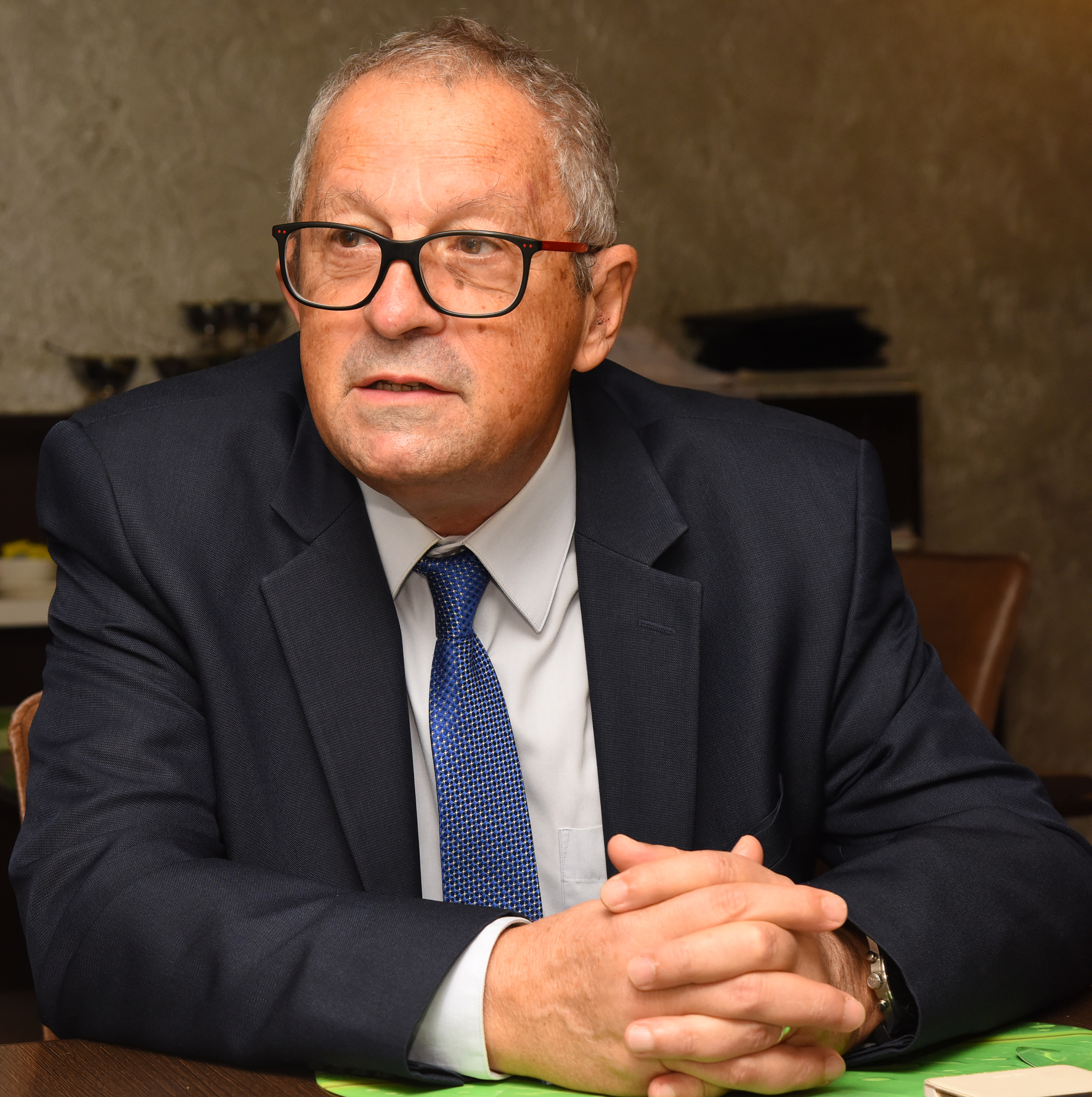
- Born: 26 December 1946 (age 79); Heraklion, Crete, Greece
- Education: National Technical University of Athens (BS); University of Grenoble (MS, PhD)
- Known for: Model checking
- Spouse: Olga Ioannidi
- Awards: Turing Award (2007); Leonardo da Vinci Medal (2012)
- Scientific career
- Fields: Computer science
- Workplaces: CNRS; École Polytechnique Fédérale de Lausanne
- Notable students: Stavros Tripakis, Susanne Graf, Sergio Yovine, Ahmed Bouajjani

Joseph Sifakis (Greek: Ιωσήφ Σηφάκης; born 26 December 1946) is a Greek-French computer scientist. He received the 2007 Turing Award, along with Edmund M. Clarke and E. Allen Emerson, for his work on model checking.

== Biography ==
Joseph Sifakis was born in Heraklion, Crete in 1946 and lives in France. He studied Electrical Engineering at the National Technical University of Athens and Computer Science at the University of Grenoble under a French scholarship. He received his engineering doctorate in 1974 from the University of Grenoble, where he also received a state doctorate in 1979.

He is currently Research Director Emeritus for the Centre national de la recherche scientifique at VERIMAG laboratory near Grenoble, of which he is the founder. Sifakis has been a leading figure in the fields of Model Checking and Embedded Systems. He founded with Edmund M. Clarke and Amir Pnueli the CAV conference, organized for the first time in Grenoble in 1989. He has been the coordinator of the ARTIST European Network of Excellence for research on Embedded Systems (2004–2012).

Sifakis held the INRIA-Schneider endowed industrial chair (2008–2011) and has been a full professor and the Director of the «Rigorous System Design Laboratory » at the School of Computer and Communication Sciences of EPFL (2011–2016). He has been visiting professor at Tsinghua University (2011–2012), and at SUSTech (2019).

Sifakis has been the President of the Greek National Council for Research and Technology (2014–2016).

== Work ==
Sifakis worked on system verification and the application of formal methods to system design. In his state doctorate he studied the principles of the algorithmic verification method known later as model checking. In 1982, this technique was applied in Jean-Pierre Queille's PhD to develop the CESAR verification tool.

Sifakis was the director of VERIMAG for fourteen years. Established initially as a mixed industrial laboratory between CNRS and Verilog SA., VERIMAG has collaborated with Airbus and Schneider Electric to develop methods and tools for the development of safety critical systems, in particular the SCADE synchronous programming environment based on the Lustre Language. Sifakis has worked on the verification of timed and hybrid systems with Thomas Henzinger and the synthesis of timed systems with Amir Pnueli and Oded Maler. He has participated to the development of verification tools including the IF toolset, Kronos, CADP, and TGV and has developed theory for coping with state explosion using abstraction techniques.

Over the past twenty years, his work has focused on rigorous component-based design using the BIP component framework and more recently the design of trustworthy autonomous systems, self-driving cars in particular. He is the author of the book Understanding and Changing the World, published by Springer in May 2022.

== Awards and honors ==
- Turing Award, 2007
- Leonardo da Vinci Medal, 2012
- Grand Officer of the National Order of Merit, France, 2008
- Member of the French Academy of Engineering, 2008
- Commander of the Legion of Honor, France, 2011
- Member of the French Academy of Sciences, 2010
- Member of Academia Europaea, 2008
- Member of the American Academy of Arts and Sciences, 2015
- Member of the National Academy of Engineering, 2017
- Foreign member of the Chinese Academy of Sciences, 2019
- Member of the National Academy of Sciences, 2024
