= Alim Louis Benabid =

French neurosurgeon (born 1942)

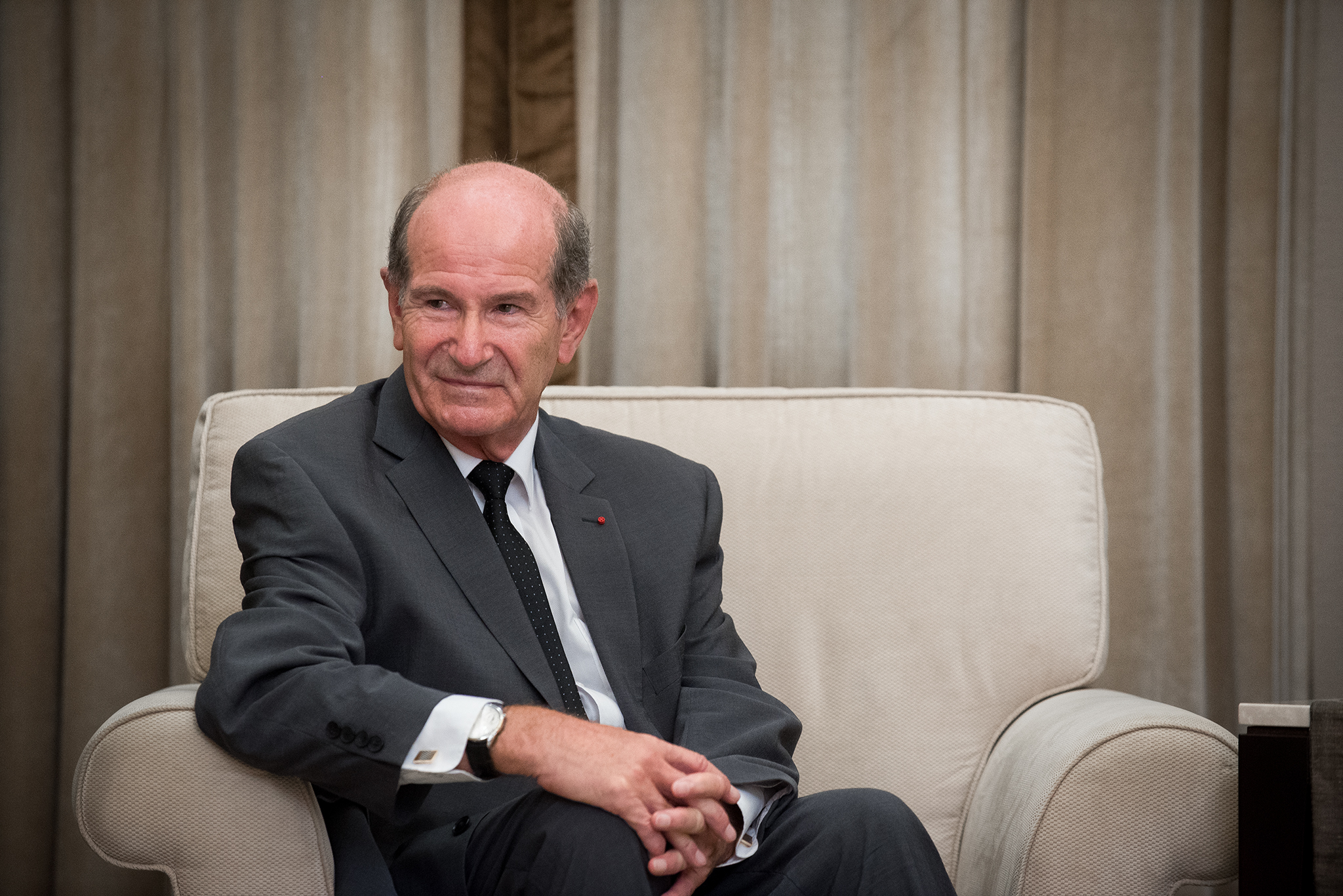
- Benabid in 2017
- Born: May 2, 1942 (age 84); Grenoble, France
- Education: Joseph Fourier University
- Occupations: Neurosurgeon, researcher
- Writing career
- Subjects: Medicine, physics

Alim Louis Benabid is a French-Algerian emeritus professor, neurosurgeon and member of the French Academy of Sciences, who has had a global impact in the development of deep brain stimulation for Parkinson's disease and other movement disorders. He became emeritus professor of biophysics at the Joseph Fourier University in Grenoble in September 2007, and chairman of the board of the Edmond J. Safra Biomedical Research Center in 2009 at Clinatec, a multidisciplinary institute he co-founded in Grenoble that applies nanotechnologies to neurosciences.

== Biography ==
Alim Louis Benabid was born May 2, 1942, in Grenoble, France. The son of a doctor from Algeria and of a French nurse, Benabid was quoted as saying he could not easily decide between studying physics or medicine. He received his medical degree in 1970 and a doctorate in physics in 1978, both from Joseph Fourier University (now part of the Université Grenoble Alpes) in Grenoble. He became a staff neurosurgeon at Joseph Fourier University in 1972, professor of experimental medicine in 1978, and professor of biophysics from 1983 to 2007. Benabid also had a fellowship in 1979 – 1980 in preclinical neuropharmacology in the laboratory of Floyd Bloom at the Salk Institute in La Jolla, California. From 1988 to 2007, he directed the preclinical neurosciences unit at the French biomedical and public health research institution INSERM, and from 1989 to 2007, served as head of the neurosurgery department at the University Hospital of Grenoble. In other roles, Benabid coordinated the Claudio Munari Center for Surgery of Epilepsy and Movement Disorders at Ospedale (Hospital) Niguarda in Milan, Italy from 1998 to 2007, and was a staff consultant at the Cleveland Clinic Foundation in Ohio from 2000 to 2003.

In 2007, Benabid joined the French Commissariat d'Energie Atomique as a scientific adviser during the time a campus for public-private innovation was being created, the Grenoble Innovation for Advanced New Technologies campus, which includes the Minatec research complex and the life-science cluster NanoBio. In 2009, he became chairman of the board of the Edmond J. Safra Biomedical Research Center at Clinatec, a translational biomedical technology organization he helped found within Minatec. Clinatec was jointly created by CEA-LETI (Laboratoire d'électronique des technologies de l'information—an applied micro- and nanotechnology subsidiary of CEA), Grenoble University Hospital, INSERM and Joseph Fourier University. In 2013, when awarding Benabid a $100,000 Robert A. Pritzker Prize for Leadership in Parkinson's Research to fund continued research, the Michael J. Fox Foundation said in its award announcement that Benabid had published 523 scientific papers, achieving an H Index of 67, as well as given 18 honorary lectures, and received 23 medals and prizes.

== Deep brain stimulation neurosurgery ==
Benabid along with Pierre Pollak, a neurologist at the University Hospital of Grenoble, also developed deep brain stimulation in 1987 for the treatment of Parkinson's disease.

Parkinson's disease is commonly treated with medicines such as levodopa to improve muscle control, balance and walking, but higher dosages tend to be needed over time in this progressive neurological condition, and long-term use can lead to motor fluctuations such as tremor, rigidity or slowness.

Prior to development of deep brain stimulation, the main surgical treatment for Parkinson's disease was lesioning to inhibit involuntary abnormal motion associated with severe Parkinson's disease not controlled by optimal medication. Electrical stimulation was used during surgery to stun the area of intended surgical ablation prior to its removal to predict lesioning effects. To precisely locate the right area, an electrode would be placed around the target to stimulate surrounding tissue with physiological frequencies of 20 – 50 Hz and observing the individual's response.

What they noticed was that electrical stimulation itself reduced tremor during the procedure, leading Benabid to reason that chronic stimulation could be a more nuanced and modifiable alternative to the irreversible ablation that had been historically done for such patients. He tested from very low frequencies of 1, 5, 10 Hz and more up to 100 Hz, mimicking the effects of ablation without destroying tissue. Initially he tested the thalamus, but switched to the subthalamic nucleus based on animal studies. As batteries and surgical technology advanced to allow such stimulation to be continuously applied for a long time, deep brain stimulation became widely adopted in the 1990s for treatment of movement disorders such as Parkinson's disease, essential tremor, and dystonia.

A meta-analysis of six randomized controlled trials published in 2014 showed that in 1,184 study subjects, deep brain stimulation significantly improved untreated motor symptoms of Parkinson's disease, permitting a reduction in medication doses and their associated complications; as well as contributing moderately, during the phase when the patients were taking Parkinson's disease medication, to fewer motor symptoms, greater function, and better quality of life.

== Cancer research ==
Outside of his work with deep brain stimulation, Benabid also researched stereotactic surgery methods for brain surgery in patients who had brain tumors or certain types of movement disorders. As part of the work, he and his team members created tissue banks using tissue from brain tumor biopsies. The tissue samples were used to characterize brain tumors by oncogenic mapping. His work on genomics and proteomics helped led to advances in cancer therapy such as anti-angiogenic factors.

== Honors and awards ==
Benabid has received a number of awards and honors from various countries, including:

- Dehomag prize for robotics (1993)
- Prix Électricité-Santé de l'EDF (1994)
- Medicine and biology prize of the Comité du rayonnement français (1997)
- Biomedical PCL research prize of the French Academy of Sciences (1998)
- Scientific prize from the National Foundation for Health Promotion and Research Development (Algeria, 1999)
- Jean Valade Prize of the Foundation of France (1999)
- Member of the Institut Universitaire de France (1999)
- Klaus Joachim Zülch Prize of the Gertrud Reemtsma Foundation (Cologne, 2000)
- Scientific Award 2000 of the International Neurobionics Foundation (Hanover, 2000)
- Cotzias Award of the Spanish Society of Neurology (Barcelona, 2000)
- Sherrington Medal of the Royal Society of Medicine (London, 2002)
- Research and Health Prize of l'Institut des sciences et de la santé (2002)
- Betty and David Koetser Foundation Prize (Zurich, 2002)
- Dingebauer Prize of the German Neurological Society (2002)
- Member of the Royal Academy of Medicine of Belgium (2002)
- Spiegel and Wycis Medal (2005)
- Matmut Prize for medical innovation, the Foundation of the Future (2006)
- James Parkinson Award (2007)
- Victor Horsley Award (2007)
- American Academy of Neurology's Movement Disorders Research Award (2008)
- Honor Award from INSERM (2008)
- Victory of Medicine (2008) under the Jubilee Hospital, with Dr. Pierre Pollak
- Robert A. Pritzker Prize for Leadership in Parkinson's Research (2013)
- Jay Van Andel Award for Outstanding Achievement in Parkinson's Disease Research (2013)
- Honorary member of the Belgian Society of Neurology
- Knight (Chevalier) of the Ordre des Palmes Académiques
- Knight (Chevalier) of the Legion of Honor
- Lasker Award (2014)
- Breakthrough Prize in Life Sciences (2015)
- European Inventor Award for the category Research (2016)
- Doctor honoris causa on the occasion of the KU Leuven Patron Saint's Day (2018)
- Queen Elizabeth Prize for Engineering (2026)

=== Honorary degrees ===
- Honorary degree, National University of Ireland, Galway (2005)
- Honorary degree, University of Western Ontario, London, Canada
- Honorary degree, McGill University, Montreal, Canada

== See also ==
- Stereotactic surgery
