= Xu Caidong =

Xu Caidong 徐采栋
- Born: 27 March 1919; Fengxin, Jiangxi, China
- Died: 14 April 2016 (aged 97); Beijing, China
- Education: Southwest Jiaotong University; ENSEEG
- Scientific career
- Fields: Physical chemistry of metallurgy
- Workplaces: Guizhou University

Xu Caidong (simplified Chinese: 徐采栋; traditional Chinese: 徐采棟; 27 March 1919 – 14 April 2016) was a Chinese metallurgist, politician, and academician of the Chinese Academy of Sciences (CAS).

== Biography ==
Xu was born in Fengxin County, Jiangxi. He graduated from Tangshan Engineering College, Chiao Tung University in 1943. He went to France in 1946 and obtained a doctor's degree from École Nationale Supérieure d'Électrochimie et d'Électrométallurgie de Grenoble (ENSEEG) in 1949. After returning to China, he joined the faculty of the Guizhou University School of Engineering in the same year. He joined the Jiusan Society in 1956.

Xu's research was mainly focused on the physical chemistry of metallurgy. He operated the blast furnace for smelting mercury, the industrial synthesis of potassium permanganate by the electrolytical method, and the industrial synthesis of calcium-magnesium phosphate in the shaft furnace.

Xu was elected an academician of the Chinese Academy of Sciences in 1980. He became the vice-governor of Guizhou Province in 1983. He was elected as the executive vice chairman of the central committee of the Jiusan Society in 1990. He was appointed president of Guizhou University in 1997 when Guizhou Agricultural College, the Guizhou Institute of Arts, and the Guizhou Agricultural Cadre-Training School merged into Guizhou University.

Xu died on 14 April 2016 in Beijing at the age of 97.
