= Avik Bhattacharya =

Microwave remote sensing specialist

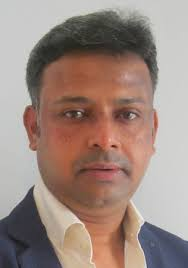
- Born: Kharagpur, West Bengal, India
- Citizenship: India
- Education: Indian Institute of Technology Kharagpur; Télécom ParisTech, France; INRIA Sophia Antipolis, France
- Known for: Synthetic Aperture Radar (SAR); Radar Polarimetry; Bio and Geophysical Parameter Estimation
- Scientific career
- Fields: Radar remote sensing
- Workplaces: Indian Institute of Technology Bombay; Canadian Centre for Remote Sensing
- Doctoral advisor: Henri Maître; Josiane Zerubia
- Website: http://www.mrslab.in/Avik/

Avik Bhattacharya (born 1976) is a professor at the Centre of Studies in Resources Engineering, Indian Institute of Technology Bombay, Mumbai, India. He has been working in the field of radar polarimetry theory and applications for more than a decade. His main focuses on the use of synthetic aperture radar (SAR) data for land use classification, change detection and qualitative and quantitative biophysical and geophysical information estimation.

== Education ==
Bhattacharya received his M.Sc. degree in mathematics from Indian Institute of Technology Kharagpur, West Bengal, India, in 2000, and the Ph.D. degree in Indexing of Satellite Images Using Structural Information from jointly at the Department of Traitement et Interprétation des Images, Télécom Paris-Tech, Paris, France and INRIA, ARIANA Project Group, Sophia Antipolis, France in 2007.

== Professional career ==
Bhattacharya joined the Centre of Studies in Resources Engineering, Indian Institute of Technology Bombay, in 2011, as an assistant professor. He has been the principal and co-principal investigator of numerous projects sponsored by the Department of Science and Technology (DST), Defense Research and Development Organization (DRDO), Indian Space Research Organization (ISRO) and GEOGLAM-JECAM SAR Inter-Comparison Experiment. He has authored several scientific publications in refereed international journals and conference proceedings

Bhattacharya was the editor-in-chief of the IEEE Geoscience and Remote Sensing Letters (GRSL) (2019-2024). He is also the founding chairperson of the IEEE Geoscience and Remote Sensing Society (GRSS) Chapter, Bombay section, India.

Bhattacharya has also served as a visiting professor at the following institutes:

- LISTIC – Polytech Annecy-Chambéry, Université Savoie-Mont Blanc, France (2018)
- Instituto Gulich, National University of Córdoba, Argentina Space Agency (CONAE), Argentina, (2018)
- Visiting Scientist at the Canadian Centre for Remote Sensing Ottawa, ON, Canada (2011)

== Major research contributions ==
- Stochastic Distance Based Y4O Polarimetric SAR Decomposition (SDY4O)

This is a radar polarimetric decomposition technique based on the field of statistical information theory. Here a method is devised to estimate the polarization (OA) orientation angle from the full polarimetric SAR data using the Hellinger distance.

- Adaptive General Four-Component Scattering Power Decomposition

In this method, one out of the two types of complex special unitary transformation matrices is identified and chosen to transform a unitary rotated coherency matrix in real space based on the greatest value of degree of polarization (DOP) commonly termed as adaptive general four-component scattering power decomposition method (AG4U).

- Sen4Rice – A cloud-based SAR processing pipeline with Google Earth Engine

Here a framework for monitoring and mapping of rice fields especially from rice cultivation regions of India using time-series of Sentinel-1 data is developed using the Google Earth Engine's cloud computing platform.

=== Other research ===
Other significant research includes development of various methods like relative de-correlation Measure in Polarimetric SAR decomposition, decomposition algorithm development consisting (S-Ω) and Modified (m-χ) and crop monitoring using machine learning. In past, Prof. Bhattacharya was also actively involved in study related to snow dynamics in Himalayas involving SAR data from satellites like RADARSAT-2.

== Honors and awards ==
- Fellow, National Academy of Sciences, India (2026)
- IEEE Geoscience and Remote Sensing Society Regional Leader Award (2024)
- Australian Government Endeavor Executive Fellowship Award (2016)
- Young Faculty Award, Indian Institute of Technology Bombay (2011)
- Visiting Scientist Fellowship at the Canada Centre for Remote Sensing under Canadian National Laboratories (2008)

== See also ==
- Polarimetry
- Synthetic Aperture Radar
- Remote sensing
- Interferometric SAR
- Satellite crop monitoring
- Remote sensing (geology)

== Selected bibliography ==
=== Articles ===
- Bhogapurapu, Narayanarao; Dey, Subhadip; Bhattacharya, Avik; Mandal, Dipankar; Lopez-Sanchez, JM; McNairn, Heather; Lopez-Martinez, Carlos; Rao, Y.S. (August 2021). "Dual-polarimetric descriptors from Sentinel-1 GRD SAR data for crop growth assessment". ISPRS Journal of Photogrammetry and Remote Sensing. 178: 20–35. Bibcode:2021JPRS..178...20B. doi:10.1016/j.isprsjprs.2021.05.013. hdl:10045/115962. S2CID 236594150.
- Kumar, Vineet; Mandal, Dipankar; Bhattacharya, Avik; Rao, Y.S. (June 2020). "Crop characterization using an improved scattering power decomposition technique for compact polarimetric SAR data". International Journal of Applied Earth Observation and Geoinformation. 88 102052. Bibcode:2020IJAEO..8802052K. doi:10.1016/j.jag.2020.102052.
- Ratha, Debanshu; Pottier, Eric; Bhattacharya, Avik; Frery, Alejandro C. (May 2020). "A PolSAR Scattering Power Factorization Framework and Novel Roll-Invariant Parameter-Based Unsupervised Classification Scheme Using a Geodesic Distance". IEEE Transactions on Geoscience and Remote Sensing. 58 (5): 3509–3525. arXiv:1906.11577. Bibcode:2020ITGRS..58.3509R. doi:10.1109/TGRS.2019.2957514. S2CID 195700216.
- De, Shaunak; Bruzzone, Lorenzo; Bhattacharya, Avik; Bovolo, Francesca; Chaudhuri, Subhasis (January 2018). "A Novel Technique Based on Deep Learning and a Synthetic Target Database for Classification of Urban Areas in PolSAR Data". IEEE Journal of Selected Topics in Applied Earth Observations and Remote Sensing. 11 (1): 154–170. Bibcode:2018IJSTA..11..154D. doi:10.1109/JSTARS.2017.2752282. S2CID 29626919.
- Muhuri, Arnab; Manickam, Surendar; Bhattacharya, Avik (July 2017). "Scattering Mechanism Based Snow Cover Mapping Using RADARSAT-2 C-Band Polarimetric SAR Data". IEEE Journal of Selected Topics in Applied Earth Observations and Remote Sensing. 10 (7): 3213–3224. Bibcode:2017IJSTA..10.3213M. doi:10.1109/JSTARS.2017.2681719. S2CID 23560686.

=== Books ===
- Mandal, Dipankar; Bhattacharya, Avik; Rao, Yalamanchili Subrahmanyeswara (2021). Radar Remote Sensing for Crop Biophysical Parameter Estimation. Singapore: Springer Nature. pp. XVIII, 236. ISBN 978-981-16-4423-8.
