= Patricia Limousin =

French neurologist

Patricia Limousin is a French neurologist recognized for her contributions to the treatment of movement disorders, particularly through deep brain stimulation (DBS). She earned her medical degree from the University of Grenoble and completed her PhD in neuroscience at the University of Lyon I in 1998, focusing on DBS of the subthalamic nucleus as a treatment for Parkinson's disease.

Limousin was part of the pioneering team in Grenoble, France, led by Professors Alim-Louis Benabid and Pierre Pollak, where modern DBS techniques for movement disorders were developed. In fact, she was the first neurologist to switch on bilateral deep brain stimulation to the subthalamic nucleus, leading to marked improvements of Parkinson's Disease, with a treatment that has now been applied in over 200,000 patients, world-wide. In 1997, she joined the UCL Institute of Neurology and the National Hospital for Neurology & Neurosurgery in London, where she currently serves as a professor of clinical neurology and honorary consultant neurologist.

Her research focuses on the application of DBS in treating conditions such as Parkinson's disease, dystonia, and tremor. She has extensively studied the effects of DBS on speech and the mechanisms underlying its therapeutic benefits. Limousin is also involved in developing new surgical therapies for movement disorders, including exploring novel targets and participating in gene and cell therapy trials.

== See also ==
- Deep Brain Stimulation
