= École nationale supérieure de l'énergie, l'eau et l'environnement =

Engineering school in Grenoble, France

Grenoble INP - ENSE³, UGA^{3}
- Type: Grande École; Public University
- Established: 2008
- Affiliations: Conférence des grandes écoles
- Students: 931
- Location: Grenoble, France; 45.193126°N 5.765644°E
- Campus: Grenoble Cedex 1
- Mascot: Polar Bear
- Website: http://ense3.grenoble-inp.fr/

The École nationale supérieure de l'énergie, l'eau et l'environnement (Grenoble INP - Ense^{3}, UGA) (Graduate School of sustainable engineering for Energy, Water and Environment) is one of the engineering schools of the Institut National Polytechnique de Grenoble. As a grande école, students are admitted through a nationwide competitive examination. It was formed by the merger of the École nationale supérieure d'hydraulique et de mécanique de Grenoble (ENSHM) (National Superior School of Hydraulics and Mechanics of Grenoble) and the École nationale supérieure d'ingénieurs électriciens de Grenoble (ENSIEG) (National Superior School of Electrical Engineers of Grenoble).

== History ==
ENSIEG was created in 1908 to provide training for industrial electricians. ENSHM was later founded in 1929 to satisfy the demands of the local industries in Grenoble for graduating engineers in fluid mechanics and hydroelectricity. The two schools merged to establish Ense^{3} in 2008. Their merger occurred during the overhaul of the Grenoble Institute of Technology (Grenoble INP, Institut Polytechnique de Grenoble, Groupe Grenoble INP and before that INPG).

During President Sarkozy's Plan campus, the Ense^{3} radically changed residence from the Ampère (formerly belonging to ENSIEG) and Bergès (formerly of the ENSHMG) campuses to the West campus.

== Academics ==
The school provides engineering training in the fields of energy (production, transport, distribution and management, and information processing), water (hydraulics, hydrology, civil engineering) and environment (renewable energies, energy efficiency, geotechnical, soil pollution, and environmental water quality). An engineering degree is awarded after completion of training.

Student recruitment is either through competitive polytechnic examinations or dedicated polytechnic preparatory schools that usually last for two years. Evidence of earlier degrees obtained from other universities could also serve as a foundation for admission.

The school offers training in the following specialties: multimedia signal and image communication systems, energy systems and energy markets, hydraulic structures and environments, electric power engineering, mechanical energy, energy engineering and nuclear engineering, automatic systems and information, and product engineering.

Degrees awarded at the Grenoble INP - Ense^{3} are equivalent to a Master's degree. Some of the programs are:

- Electrical Power Engineering
- Mechanical & Energy Engineering
- Engineering of Nuclear Power
- Energy systems and associated markets
- Hydraulics, Civil & Environmental Engineering
- Automatic control, Systems and Information technology
- Signal & Image Processing, Communication Systems & Multimedia
- Product Design

Three programs that are mainly taught in English, according to the school's website, are:

- Master Hydraulics, Civil and Environmental Engineering (HCEE)
- Master Electrical Engineering for Smart Grids and Buildings (SGB)
- Master Fluid Mechanics and Energetics (FME)
- Master Mobile, Autonomous and Robotic Systems (MARS)

== Research and industrial relations ==
=== Research laboratories ===
The research led teaching staff of the school work in the following laboratories:

- 3S-R (Soils, Solids, Structures - Risks)
- GIPSA-lab (Laboratory of Signal Processing, image and automatic)
- G2Elab (Laboratory of Electrical Engineering and Power Electronics)
- G-SCOP (Science for product design, optimization and management)
- LEGI (Laboratory of Geophysical and Industrial Flows)
- LEPMI (Laboratory of Electrochemistry and Physical Chemistry of Materials and Interfaces)
- LTHE (Laboratory of Hydrology and Environment Transfers)
- Rheologie Lab (material and runoff)
- SIMAP (Science and Engineering Materials and Processes)

=== Competitiveness cluster ===
The Tenerrdis Center, located on the school premises, was designed to develop energies for the future. It is focused on platforms of technology, de-localized energy production, and energy savings in the home, as well as electronics, signal and image processing.

== See also ==
- Grenoble Institute of Technology
- École nationale supérieure de physique, électronique et matériaux (Phelma)
- ENSIMAG
- ISF/Engineers Without Borders
