= Nobu Tamura =

Japanese American paleoartist and physicist

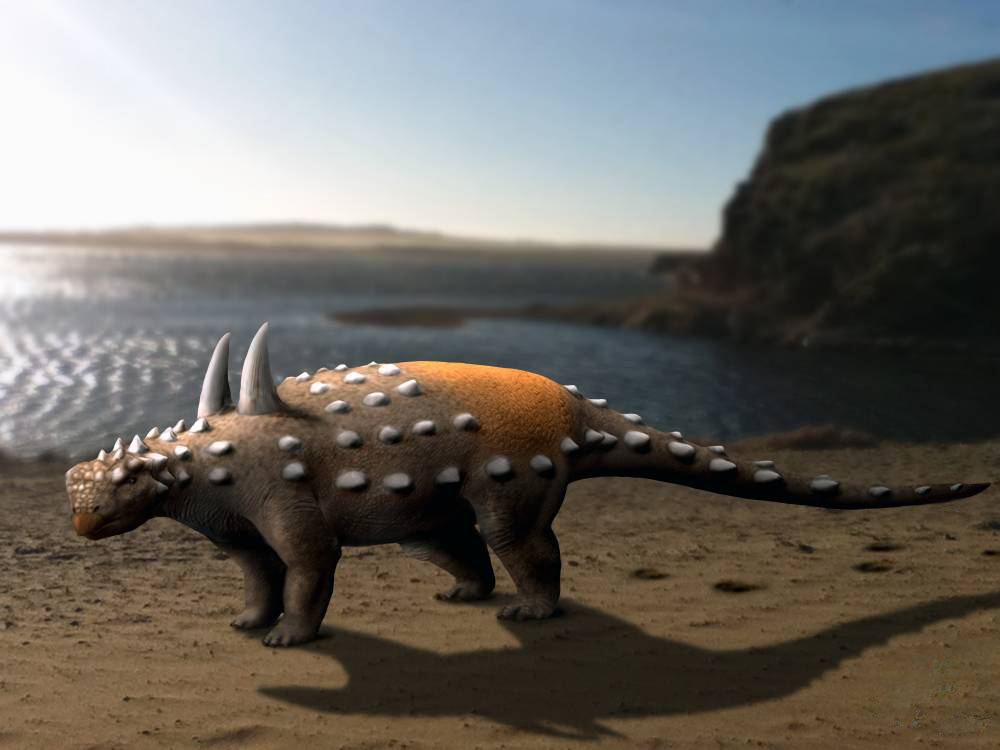
An example of his paleoart (Aletopelta coombsi)

Nobumichi Tamura, often shortened to Nobu Tamura, is a French-born Japanese American paleoartist and physicist. He currently lives in California, United States.

== Biography ==
Tamura became a physicist with Lawrence Berkeley National Laboratory (LBNL) and is an artist specializing in the field of paleoart.

Tamura was a student at Grenoble Institute of Technology from 1986-1989 for electrochemistry, and then from 1989 until 1993 for his PhD in Materials Science. He worked at Oak Ridge National Laboratory from May 1998 to August 1999, and then moved to LBNL. He has worked there ever since as the project leader for the development of the ALS X-Ray microdiffraction beamline. He is a Senior Scientist in Diffraction and Imaging, and Photon Science Operations. He has published over 300 articles, including in publications such as the Journal of Structural Biology and the Proceedings of SPIE, which focus on research into utilizing microdiffraction of soft x-rays to measure stress, among other things.

In addition to his work in the field of optics, he also has an extensive portfolio of paleoart. He has illustrated two books: Dinosaurs of the British Isles and Vertebrate Evolution: From Origins to Dinosaurs and Beyond. In an interview in 2016 he estimated that he's published over 1,500 drawings since 2007, and continues to release new content on his Spinops. According to Tamura, he was inspired to begin making paleoart while browsing through Wikipedia when he noticed that the dinosaur pages did not have any illustrations. He told Inverse in 2016 that he remembers thinking "Maybe I can do something about it." In PBS Eons' video "An Illustrated History of Dinosaurs," he is listed as a prominent figure in the newest age of paleoart.
