= École nationale supérieure d'électronique et de radioélectricité de Grenoble =

Educational institution in Grenoble, France

ENSERG
- Type: Grande Ecole
- Established: 1958
- Director: Bernard Guérin
- Administrative staff: 56
- Students: 400
- Address: 3, Parvis Louis Néel - BP 257 - 38016 Grenoble Cedex 1, Grenoble, Rhône-Alpes, France; 45.1957°N 5.7099°E
- Campus: Urban
- Mascot: Serge
- Website: www.enserg.fr

The École Nationale Supérieure d'Électronique et de Radioélectricité de Grenoble, or ENSERG, was a grande école located in Grenoble, France. ENSERG was part of the Institut National Polytechnique de Grenoble, also called INPG. Its activity was transferred in 2008 in the new school Phelma.

== Research ==
5 research labs were attached to the ENSERG:

- ICP : Institut de la Communication Parlée (Institute for Spoken Communication).
- IMEP : Institut de Microélectronique, Electromagnétisme et Photonique (Institute for Microelectronics, Electromagnetism and Photonics).
- LIS : Laboratoire des Images et des Signaux (Picture and Signal Laboratory).
- CLIPS : Communication Langagière et Intéractions Personne-Systèmes (Language Communication and Human-System Interaction).
- TIMA : Technique de l'Informatique, de la Microélectronique pour l'Architecture des ordinateurs (Technics of Computer Science, Microelectronics for Computer Architecture).
