= École nationale supérieure d'ingénieurs des systèmes avancés et réseaux =

Engineering college in Grenoble, France

Coordinates: 44°55′02″N 4°54′49″E

The École Nationale Supérieure d'Ingénieurs des Systèmes Avancés et Réseaux (Esisar) is an engineering school of the Grenoble Institute of Technology.

== Higher Institute of Engineering in Advanced Systems and Networks ==
Grenoble Institute of Technology INPG has nine schools, of which Esisar is the most recent. Each year it confers 1000 degrees in engineering, 300 Master's degrees as well as 200 PhD theses. It has 31 research laboratories which are associated with the CNRS (the French National Scientific Research Centre).

Esisar opened in 1995, in a response to business demands. It educates engineers who are seeking master the challenge of putting advanced systems into operation, in the fields of electronics, automation and industrial information technology. Advanced Systems allows more rapid creation of new products (analysis & design), manufacturing at a lower cost while ensuring good quality (by regulation and a constant supervision of the processes), also working on 'smart' items and innovative functions.

Esisar was founded in collaboration with Grenoble University of Technology (INPG), the leading French centre for the training of engineers, and of the CCI for the Drôme region.

The teaching method in Esisar combines classic teachings of an engineering school with a practical approach to address the realities of the industrial world. It is the only school that offers fourth year students the opportunity to complete an industrial project, carried out for a client company which defines the content. The INPG/ESISAR engineering diploma was entitled and certified by the National Commission in November 1994.

== First and second years ==
During their first two years, students study electronics, automation and computer science. In addition, early apprenticeship of industrial skills (accountancy, marketing, project management, etc.) is provided, which continues for five years. Mathematics and physics are taught from the first to the fourth year.

== Third year ==
Esisar proposes a multi-disciplinary apprenticeship. Electronics, automation, industrial computing and all industrial equipment are taught this year. For the students who join the school in the third year, their cycle starts off with six weeks of class on technical disciplines, while the students who joined in the first year are on technical training.

== Fourth year ==
In fourth year, all student-engineers may participate in a six-month industrial project organised in teams of three and supported by a study supervisor. This project, commissioned by a client company, is based on a feasibility study, a model or a prototype. It contributes to the creation of a product or a new function, with industrial stakes which are also imposed on the student-engineers. Some projects have led to real successful products.

== Fifth year ==
After following a common programme, the student engineers choose between two "in depth" modules. The ISE module - embedded computer science, is oriented towards software aspects of advanced systems. The ISD module - command and integration of the systems and devices, is oriented towards the material aspects. Conferences led by industrialists and researchers allow students to benefit from high level coaching on the "state of the art" in their future field of activity. The year ends with a six-month industrial project.
