= Cyril Abiteboul =

French motor racing engineer and manager (born 1977)

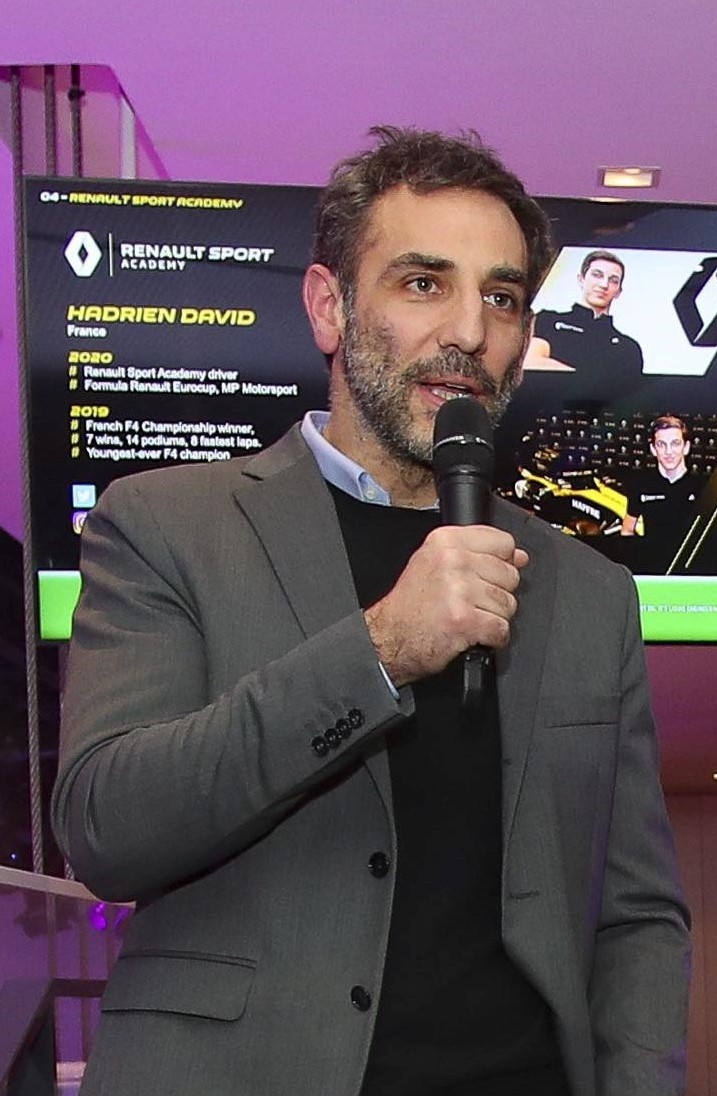
- Abiteboul in 2020
- Born: Cyril François Roger Abiteboul; 14 October 1977 (age 49); Paris, France
- Education: Engineer, Grenoble ENSEEG
- Occupations: Motorsport Advisor; Managing Director; Team Principal
- Years active: 2001–present
- Employer(s): Hyundai Motorsport (2023–present); Mecachrome (2021–2022); Renault F1 Team (2014–2020); Caterham F1 (2013–2014)

Cyril François Roger Abiteboul (born 14 October 1977) is a French auto racing engineer and manager. He has served as the team principal of Hyundai Motorsport since 2023. From 2013 to 2014 he was the team principal of Caterham Formula One team, and was the managing director of the Renault F1 Team from 2014 to 2020.

== Early and personal life ==
Abiteboul was educated at the Lycée Carnot and Lycée Chaptal high schools in Paris, and went on to study multidisciplinary engineering at Grenoble Institute of Technology.

Abiteboul has one tattoo, as a result of a lost bet with Daniel Ricciardo, where he would get a tattoo if Ricciardo was able to achieve a podium finish, which he did, finishing third in the 2020 Eifel Grand Prix. It is a vintage Renault logo on his right calf with a stylized honey badger, Ricciardo's personal mascot.

== Career ==
After graduating in 2001, Abiteboul joined Renault at Boulogne-Billancourt, looking after the Renault F1 website. He was made Business Development Manager for the Renault F1 team in 2007 and went on to become executive director of Renault Sport F1 in 2010.

Abiteboul joined Caterham F1 Team in September 2012. He had previously worked with team partner Renault, where he was Deputy Managing Director of Renault Sport F1. On 8 November 2012, Abiteboul was appointed as team principal of Caterham, taking the place of Tony Fernandes.

In July 2014, after Abiteboul's departure from Caterham had been announced, Renault confirmed his return as managing director of Renault Sport F1. He left Renault as the racing team rebranded to Alpine in 2021.

In May 2021, Abiteboul joined Formula 2 engine supplier Mecachrome as their motorsport advisor.

Abiteboul joined Hyundai World Rally Team as team principal in 2023. He was appointed as the president of Hyundai Motorsport at the end of the year.
