= Laboratoire d'Informatique de Grenoble =

Computer science research laboratory in Grenoble

Coordinates: 45°11′37″N 5°46′10″E

- Founders: National Center for Scientific Research, INRIA, Grenoble INP, Université Grenoble-Alpes
- Established: 2007
- Mission: Computer science
- director: Éric Gaussier
- Faculty: 189
- Address: 700 Avenue centrale, 38400 Saint-Martin-d'Hères
- Location: France
- Website: http://www.liglab.fr

The Laboratoire d'Informatique de Grenoble (LIG, Grenoble Computer Science Laboratory) is the largest research laboratory of Informatics in Grenoble, France. It was created 1 January 2007, as the result of a union of the 24 research teams of the previous IMAG Institute and the INRIA Rhône-Alpes.

The scientific project of the LIG is "ambient and sustainable IT". The goal is to leverage the complementary nature and recognised quality of the 23 research teams of the LIG to contribute to fundamental aspects of the discipline (modelling, languages, methods, algorithms) and to create a synergy between the conceptual, technological and societal challenges that surround this theme.

The Grenoble Informatics Laboratory (Laboratoire d’Informatique de Grenoble - LIG) is a laboratory of quite some scale, the academic partners being:

The CNRS, Grenoble INP, Inria Grenoble Rhône-Alpes, the Université Joseph Fourier, the Université Pierre-Mendès-France, the Université Stendhal.

The LIG is formed by about 500 people:
- 41% of PhD students,
- 26% of teacher-researchers,
- 14% of post-doc, invited, contracts,
- 10% of full-time researchers,
- 9% of administrative and technical staff.

== History ==
The LIG is under the joint supervision of the université Grenoble-Alpes, the Institut polytechnique de Grenoble, and the CNRS. It is a partner of the INRIA.

Under the impetus of Brigitte Plateau, this laboratory is the result of the amalgamation of five former laboratories of the Institute of Computer Science and Applied Mathematics of Grenoble of Grenoble-Rhône-Alpes. In 2016, the laboratory, moved from Rue de la Piscine to the IMAG building on Avenue Centrale, by the Laboratoire Jean-Kuntzmann and the VERIMAG laboratory.

== Research Domains ==
LIG research covers a very large range of domains in Informatics. Topics includes for instance Software Engineering, Formal Methods, Multimedia, Natural Language Processing, Databases, Knowledge representation, Geographic Information Systems Virtual reality, Multi-agent systems, Distributed systems, Information systems, Quantum Computation, etc.

== Research Teams ==
The list of LIG teams is as follows:

- ADELE: Environments and tools for Industrial Software Engineering;
- AMA: Learning: models and algorithms;
- CAPP: Calculations algorithms programs and proofs;
- CTRL-A: Control for safe Autonomic computing systems;
- DRAKKAR: Networks and Multimedia;
- E-MOTION: Geometry and Probability for Movement and Action;
- EXMO: Computer mediated exchange of structured knowledge;
- GETALP: Study Group for Automatic Translation and Automated Processing of Languages and Speech;
- HAwAI: Human Aware Artificial Intelligence
- HADAS: Heterogenous autonomous distributed data services;
- IIHM: Human-machine interaction engineering;
- MESCAL: Middleware efficiently scalable;
- MeTAH: Method and technology in human learning;
- MOES: Multi-Programming and Distributed Resource Scheduling for Interactive Simulation Applications;
- MRIM: Multimedia Information Modeling and Research;
- MULTICOM: Participatory design, ergonomics, uses for interactive systems. Tools and methods;
- POP ART: Programming languages, operating systems, parallelism & aspects for real-time;
- PRIMA: Perception, recognition and integration for business modeling;
- SARDES: Architecture and construction of distributed software infrastructures;
- SIGMA: Information Systems - Adaptive Engineering and Modeling;
- STEAMER: Spatio-temporal information, adaptability, multimedia and knowledge representation;
- VASCO: Validation of Systems, Components and Software Objects;
- VASY: Validation of systems;
- WAM: Web adaptation and multimedia.

== Student life ==
=== The courses ===
Some masters offered by Grenoble-Alpes University require research workshops in the first and second year. Most of the workshops take place at the LIG, thanks to the geographical proximity of the buildings and to the proximity between the students and the teacher-researchers.

=== Student associations ===
There is a student association at LIG, LIG-Synergy. The aim of this association is to promote scientific and social life between PhD students working in the Grenoble computer lab or in collaboration with them. Its activities may be extended to include other personnel of the Laboratory, by welcoming newcomers, organizing social events and scientific seminars, and various services.
