= Josiane Zerubia =

Scientist at INRIA

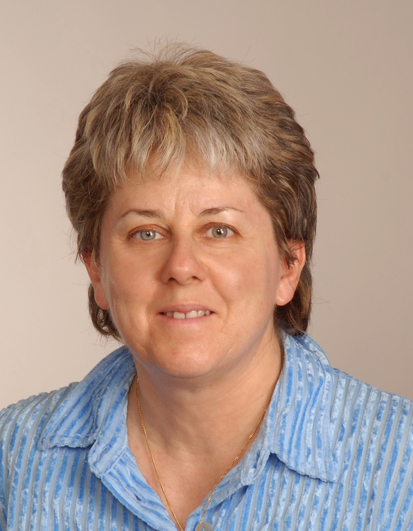
- Josiane Zerubia in 2007
- Education: University of Nice Sophia Antipolis; École nationale supérieure d'ingénieurs électriciens de Grenoble (ENSIEG)
- Known for: Image processing; Statistical learning; Artificial intelligence; Remote sensing
- Awards: IEEE Fellow
- Scientific career
- Fields: Image processing; Statistical learning; Artificial intelligence; Remote sensing
- Workplaces: INRIA Sophia Antipolis–Méditerranée (1989–present); Director of Research (DR1, 2002–2023); Director of Research Exceptional Class (DRCE, 2023–present)
- Website: Official website

Josiane Zerubia is a French research scientist. She is the Director of Research at INRIA (DRCE), Université Côte d'Azur. She was professor (PR1) at SUPAERO (ISAE) in Toulouse from 1999 to 2020.

== Education ==
She received her M.Sc. degree from the Department of EE at École nationale supérieure d'ingénieurs électriciens de Grenoble (ENSIEG), Grenoble, France in 1981. She defended her PhD in 1988, and obtained her 'Habilitation' in 1994, both from the University of Nice Sophia Antipolis, France.

== Work ==
She started her research career as a postdoc at the Signal and Image Processing Institute, Ming Hsieh Department of Electrical and Computer Engineering, University of Southern California (USC) in Los Angeles. Before that, she also worked as a researcher for the LASSY-CNRS (1984-1988) and at the Hewlett Packard Labs (1982-1984). Currently, she is a permanent research scientist at INRIA since 1989.

== Awards and honors ==
- IEEE Life Fellow (2026)
- IAPR Fellow (2020)
- EURASIP Fellow (2019)
- IEEE Signal Processing Society Distinguished Lecturer (2016-2017)
- Prize of Excellence from University of Côte d'Azur (2016, 2019, 2020)
- IEEE Clémentina SADUWA Prize (2016)
- IEEE Fellow (2003)
- Chevalier de l'Ordre National du Mérite (2002)
- IBM Academic and Research fellowship (1987)
- Société d'Entraide de la Légion d'Honneur (1978)

== Selected bibliography ==
=== Articles ===
- Abdlaty, Ramy; Doerwald-Munoz, Lilian; Madooei, Ali; Sahli, Samir; Yeh, Shu-Chi A.; Zerubia, Josiane; Wong, Raimond K. W.; Hayward, Joseph E.; Farrell, Thomas J.; Fang, Qiyin (28 August 2018). "Hyperspectral Imaging and Classification for Grading Skin Erythema". Frontiers in Physics. 6. doi:10.3389/fphy.2018.00072.
- Hedhli, Ihsen; Moser, Gabriele; Serpico, Sebastiano B.; Zerubia, Josiane (2017). "Classification of Multisensor and Multiresolution Remote Sensing Images Through Hierarchical Markov Random Fields" (PDF). IEEE Geoscience and Remote Sensing Letters: 1–5. doi:10.1109/LGRS.2017.2768398. S2CID 24299652.
- Krylov, Vladimir A.; Moser, Gabriele; Serpico, Sebastiano B.; Zerubia, Josiane (October 2016). "False Discovery Rate Approach to Unsupervised Image Change Detection" (PDF). IEEE Transactions on Image Processing. 25 (10): 4704–4718. Bibcode:2016ITIP...25.4704K. doi:10.1109/TIP.2016.2593340. PMID 27448356. S2CID 17546457.
- Benedek, Csaba; Shadaydeh, Maha; Kato, Zoltan; Szirányi, Tamás; Zerubia, Josiane (September 2015). "Multilayer Markov Random Field models for change detection in optical remote sensing images" (PDF). ISPRS Journal of Photogrammetry and Remote Sensing. 107: 22–37. Bibcode:2015JPRS..107...22B. doi:10.1016/j.isprsjprs.2015.02.006.
- Voisin, Aurelie; Krylov, Vladimir A.; Moser, Gabriele; Serpico, Sebastiano B.; Zerubia, Josiane (June 2014). "Supervised Classification of Multisensor and Multiresolution Remote Sensing Images With a Hierarchical Copula-Based Approach" (PDF). IEEE Transactions on Geoscience and Remote Sensing. 52 (6): 3346–3358. Bibcode:2014ITGRS..52.3346V. doi:10.1109/TGRS.2013.2272581. S2CID 7789566.

=== Books ===
- Mathematical Models for Remote Sensing Image Processing: Models and Methods for the Analysis of 2D Satellite and Aerial Images. Springer International Publishing. 2018. ISBN 978-3-319-66328-9.
- Modeling in Computational Biology and Biomedicine: A Multidisciplinary Endeavor. Springer-Verlag. 2013. ISBN 978-3-642-31207-6.
- Energy Minimization Methods in Computer Vision and Pattern Recognition: Third International Workshop, EMMCVPR 2001, Sophia Antipolis France, September 3-5, 2001. Proceedings. Springer-Verlag. 2001. ISBN 978-3-540-42523-6.
