= Antoine Kahn =

American professor of electrical engineering

Antoine Kahn is an American professor of electrical engineering and is a fellow of such societies as the American Vacuum Society since 1999 and American Physical Society to which he was elected in 2002. In 1974 he received a diploma from the Grenoble Institute of Technology in electronic engineering and also has both master's and Ph.D. degrees from Princeton University which he obtained in 1976 and 1978 respectively.
