= L'Usine nouvelle =

French trade magazine on business and technology

- Publisher: Groupe Industrie Services Info (GISI)
- Founded: 1891
- First issue: 5 December 1891; 134 years ago
- Company: InfoPro Communications
- Country: France
- Based in: Antony, Hauts-de-Seine
- Language: French
- Website: usinenouvelle.com
- ISSN: 0042-126X

L'Usine nouvelle is a monthly French business magazine that covers business and technology. It is based in Antony, Hauts-de-Seine near Paris.

== History ==
This trade magazine appeared for the first time on 5 December 1891 in Charleville in the Ardennes department in northeastern France with the title l'Usine, subtitled "Organe de l'industrie des Ardennes et du Nord-Est" ("Organ of Industry of the Ardennes and the North-East"). It was published with the encouragement of a regional trade association, the Syndicat des industriels métallurgiques ardennais. And an editorial was specific: "L'Usine hopes to become the organ for everyone who has at heart the prosperity of the industries of the Ardennes and their expansion." It was a newspaper conceived entrepreneurs for entrepreneurs. It was an information tool to help them act and make decisions, and a communications tool and source of advertising for managers. At that time, the Ardennes and the northeast of France were considered a favoured area for industrial development.

In 1905, it was bought by Camille Didier, who had become its publisher in 1901 at the age of 26 and who had opened an office in Paris. Camille Didier sought to turn l'Usine into a nationally distributed magazine.

In 1914, the magazine had 3,000 subscribers. In response to the invasion of France by Germany during World War I, the newspaper moved its office to Paris and remained there. In 1935, the magazine printed 35,000 copies of each issues and its office was at 15 de la rue Bleue.

At the outbreak of World War II, the magazine called on its readers to support the war effort. After Paris was occupied by German forces, the magazine continued to publish but limited itself to factual information such as commodity prices. At the time of the Liberation of Paris, its publisher (still Camille Didier) was accused of having collaborated with the enemy by continuing to publish during the German occupation. He was supported by his cousin Jeanne Carlot, a resistance figure in the Ardennes who had published an underground resistance newspaper named l'Ardenne.

After an interruption of 11 months, the magazine resumed publication in 1945 with a new name, l'Usine nouvelle. The magazine grew during the Trente Glorieuses, the period of economic growth in France from 1945 until 1975. It became a jewel of the general trade press, with a strong position. Camille Didier died in 1962, and his son, Édouard Didier, took over.

In 1968, its publication was interrupted by a strike by the C.G.T. trade union confederation at the printing plant in Montrouge. In 1970, the Didier family sold the magazine to Havas. The editorial process was computerized in 1992 and a website was launched in 1998. Havas was acquired by Vivendi Universal. Vivendi Universal sold its trade and medical publishing businesses to a group led by Cinven in 2001, who created Approvia. Approvia sold Groupe Moniteur, of which L'Usine nouvelle was a part, to Sagard in 2004. In 2006, Groupe Moniteur was sold to Bridgepoint Capital. In 2013, Bridgepoint sold Groupe Moniteur to Infopro Digital, then owned by Apax Partners France, today known as Seven2. TowerBrook Capital Partners acquired Infopro Digital. TowerBrook Capital Partners acquired Infopro Digital from Apax Partners France in 2016.

== Key people ==
- Président directeur général: Christophe Czajka
- Directeur général délégué: Paul Boursier
- Directeur des rédactions du pôle Industrie: Laurent Guez
- Rédacteur en chef: Thibaut De Jaegher
- Rédaction en chef déléguée for the Usinenouvelle.com website: Stéphan Julienne

== Online edition ==
Usinenouvelle.com is a site for business and industrial news, republishing articles from the L’Usine nouvelle magazine and from other sources such as wire services. It received an award from the Palmarès de la Presse Professionnelle for the best Internet site in 2003.
