= Polygone Scientifique =

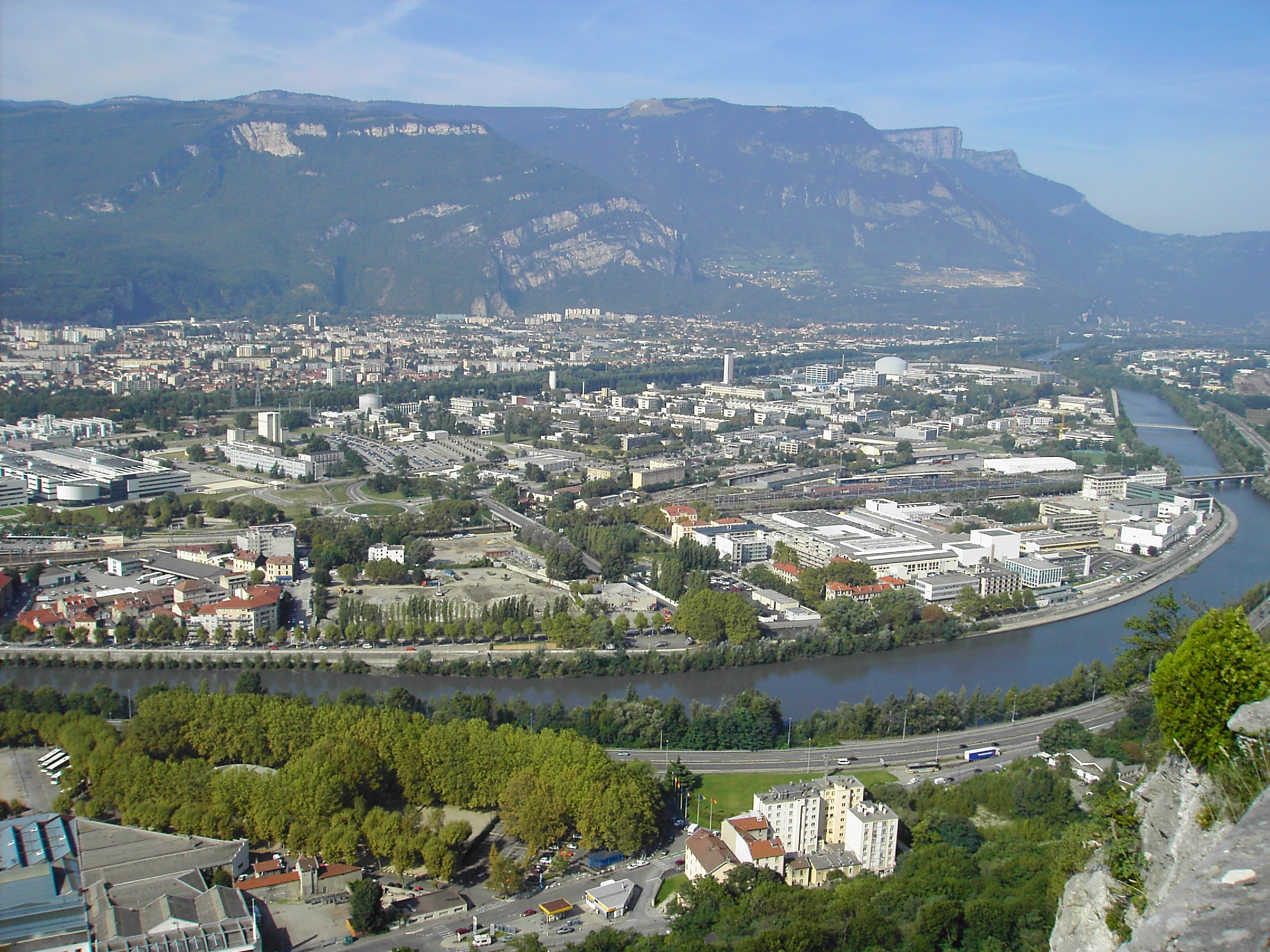
View of the Polygone Scientifique in 2008.

The Polygone Scientifique (en: Scientific Polygon), nowadays known as Presqu'Île (peninsula) is a neighborhood of the city of Grenoble in France. It includes a significant number of research centers in a peninsula between Isère and Drac.

== History ==
The area was formerly a polygone d'artillerie or artillery range, with ammunition depots, thus the name.

Polygon hosts in 1956 the first French Atomic Energy Commission (CEA) outside Paris and created by Professor Louis Néel. In 1962, it hosts a campus CNRS. In 1967, the Laboratoire d'électronique et de technologie de l'information was founded by CEA and became one of the world's largest organizations for applied research in microelectronics and nanotechnology.

Three international organizations are implanted between 1973 and 1988 with the Institut Laue–Langevin, the European Synchrotron Radiation Facility and one of the five branches of the European Molecular Biology Laboratory. In 2006, the complex Minatec specializing in nanotechnology opens on the Polygon and in 2007, the Institut Néel, specializing in condensed matter physics, is founded.

National Laboratory for Intense Magnetic Fields has also numerous collaborations in terms of technical and technological innovations with these institutions.

In 2008, the new innovation campus is called GIANT (Grenoble Innovation for Advanced New Technologies).

In 2012, Clinatec is founded on Polygone Scientifique by Professor Alim-Louis Benabid.

== Transportation ==
The Polygon is served by Grenoble tramway.

== See also ==
- National Institute for Materials Science

== Bibliography ==
- Malecki, Edward J.; Moriset, Bruno (2001). The Digital Economy: Business Organization, Production Processes and regional developments. Routledege. ISBN 9781134154173.
- Ramani, Shyama V. (2014). Nanotechnology and Development: What's in it for Emerging Countries?. Cambridge University Press. ISBN 978-1-107-03758-8.
