= Saman Amarasinghe =

Saman Prabhath Amarasinghe is a professor in the department of electrical engineering and computer science at the Massachusetts Institute of Technology (MIT). His work has focused on computer architectures, programming languages and compilers that maximize application performance, including helping create multiple domain-specific languages (DSLs) such as Halide for image processing.

== Education and career ==
After studies at Royal College, Colombo (1972-1982) and the University of Moratuwa (1984) in Sri Lanka, Amarasinghe received his B.S. degree in electrical engineering and computer science from Cornell University in New York (1988). Spending summers working at Microsoft, he then earned a master's degree in electrical engineering from Stanford University (1990). After working as a consultant and software engineer, he was the co-founder and director of Lanka Internet Services, Ltd. (1994-2001), the first ISP in Sri Lanka. He completed a PhD in electrical engineering at Stanford University (1997) and then joined the department of electrical engineering and computer science at MIT as an assistant professor (1997). He was eventually tenured, and was promoted to full professor in 2009. He is conducting research there as part of the Computer Science and Artificial Intelligence Laboratory (CSAIL) and leading the lab's Commit compiler research group.

== Honors and awards ==
In 2019 he was named a Fellow of the Association for Computing Machinery for “contributions to high performance computing on modern hardware platforms, domain-specific languages, and compilation techniques”.
