= Institut Néel =

Research institute on magnetism in Grenoble, France

Institut Néel is a research laboratory in condensed matter physics located on Polygone Scientifique in Grenoble, France. It is named after scientist Louis Néel.

The institute is an independent research unit (UPR2940) of the French Centre national de la recherche scientifique created in 2007 as a reorganization of four research laboratories: the center for research in very low temperatures (Centre de Recherches sur les très basses températures (CRTBT)), the laboratory for the study of electronic properties of solids (laboratoire d'étude des propriétés électroniques des solides (LEPES)), the Louis Néel laboratory (laboratoire Louis Néel (LLN)), and the Laboratory of crystallography (Laboratoire de cristallographie (LdC)).
