= Centre Hospitalier Universitaire Grenoble Alpes =

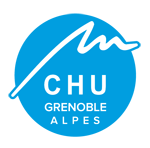

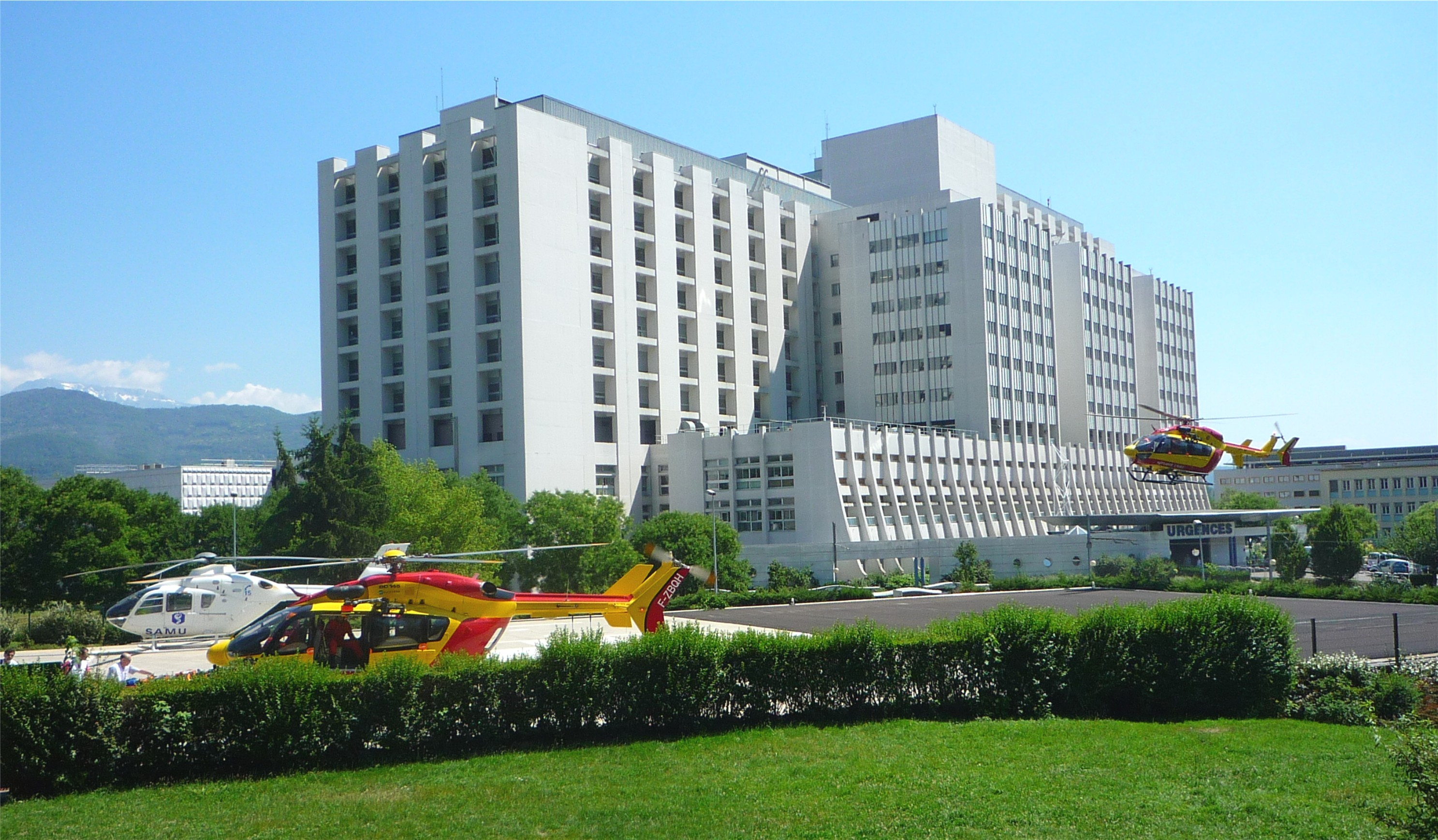
- CHU Grenoble with its heliport.

Geography
- Location: Grenoble, France
- Coordinates: 45.201°N 5.745°E

Organisation
- Type: Teaching hospital
- Affiliated university: Grenoble Alpes University

Services
- Emergency department: Yes
- Beds: 2 133

History
- Former name: CHU de Grenoble
- Opened: 1974

Links
- Website: www.chu-grenoble.fr
- Lists: Hospitals in France

The Grenoble Alpes University Hospital (French: Centre Hospitalier Universitaire Grenoble Alpes, abbreviated as CHU Grenoble Alpes or CHUGA) is a French teaching hospital built in 1974. With a total capacity of over 2,000 beds, it is the main hospital of Grenoble and Isère in France. The CHU Grenoble receives all phone calls from the department of Isère dialled through the emergency number 15 (telephone number of emergency medical assistance service) via the Reception Center and Call Control.

Grenoble urban unit has nearly 500,000 inhabitants in the department of Isère of over 1.2 million. With an operating budget of €713 million in 2017, the hospital employs over 9 000 employees (including 2,000 doctors) that makes it the largest employer in the Grenoble area before STMicroelectronics and Schneider Electric. Hospital facilities are mainly located in La Tronche (Site Nord) and Echirolles (Site Sud) of Grenoble agglomeration.

As a teaching hospital, CHUGA is actively engaged in medical research (e.g. Clinatec, NanoBio, G-IN, IAB), including through its affiliation with Grenoble Alpes University.

== Ranking ==
CHU Grenoble Alpes is ranked as the 10th out of over 1400 public hospital in France. In 2020, CHUGA was ranked 45th worldwide in clinical medicine.

CHU Grenoble Alpes was the first university hospital to obtain a global A-level accreditation from HAS, the French National Authority for Health.

== See also ==
- Hospital General of Grenoble
- Grenoble Alpes University
