= École nationale supérieure d'ingénieurs électriciens de Grenoble =

ENSIEG, École nationale supérieure d'ingénieurs électriciens de Grenoble
- Type: Grande École
- Established: 1900, disestablished 2008 merged into ENSE³
- Affiliations: Grenoble Institute of Technology
- Location: Grenoble, France; 45.195047°N 5.710149°E
- Campus: suburban

The École nationale supérieure d'ingénieurs électriciens de Grenoble—ENSIEG, (French for 'National Higher School of Electrical Engineers of Grenoble') was a centenary school (1900−2008) located at the Institut National Polytechnique de Grenoble in Grenoble, France. It was the first "grande école" of engineers at the present day Grenoble Institute of Technology.

The school's three main axes of education revolved around Electrotechnics/Power Electronics, Automatic control/Control theory, and Signal Processing.

Around 160 electrical engineers graduated each year from ENSIEG serving a wide spectrum of industries.

== Merged ==
In 2008, ENSIEG merged with the École nationale supérieure d'hydraulique et de mécanique de Grenoble—ENSHM (National Higher School of Hydraulics and Mechanics of Grenoble). ENSHM later became the École nationale supérieure de l'énergie, l'eau et l'environnement—ENSE³ (Superior National School of Energy, Water and Environment).

== See also ==
- Former schools of the Grenoble Institute of Technology
- French electrical engineers
- Engineering universities and colleges in France
