= École Nationale Supérieure d'Électrochimie et d'Électrométallurgie de Grenoble =

The École Nationale Supérieure d'Électrochimie et d'Électrométallurgie de Grenoble, or ENSEEG, was one of the French Grandes écoles of engineering (engineering schools). It was created in 1921 under the name Institut d’électrochimie et d’électrométallurgie (IEE) (Institute of Electrochemistry and Electrometallurgy). The name ENSEEG was chosen in 1948 and ENSEEG was part of Grenoble Institute of Technology (INPG or GIT) from its creation in 1971. Therefore, the name INPG-ENSEEG has also been commonly used.

ENSEEG delivered a multidisciplinary education in physical chemistry. The ENSEEG engineers are especially competent in materials science, process engineering and electrochemistry. From September 2008, ENSEEG merged with two other Grandes écoles to create Phelma.

ENSEEG Dean List
From... to...	Name
1921–1945	M. Georges Flusin
1945–1959	M. Lucien Andrieux
1959–1971	M. Jean Besson
1971–1975	M. Lucien Bonnetain
1975–1988	M. Jean-Charles Pariaud
1988–1995	M. Pierre Hicter
1995–2005	M. Jean-Claude Poignet
2005–2008	M. Jean-Pierre Petit

ENSEEG Most Famous Alumni
Graduation year	Name
1971	M. Jean-Jacques Favier
2001	M. Cyril Abiteboul
