= Grenoble Institute of Technology =

Research institute in France

Coordinates: 45.1909°N 5.7170°E

- Type: Grande école
- Established: 1900
- Administrative staff: 350 (permanent professors)
- Students: about 5300
- Location: Grenoble, Isère, France
- Campus: Grenoble-Viallet; Grenoble-Minatec; Saint-Martin-d'Hères; Valence
- Affiliations: Grenoble Alpes University, CLUSTER, UNITE!, CESAER
- Website: www.grenoble-inp.fr

The Grenoble Institute of Technology (Grenoble INP) (Institut polytechnique de Grenoble [ɛ̃stity pɔlitɛknik də ɡʁənɔbl], Groupe Grenoble INP and before INPG) (Note: Since May 2006 and the creation of its new website, Grenoble INP has chosen this name to communicate its image across the borders. In the past, names such as Grenoble National Polytechnical Institute or National Polytechnical Institute of Grenoble were sometimes used. Grenoble INP calls itself the Grenoble Institute of Technology, or Grenoble INP, on its English language web site (retrieved 2007-1028).) is a French technological university system consisting of eight engineering and management schools.

Grenoble INP also has a two-year preparatory class program, an adult education department, as well as 21 laboratories and a graduate school in Engineering Sciences. More than 1,100 engineers graduate every year from Grenoble INP, making it France's biggest grande école.

Most of Grenoble INP is located in Grenoble, except for the ESISAR which is located in Valence.

== History ==
Grenoble INP was born in the Alpine environment. It was officially founded in 1900 with the creation of the Electrical Engineering Institute. Industrial pioneers of a century ago found that after mastering hydraulic power and creating the initial industrial applications, they had also created a need for well-trained engineers.

The first of its type in France, Grenoble INP became polytechnical and grew continuously in scale, becoming the National Polytechnical Institute (INPG) in 1971 with Louis Néel, Nobel Laureate in Physics as its first President.

Grenoble INP is currently contributing to the Minatec project, one of Europe's biggest nanosciences research center. Since December 2014, Grenoble Institute of Technology is member of the Community Grenoble Alpes University.

The Grenoble Institute of Technology has been awarded the title "European University" by the European Commission. Together with 6 other European technical universities, the Grenoble Institute of Technology has formed the alliance UNITE! (University Network for Innovation, Technology and Engineering). The aim of the project is to create a trans-European campus, to introduce trans-European curricula, to promote scientific cooperation between the members and to strengthen knowledge transfer between the countries. The alliance includes Technische Universität Darmstadt, Aalto University, the Royal Institute of Technology, the Polytechnic University of Turin, the Polytechnic University of Catalonia and the University of Lisbon.

== Organization ==
Academic staff and researchers:

- 1250 teaching staff (350 permanent)
- 1400 researchers (300 permanent)
- 450 administrative and technical staff

Students: (2014 figures)

- 1,428 degree students
- 3,036 masters students
- 842 doctorate students

The total number of students in 2014–2015 was 5,306 students, including 1,152 international students.

Most of the students enter Grenoble INP after a two-year undergraduate program, the French classes préparatoires aux grandes écoles, the selection being made according to the results of an entrance exam. However a few students (less than 10%) can be admitted at the INPG without needing to take an entrance exam. Such students have to follow another two-year undergraduate program called the CPP Preparatory Course and to have a minimum entrance average at the end of the program. This program has been created by the French INPs in [1993] in order to attract even more French high school-leavers as well as students with particular sporting or musical talents.

Each year, Grenoble INP graduates: (2004 figures)

- 1,046 engineers with a "Diplôme d'ingénieur" (five-year curricula)
- 332 DEA (master level)
- 146 [PhD]

== Schools ==
- The École nationale supérieure de l'énergie, l'eau et l'environnement or Ense^{3} (Energy, Water and Environmental Sciences), founded in 2008, created from the merge of the former schools ENSHMG and ENSIEG.
- The Ecole nationale supérieure d'informatique et de mathématiques appliquées de Grenoble or Ensimag, founded in 1960: trains engineers to master the design and use of computer and mathematical tools: VLSI and computer design, software engineering, telecommunications and networks, distributed applications and systems, image processing and synthesis, economic and financial systems modeling, scientific computation. The Département Télécommunications founded by ENSIMAG and ENSERG in 1999 has merged with Ensimag.
- The École nationale supérieure d'ingénieurs des systèmes avancés et réseaux or Esisar, was founded in 1995 and based in Valence. The school trains engineers to master technology of informations and of communication.
- The École nationale supérieure de génie industriel or Génie industriel founded in 1990, is the industrial and system engineering department of the institute. It trains engineers specialized in organization and technological management. Génie industriel was created from the merger of ENSGI and ENSHMG.
- The École internationale du papier, de la communication imprimée et des biomatériaux or Pagora, was founded in 1907 It trains engineers for the paper and graphics industries: physical chemistry and mechanics, process engineering, paper production and conversion, and printing techniques.
- The École nationale supérieure de physique, électronique et matériaux or Phelma (Physics, Applied Physics, Electronics and Materials Science), founded in 2008, created from the merge of the former schools ENSPG, ENSEEG and ENSERG.
- The École polytechnique universitaire de Grenoble-Alpes or Polytech Grenoble, was founded in 2002. The school offers various courses of modern technological fields.
- The Institut d'administration des entreprises de Grenoble or Grenoble IAE, was founded in 1956. It is the public management school of the Grenoble Alpes University.

=== Former schools ===
In 2008, some schools merged, and some other changed their names. From ten schools or departments, the group reorganized the courses and reduced the number of schools down to eight.

- Département Télécommunications (ENSIMAG-ENSERG), founded in 1999: trains engineers to master the design and use of computer and telecommunication tools: VLSI and computer design, software engineering, telecommunications and networks, electronics. It merged in 2008 with Ensimag.
- École Nationale Supérieure de Physique de Grenoble (ENSPG), founded in 1985: trains engineers in physical sciences, nanotechnologies, materials science, electronic and optoelectronic devices, energy and nuclear engineering and physical instrumentation. ENSPG trains physics engineers with a strong scientific background. Graduates are employed mainly in basic and applied research or in development. Its activity was transferred in 2008 in the new school Phelma.
- École Nationale Supérieure d'Électrochimie et d'Électrométallurgie de Grenoble (ENSEEG), founded in 1921: trains engineers in the fields of physical chemistry, materials science, process engineering and electrochemistry. Its activity was transferred in 2008 in the new school Phelma.
- École nationale supérieure d'électronique et de radioélectricité de Grenoble (ENSERG), founded in 1958: trains engineers in electronics from basic components to complex circuits and telecommunications systems, image and word processing, computer and multimedia systems. Its activity was transferred in 2008 in the new school Phelma.
- École nationale supérieure d'ingénieurs électriciens de Grenoble (ENSIEG), founded in 1901: trains engineers in electrical engineering and its industrial applications of production and transformation, systems automation, production systems, robotics and signal processing. Its activity was transferred in 2008 in the new school Ense^{3}.
- École Nationale Supérieure d'Hydraulique et de Mécanique de Grenoble (ENSHMG), founded in 1928; trained engineers in the fields of fluid mechanics, hydraulics and water resources, environmental sciences and mechanical engineering. Its activity was transferred in 2008 in the new school Ense^{3}.

== Alumni ==
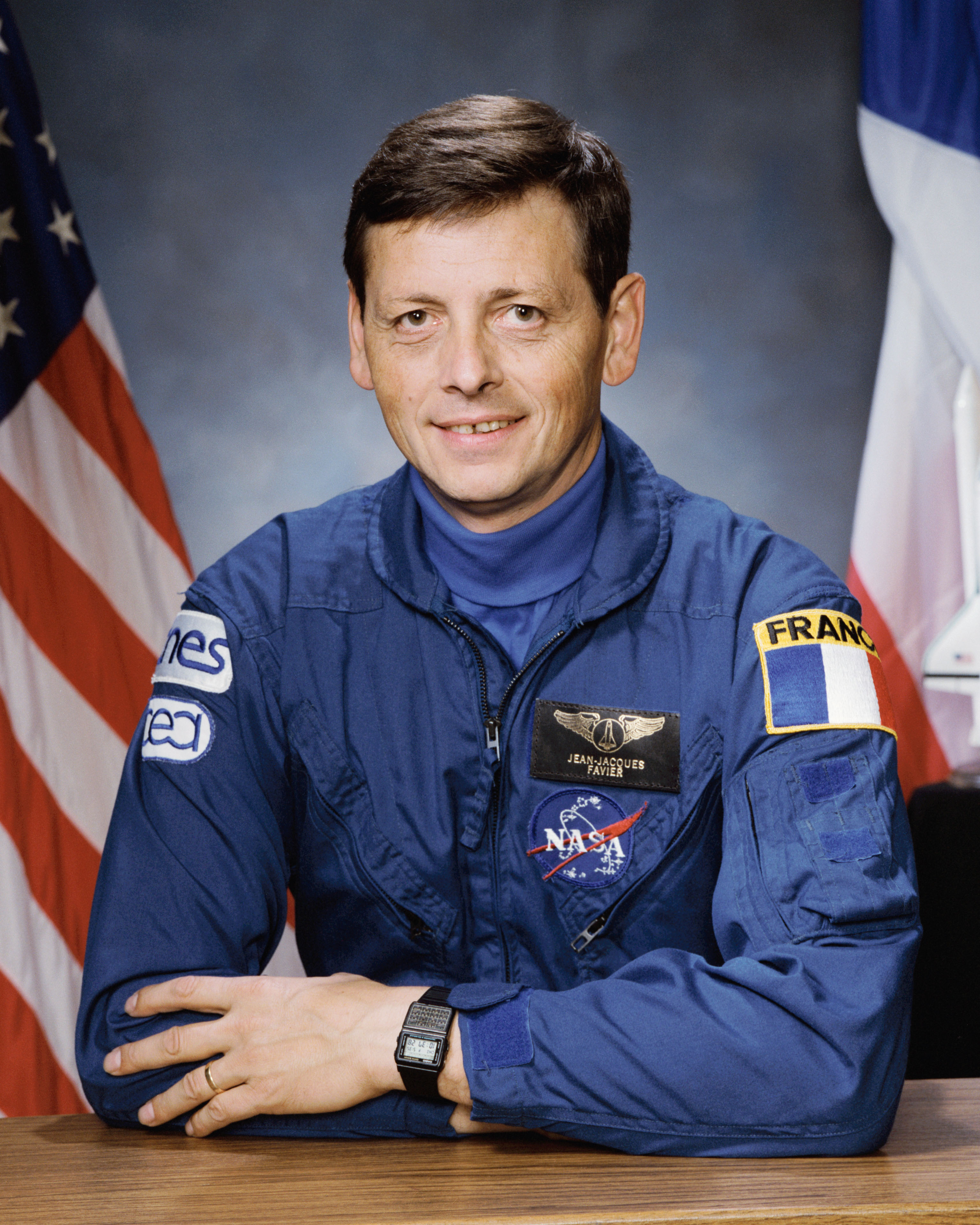
Jean-Jacques Favier.
French astronaut.

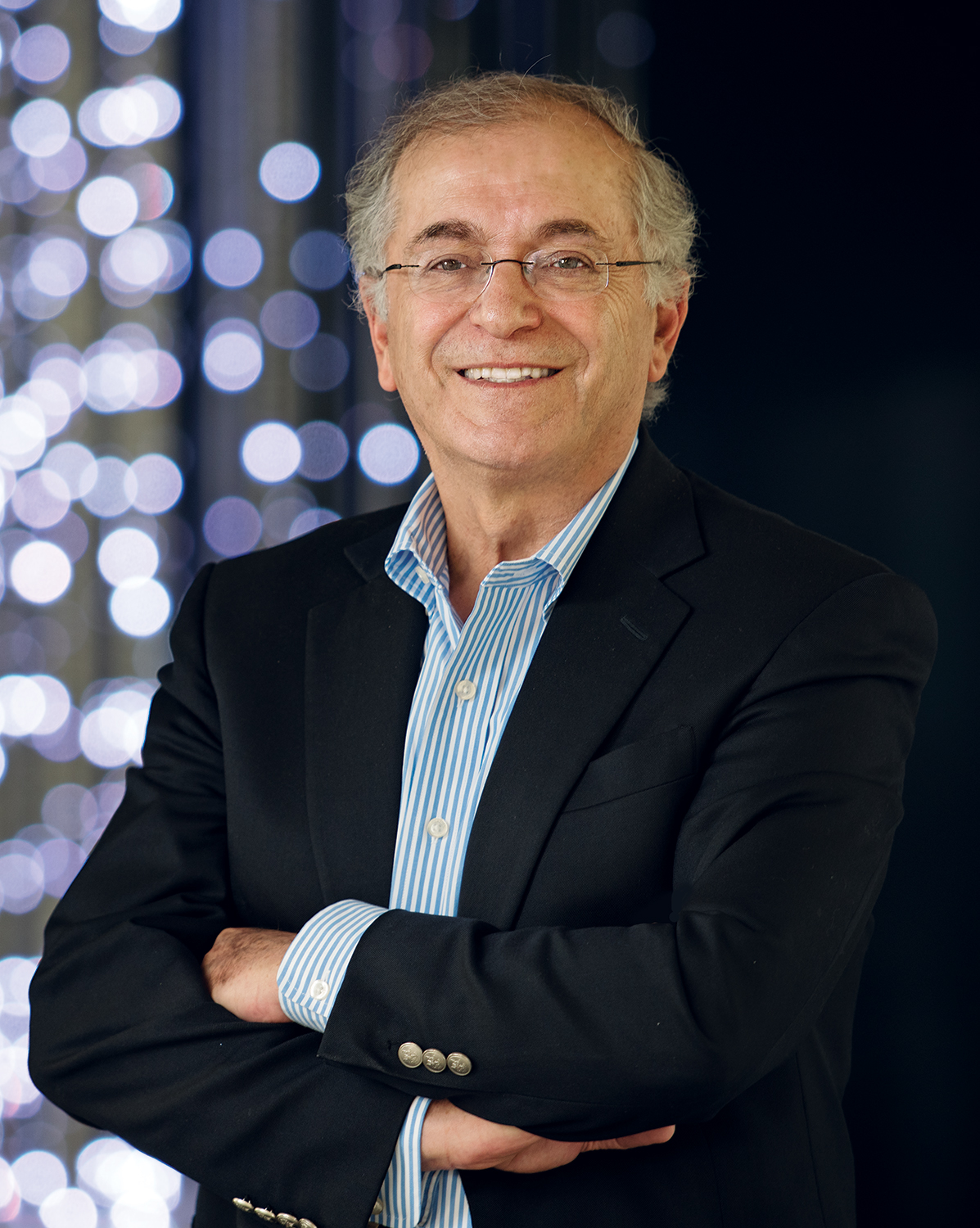
Charles Elachi. Director of Jet Propulsion Lab.

- Vincent Blondel
- Abdelghani Bousta
- Jean Calvignac
- Patrice Cellario, Monaco's Interior Minister
- Mike Coey
- Alain Colmerauer
- Claire Deschênes
- Fredo Durand, computer scientist
- Charles Elachi
- Frédéric Brun, co-founder of music technology company Arturia
- Gilles Pommereuil, co-founder of music technology company Arturia
- Jean-Jacques Favier
- Emad Abdul-Ghani Sabouni
- Adrian Mihai Ionescu
- Geneviève Jourdain engineer, professor and researcher, worked on development of signal processing
- Antoine Kahn
- Jean-Claude Latombe
- Romeo Ortega
- Marie-Louise Paris
- Elisabeth Pate-Cornell
- Éric Piolle
- Rachid Yazami
- Nobu Tamura
- Roland Busch
