= École nationale supérieure d'informatique et de mathématiques appliquées de Grenoble =

French higher education institute

Coordinates: 45°11′37″N 5°46′06″E

Ensimag
- Type: Grande école
- Established: 1960
- President: Vivien Quéma
- Location: Grenoble, France
- Campus: Suburban
- Website: ensimag.grenoble-inp.fr

The École nationale supérieure d'informatique et de mathématiques appliquées, or Ensimag, is a French grande école located in Grenoble, France. Ensimag is part of the Institut polytechnique de Grenoble (Grenoble INP). The school specializes in computer science, applied mathematics and telecommunications.

Students are usually admitted to Ensimag competitively following two years of undergraduate studies in classes préparatoires aux grandes écoles. Studies at Ensimag are of three years' duration and lead to the French degree of "Diplôme National d'Ingénieur" (equivalent to a master's degree).

Ensimag was founded in 1960 by French mathematician Jean Kuntzmann. About 250 students graduate from Ensimag each year in its different degrees, and the school counts more than 5500 alumni worldwide.

== Ensimag graduate specializations ==
Ensimag's curriculum offers a variety of compulsory and elective advanced courses, making up specific profiles. Most of the common core courses are taught in the first year and the first semester of the second year, allowing students to acquire the basics in applied mathematics and informatics. Students then choose a graduate specialization.

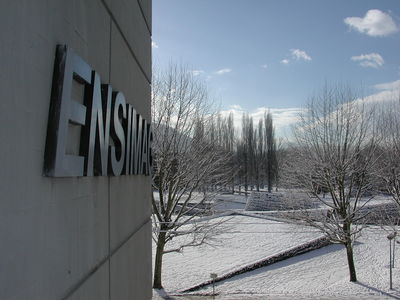
Ensimag campus in winter

== International Master's programs ==
=== Master of Science in Informatics at Grenoble (MoSIG) ===
Since September 2008, an English-language joint degree program with the University of Grenoble provides a highly competitive, two-year graduate Master's degree program.

=== Master in Communication Systems Engineering ===
Offered jointly by Ensimag and Politecnico di Torino (Italy), this four-semester course aims to train engineers to specialize in the design and management of communication systems, ranging from simple point-to-point transmissions to diversified telecommunications networks.

== Research at Ensimag ==
Ensimag students can perform research work as part of their curriculum in second year, as well as a second-year internship and their end of studies project in a research laboratory. 15% of Ensimag graduates choose to pursue a Ph.D.. Ensimag has global academic partnerships with universities like EPFL, ETH Zurich, Technical University of Munich, TU of Berlin, Carnegie Mellon, KU Leuven, Aalto, TU of Eindhoven, Politecnico di Milano, Politecnico di Torino, KTH and Trinity College Dublin.

== Rankings ==
The school is one of the top French engineering institutions. In the field of computer science, Ensimag was ranked first in France by Codingame, as measured by the position of its students in the national admission examinations and by the ranking of companies hiring its students and specialized media.. 1st in the 2025 ranking of engineering schools specialized in Computer Science (Le Figaro Étudiant)
