= Minatec =

Research complex in Grenoble, France

Coordinates: 45°11′44″N 5°42′30″E

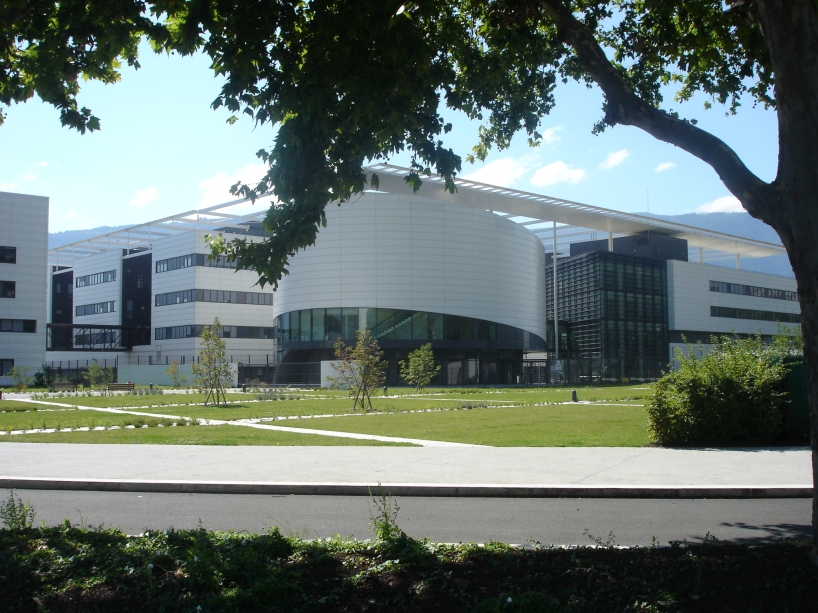
Minatec in August 2007

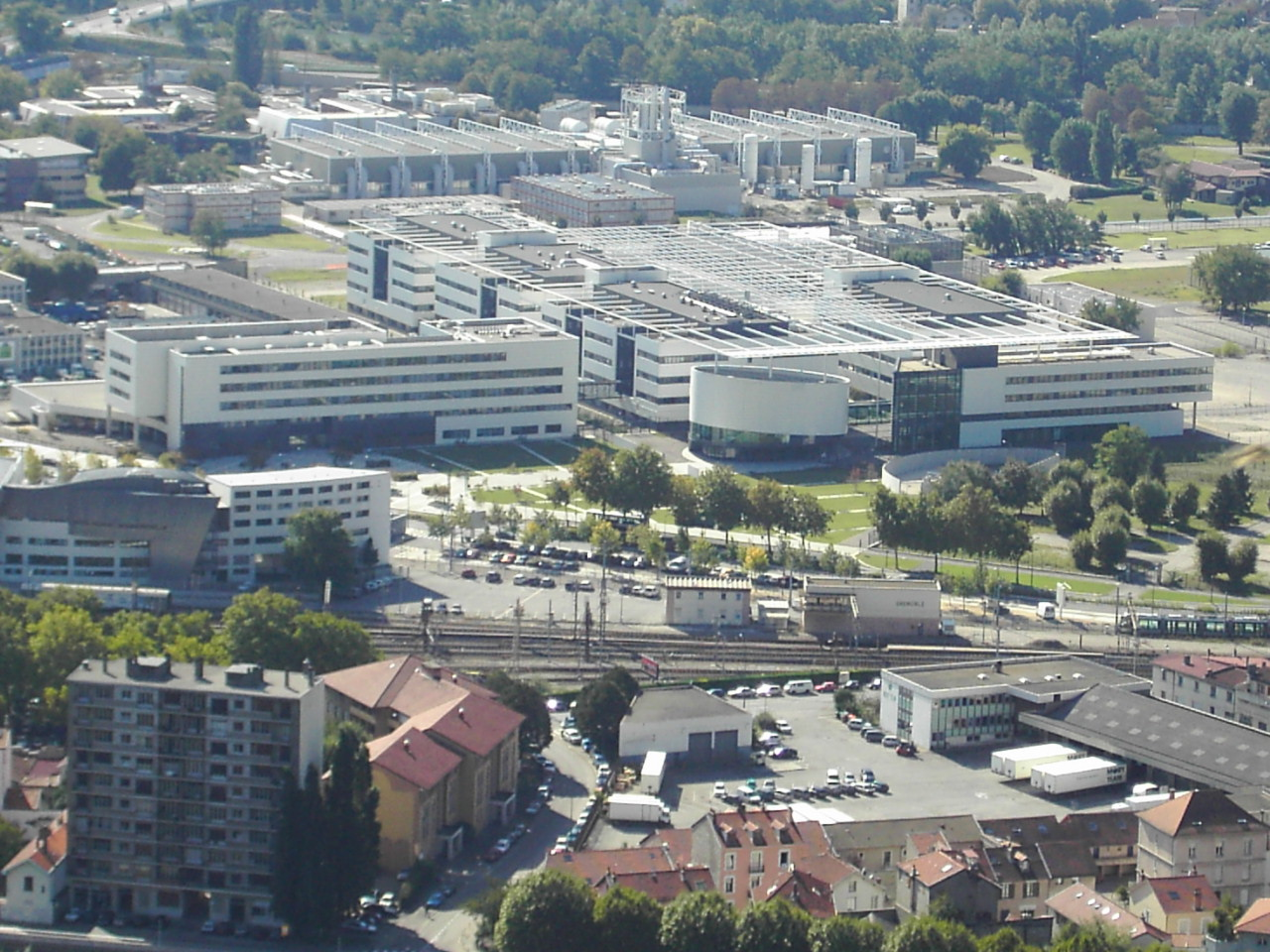
Minatec from the Bastille

Minatec (initially called the Micro and Nanotechnology Innovation Centre) is a research complex specializing in micro/nano technologies in Grenoble, France.

The center was inaugurated in June 2006 by François Loos, French Minister Delegate for Industry, as a partnership between LETI (the Electronics and Information Technologies Laboratory of CEA, the French Atomic Energy Commission) and by Grenoble Institute of Technology (Université Grenoble Alpes). The site was already home to LETI, Europe's top center for applied research in microelectronics and nanotechnology. Minatec combines a physical research campus with a network of companies, researchers, and engineering schools. It was launched to foster technology transfer, with applications in energy and communications.

The complex is home to 3,000 researchers, 1,200 students, and 600 technology transfer experts on a 20-hectare campus offering 10,000 square meters for cleanroom space. It offers a continuum that includes student technology transfer, industry, and applied research.

The Minatec campus has dedicated special-events facilities (900 m²), including a 20-person conference rooms and a 400-seat amphitheater. These spaces are available to researchers for their scientific events such as the international conference held every two years.

Minatec includes fundamental research labs like INAC and FMNT, plus a major technological research lab, Leti. MINATEC also cooperates with the INSTITUT NÉEL and RTRA, which are located nearby.

== Funding ==
Minatec represents an investment of 193.5 million euros between 2002 and 2005, mainly paid by local authorities and the CEA.

== See also ==
- Polygone Scientifique
