= Boomerang Nebula =

Protoplanetary nebula in the constellation Centaurus

Reflection nebula
- Protoplanetary nebula
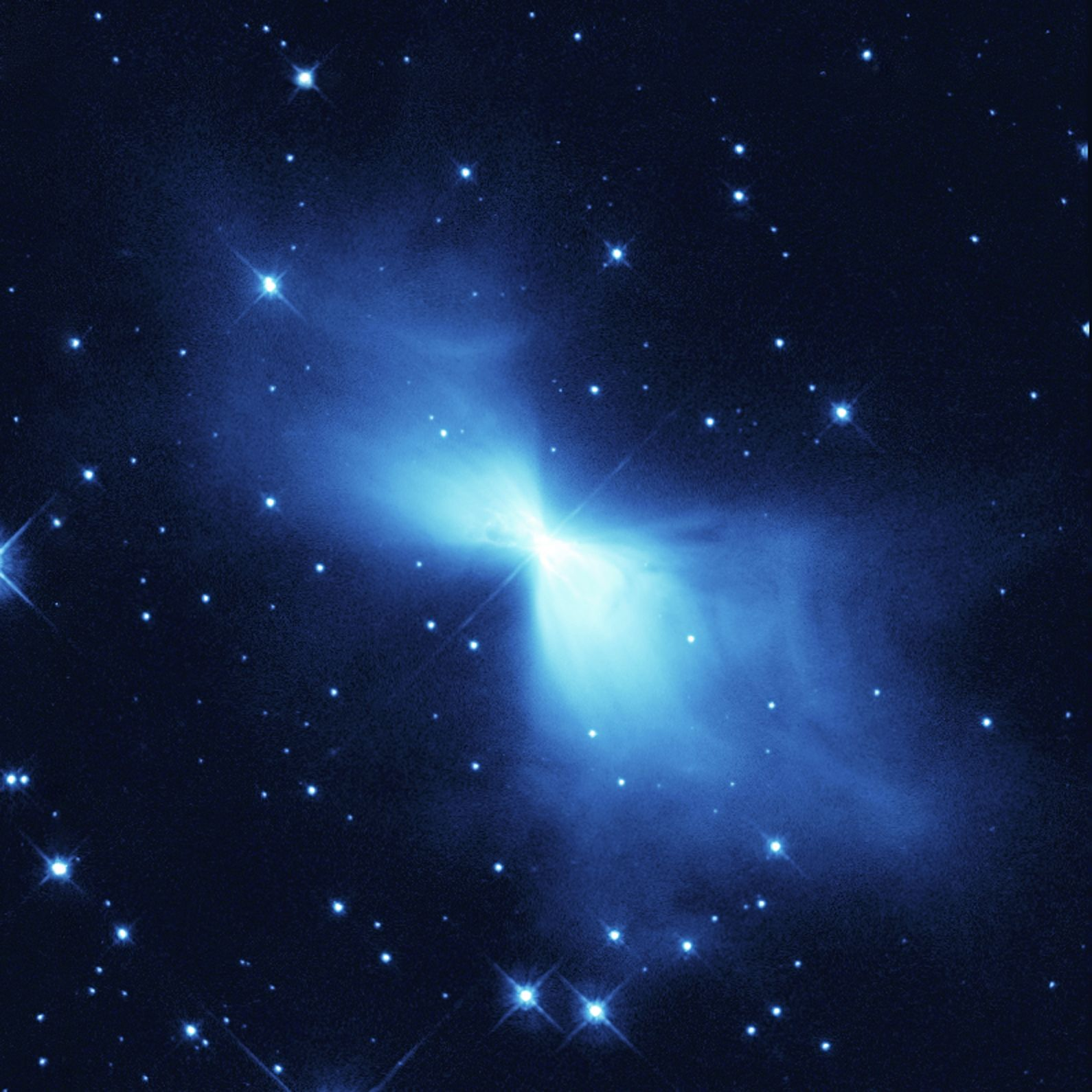
- Imaged by the Hubble's Wide Field Planetary Camera 2

Observation data: J2000 epoch
- Right ascension: 12^{h} 44^{m} 45.45^{s} 12^{h} 44^{m} 46.09^{s}
- Declination: −54° 31′ 11.4″ / −54° 31′ 12.0″
- Distance: 1213±60 / 5000 ly (372±18 pc)
- Apparent dimensions (V): 1.445′ × 0.724′
- Constellation: Centaurus

Physical characteristics
- Radius: 1 ly
- Designations: 2MASS: J12444609-5431133; AKARI-FIS-V1: J1244457-543115; AKARI-IRC-V1: J1244461-543113; Centaurus Bipolar Nebula; ESO: 172-7; Gaia DR2 6073662099660289536; Gaia DR3 6073662099660289536; GN (Gal. Nebula) 12.41.9; HBC (Herbig+Bell, Catalog) 592; IRAS: 12419−5414; [LFO93](Loup+Forveille+Omont+) 1241-54; LEDA: 3074547; PGC: 3074547; SNR: (PWN) G106.6+2.9; TeV (Scott Wakely & Deirdre Horan): J2228+611; TIC (TESS Input Catalog) 419500551; UCAC4 178-100510; WISEA (AllWISE Source Catalog) J124446.09-543113.2; WISE J124446.09-543113.2; WKK98 (Woudt+Kraan-Korteweg+) 1328

The Boomerang Nebula is a bipolar reflection young planetary nebula located approximately 5,000 light-years from Earth in the constellation Centaurus.

Holmberg & Lauberts (Uppsala Observatory) and Schuster & West (European Southern Observatory (ESO)) in their survey of 1976 or earlier discovered the existence of an object at the location. Before or during 1978 I.S. Glass discovered the object as a nebula with G. Wegner, both of South African Astronomical Observatory, from data of the ESO Quick Blue Survey. Wegner and Glass in their paper of 1979 mentioned a "butterfly" or "bow-tie" like shape. K. N. R. Taylor (University of New South Wales) and S. M. Scarrott (Durham University) made observations July 17, 1979 and named it after the boomerang. Modelling of measurements of outflow of the nebula published 1997 by Sahai (Jet Propulsion Laboratory) and Nyman (ESO & Onsala Space Observatory) indicate kelvin (K) less than cosmic microwave background radiation (cmbr), making it the coldest natural place currently known.

The central star is an old star. The max-diametrical temperature of the central star is estimated to be 6000 K (by Wegner and Glass 1978 or earlier) or 7000 K (Bujarrabal & Bachiller before July 1990).

The Boomerang Nebula is believed to be a star system evolving toward the planetary nebula phase. It continues to form and develop due to the outflow of gas from its core where a star in its late stage life sheds mass and emits starlight, illuminating dust in the nebula. Millimeter scale dust grains obscure portions of the nebula's center, so most escaping visible light is in two opposing lobes forming a distinctive hourglass shape as viewed by space telescope data on Earth. The outflowing gas at about 164 km/s expands rapidly into space; this gas expansion results in the nebula's unusual K.

Using observations from 1994 and 1995 with the 15-metre Swedish-ESO Submillimetre Telescope in Chile, the astronomers Sahai & Nyman concluded carbon monoxide (CO) molecules produced after stellar co-absorption in a binary system of the nebula which outflow as a gas wind were less kinetically excited than the local outer space (cmbr). (Note: In the 1997 paper the researchers provide alternate quantities for the microwave background temperature of 3 K or 2.8 K. A more specific quantity of kelvin stated elsewhere of the microwave background is 2.72548 ± 0.00057 K.) Radiation transfer of cmbr into the CO parts (Note: This conclusion is reliant on previous modelling by Jura, Kahane, & Omont from 1988 and: Sahai from 1990 (Sahai & Nyman 1997 p.487 right column 2nd paragraph)) of the nebula wind indicated those parts only (Note: "We have discovered absorption of the 3 K microwave background radiation by ultracold CO gas in the Boomerang Nebula-losing mass through a fast (164 km s 1) molecular wind-This wind contains ultracold gas at temperatures below the microwave background temperature") must have a kelvin temperature state which is uniquely the least of any observed location in nature.

The kinetic energy (KE) of the CO outflow is theorized (Note: The theory uses a concept after Paczynski (1976) who used V471 Tauri) as the product of common-envelope evolution, which was a change in the outer environment (an envelope) of the dual orbital system of the binary system. The KE within the outflow is theorized as an environment forced out from the area of the orbital system of the larger star by the absorption of the lesser sized star into the core of the larger by terminal gravitational attraction. Cooling to sub cmbr temperature is by adiabatic expansion.

A succession of periodic observations from November 2011 (Atacama Large Millimeter Array) ending June 2012 (Australia Telescope Compact Array) with archived observations from Hubble (HST) (1998 & 2005) revealed other features. The nebula's visible double lobe was observed to be surrounded by a larger spherical region of cold gas seen only in sub-millimeter radio wavelengths. The nebula's outer fringes appear to be gradually warming.

As of mid-2017, it is believed that the star at the center of the nebula is a dying red giant.

== Gallery ==
=== ALMA (2017) ===
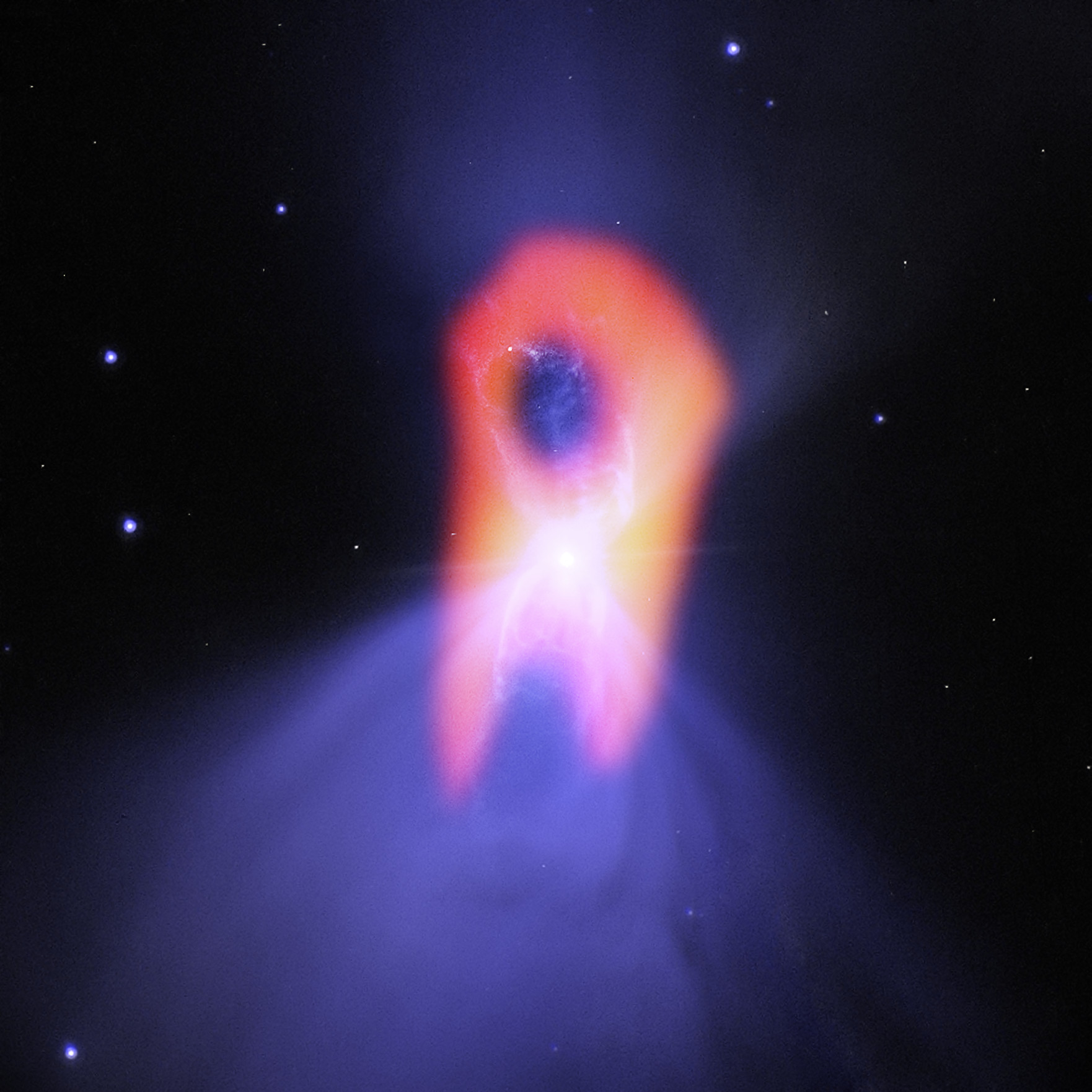

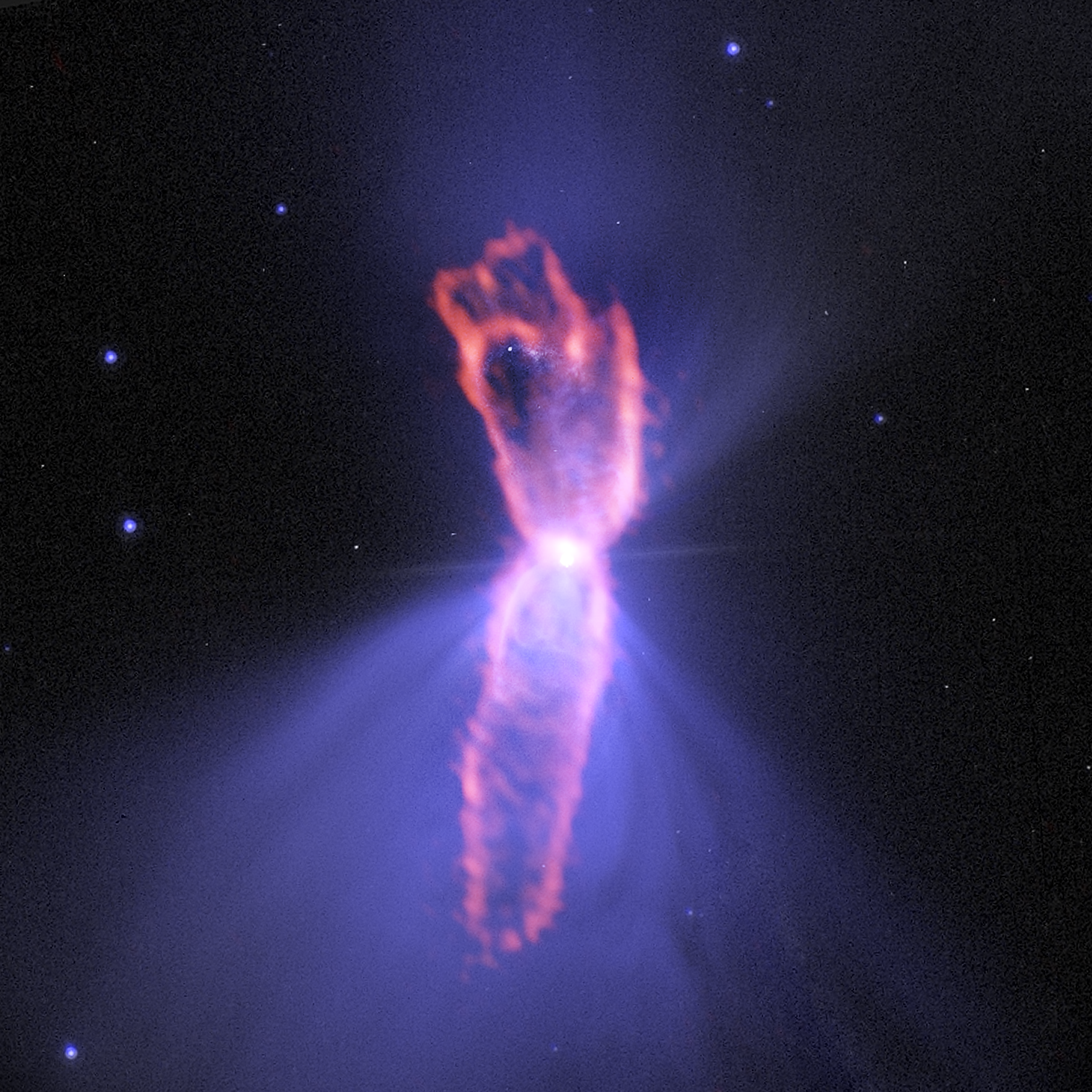

=== HST ===
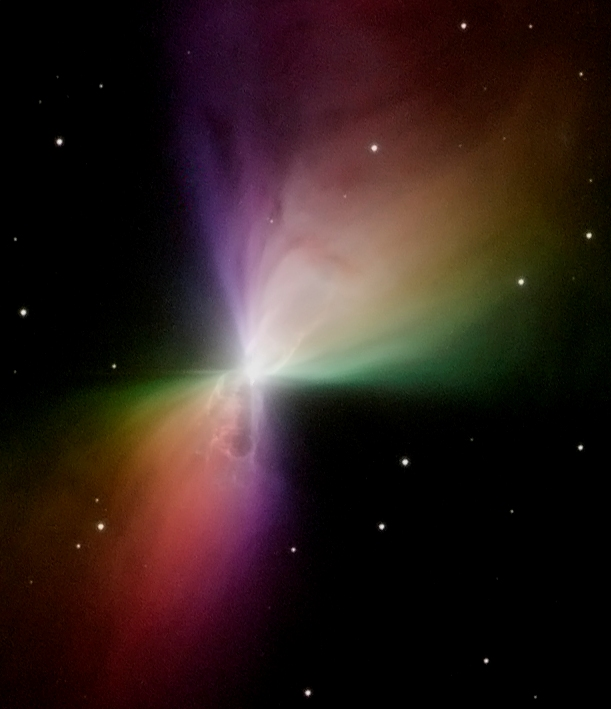
Imaged using polarizing filters (analogous to polarized sunglasses) and color-coded by the angle associated with the polarized light.

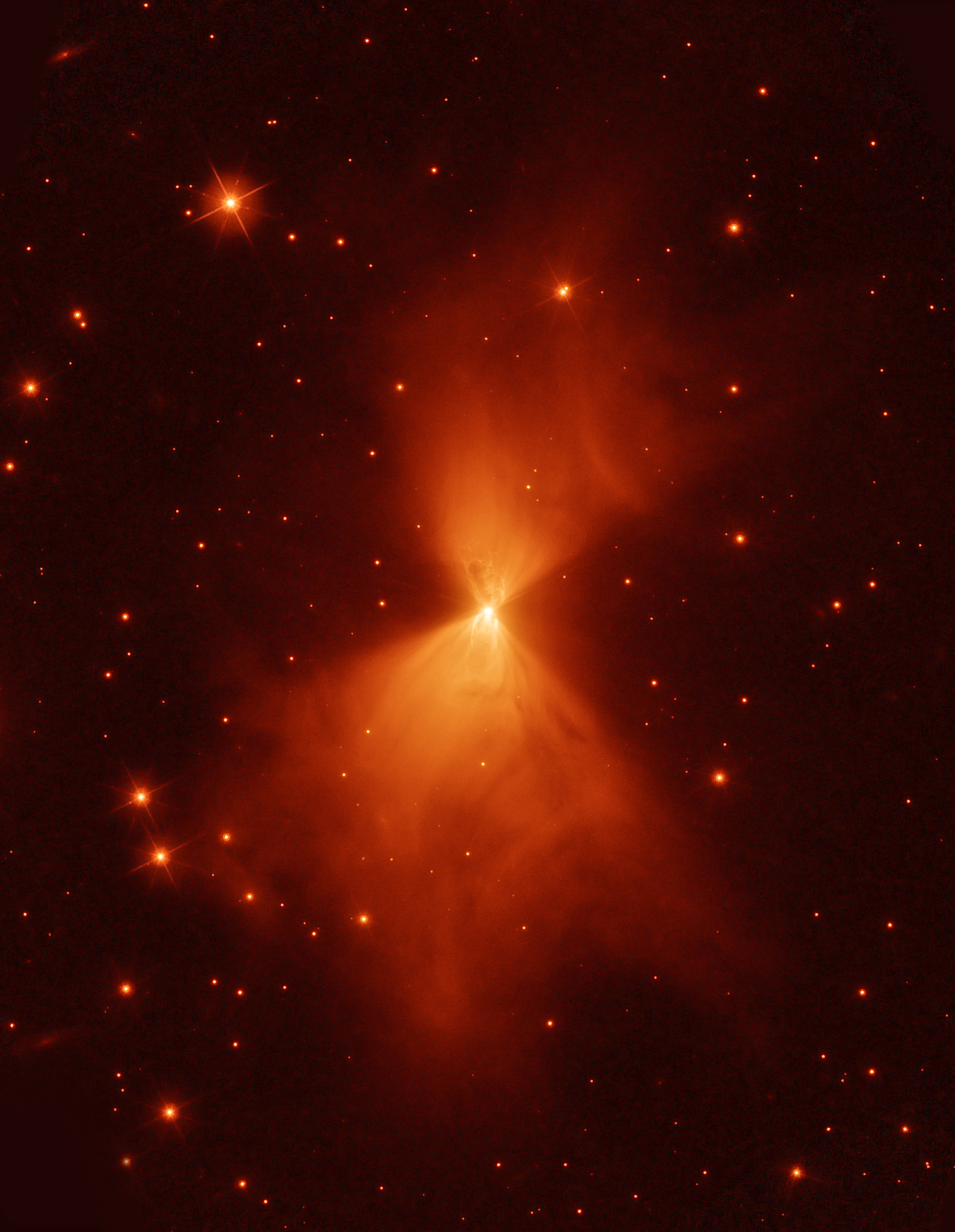
Red filter applied to monochromatic data
