= GJ 3634 b =

Super-Earth extrasolar planet

Discovery
- Discovered by: X. Bonfils et al.
- Discovery site: European Southern Observatory
- Discovery date: February 7, 2011
- Detection method: Radial velocity method

Orbital characteristics
- Semi-major axis: 0.0287 (± 0.0011) AU
- Eccentricity: 0.08
- Orbital period (sidereal): 2.64561 d
- Inclination: 59 ^{+18}_{−24}
- Star: GJ 3634

Physical characteristics
- Mass: 8.4+4.0 −1.5 M_{🜨}
- Temperature: 565 K (292 °C; 557 °F)

GJ 3634 b (sometimes Gliese 3634 b) is a super-Earth exoplanet in the orbit of the nearby red dwarf GJ 3634 at approximately 64.5 light-years in constellation Hydra. The planet is approximately eight times the mass of Earth, and orbits its star every two and a half days at a distance of 0.0287 AU. The planet was the first to be discovered by a group of astronomers searching for exoplanets in the orbit of very-low-mass stars after the team reorganized their strategy, choosing to search for targets that they could also confirm using the transit method. However, a transit event associated with GJ 3634 b was not detected. The planet's discovery was published in Astronomy and Astrophysics on February 8, 2011.

== Characteristics ==
=== Mass, radius and temperature ===
GJ 3634 b is estimated to be 8.4 times the mass of Earth, or 0.02 times the mass of Jupiter. Based on its mass, a radius of around 1.75 R_{🜨} is possible. It has an equilibrium temperature of 565 K (292 °C; 557 °F).

=== Host star ===
GJ 3634 is a M-class dwarf star, meaning that it is small, emits reddish light, and has a relatively low temperature for a star. The star is 0.45 times the mass of and 0.43 times the radius of the Sun. GJ 3634 is 0.020 times as luminous as the Sun, meaning that it radiates about 2% of the amount of energy that the Sun does. It was described as an intermediately active star in its discovery paper. GJ 3634 lies 19.8 parsecs (approximately 64.6 light years) away from Earth, a relatively close star. GJ 3634 b is the only planet to have been confirmed in the star's orbit, although initial analysis of the data suggests that a secondary body of an unknown nature may also exist, with an orbit of more than 200 days and a mass at least twice that of Neptune's.

The star was first catalogued in 1987, and was referenced on no more than five other occasions between its discovery and that of GJ 3634 b. It was included in the preliminary edition of the 3rd Gliese–Jahreiß catalogue, which documents stars within twenty parsecs of Earth.

GJ 3634 has an apparent magnitude of 11.95. It cannot be seen with the naked eye.

=== Orbit ===
The planet has a very short orbital period, and circles its host star every 2.64561 days at a distance of 0.0287 AU. GJ 3634 b has an eccentricity of 0.08, giving it a mostly circular orbit. In comparison, planet Mercury lies 0.387 AU from the Sun, orbits every 87.97 days, and has an orbital eccentricity of 0.2056.

== Discovery ==
GJ 3634 b was one of a sample of over 300 very-low-mass stars targeted by astronomers in search of planets that may orbit such stars. Using the High Accuracy Radial Velocity Planet Searcher (HARPS) at La Silla Observatory in Chile, six years of radial velocity data led the astronomers in the discovery of eleven other planets. After these discoveries, the astronomers chose to refocus their search on short-period planets, hoping to follow up after discoveries using the radial velocity method with a search for planets that also transited, or crossed in front of, their host stars as seen from Earth.

The search for GJ 3634 b started with a single exposure taken with HARPS on March 25, 2009. The results helped verify that GJ 3634 was an ideal target for a planet search using the radial velocity method (in which the gravitational pull of a planet on its star is measured by observing the resulting Doppler shift), as stellar activity would not overly mask or mimic Doppler spectroscopy measurements. It was also confirmed that GJ 3634 is neither a binary star nor a quickly rotating star, common false positives when searching for transiting planets. GJ 3634 was observed two weeks later for ten consecutive nights. Analysis of the resulting data found that the radial velocity variations most likely indicated the existence of a planet.

Having discovered the planet, the astronomers worked to discover a transit event using the Infrared Array Camera of the Spitzer Space Telescope, as ground-based observations could prove difficult if GJ 3634 b was a rocky planet. While the observations did not suggest that GJ 3634 b transited its star, a few orbital parameters were discovered, yielding the planet's true mass, which cannot be collected solely by radial velocity measurements.

The discovery of GJ 3634 b was reported in the journal Astronomy and Astrophysics on February 8, 2011. GJ 3634 b was the first planet discovered by the astronomers after adopting their new strategy, despite their failure to find a transit event for the planet.
