= GJ 3634 =

Star in the constellation Hydra

Observation data Epoch J2000 Equinox ICRS
- Constellation: Hydra
- Right ascension: 10^{h} 58^{m} 35.08837^{s}
- Declination: −31° 08′ 38.2008″
- Apparent magnitude (V): 11.95

Characteristics
- Evolutionary stage: Main sequence
- Spectral type: M2.5V

Astrometry
Radial velocity (R_{v})	4.93±0.26 km/s
Proper motion (μ)	RA: −566.980 mas/yr Dec.: −91.397 mas/yr
Parallax (π)	49.0331±0.0241 mas
Distance	66.52 ± 0.03 ly (20.39 ± 0.01 pc)

Details
Mass	0.45±0.05 M_{☉}
Radius	0.43±0.03 R_{☉}
Luminosity	0.02 L_{☉}
Metallicity [Fe/H]	+0.04±0.06 dex
Age	> 3 Gyr

Other designations
- LP 905-36; LHS 2335; 2MASS J10583513-3108382

Database references
SIMBAD	data
Exoplanet Archive	data
ARICNS	data

GJ 3634 (sometimes Gliese 3634) is a red dwarf star in the constellation Hydra. One planet has been discovered in its orbit, GJ 3634 b. GJ 3634 is under half the mass and size of the Sun, and is estimated to be at least a billion years younger, and lies near to Earth, with a distance of 66.5 light-years (20.4 parsecs). It was targeted by astronomers during an over six-year survey of red dwarfs. The astronomers had recently changed their strategy to search for planets with extremely short orbits so they could narrow down candidates that transited, or crossed in front of, their host stars as seen from the Earth. The super-Earth GJ 3634 b was the first planet discovered using this new strategy. The planet was confirmed using Doppler spectroscopy, or the observation and extrapolation of data from a recorded Doppler effect in the star's light, but later observations found no transiting pattern. The planet was published by its discoverers on February 8, 2011.

== Naming and discovery ==
GJ 3634 is named for its location in the Gliese Catalogue of Nearby Stars; a later expansion of the original catalogue was compiled jointly by Gliese and Hartmut Jahreiß. The Third Catalogue, the most recent catalogue, was formed to tag all then-known stars within 25 parsecs of Earth (81.54 light years). GJ 3634 was first catalogued in 1987. The discoverers of GJ 3634 b worked through the High Accuracy Radial Velocity Planet Searcher (HARPS) at the European Southern Observatory's La Silla Observatory in Chile for over six years in search of planets that orbited low-mass red dwarfs. After the discoveries of eleven prior planets, the researchers changed their strategy to search for planets with extremely short orbits. They would first discover the system using the radial velocity method, in which an observed Doppler shift in the star's light would be measured and interpreted; and would then follow up with a search for transits, in which the planet crosses in front of and dims its star as seen from Earth. Radial velocity measurements would help determine the most efficient and time-effective means of observing potential planetary transits.

Radial velocity measurements revealed the existence of a planet with a mass of at least 7 Earths. This planet, GJ 3634 b, became the first planet to be discovered under the new strategy. The team of astronomers then followed up with transit measurements using instruments on the Spitzer Space Telescope; they found that there was most likely no transit event present at the star, but they were able to discover its true mass. GJ 3634 b was published to the journal Astronomy and Astrophysics on February 8, 2011.

== Characteristics ==
GJ 3634 is an M-type red dwarf, a cool, small and dim star that shines with reddish light. It lies in the Hydra constellation. The star is 45% the mass of the Sun, and is 43% the Sun's size. GJ 3634, described by its discoverers as an "intermediately active star," has a luminosity of 0.02, meaning that it releases about 2% of the energy that the Sun radiates. The star is relatively metal-poor; with a metallicity of [Fe/H] -0.10, GJ 3634 has 79% the amount of iron that has been measured in the Sun. With an estimated age of more than three billion years, the star is similar in age to that of the Sun.

GJ 3634 has an apparent magnitude of 11.95. Thus, despite its relative proximity at 66.5 light-years (20.4 parsecs) away from the Earth, it cannot be seen with the unaided eye. The star is of a similar distance from Earth as planet-bearing 51 Pegasi, which lies at a distance of 50.6 light-years (15.5 parsecs).

== Planetary system ==
The GJ 3634 planetary system
Companion (in order from star)	Mass	Semimajor axis (AU)	Orbital period (days)	Eccentricity	Inclination (°)	Radius
b	8.4 ^{+4.0}_{−1.5} M_{🜨}	0.0287	2.64561	0.08	59^{+18}_{−24}	—
(unconfirmed)	>32 M_{🜨}	>0.6	>200	—	—	—

GJ 3634 has one confirmed planet in orbit: GJ 3634 b. The planet was called a super-Earth by its discoverers because of its mass, which was deduced to be 8.4 times that of Earth's and 0.02 times that of Jupiter's. GJ 3634 b has an extremely short orbital period, orbiting GJ 3634 every 2.64561 days. The planet orbits near to its star, and is at an average distance of 0.0287 AU away. It has an orbital eccentricity of 0.08, meaning that its orbit is very circular.

The initial study into the system suggests that a second planet in the inner system is unlikely. The discoverers of GJ 3634 b, however, noted the possible signal of a secondary body of an unknown nature that most likely orbits GJ 3634 with a period longer than 200 days and a mass that is at least double that of Neptune.
