= Pottasch =

Pottasch is a surname. Notable people with the surname include:

- Alan Pottasch (1927–2007), American advertising executive
- Stuart Pottasch (1932–2018), American astronomer

== See also ==
- 10431 Pottasch; see Meanings of minor planet names: 10001–11000#431
- Potash
