= Grenoble Observatory for Sciences of the Universe =

Astronomical observatory in France

Coordinates: 45.1942°N 5.7616°E

The Grenoble Observatory for Sciences of the Universe (OSUG) (French: Observatoires des sciences de l'Univers de Grenoble) is an astronomical observatory in France that is attached to CNRS-INSU and Grenoble Alpes University.

OSUG engages in scientific studies related to all aspects of the universe, the earth and environmental systems. The OSUG federates 1100 personals in 6 research Units, 5 Associated Research Teams and 2 joint service units federated, mostly located on the Saint-Martin d'Hères Campus near Grenoble.

OSUG was created on 26 November by governmental decree n° 85-1243.

== Research fields and Observation services ==
OSUG federates six research units (ISTerre, IPAG, IGE, LEGI, LECA, Irstea Grenoble), five associated research teams (FAME/ESRF, CEN/CNRM, Environnements/PACTE, SigmaPhy/Gipsa-Lab, LAME/LIPhy) and two joint service units (UMS OSUG, SAJF). OSUG engages in scientific studies in astrophysics, planetary science, geophysics, geology, climatology, hydrology, glaciology and ecology.

OSUG manages a number of key Observing systems, which contribute to national and international databases. Finally, OSUG, within the University of Grenoble, plays a major role in defining and running higher education programs and provides initial and continuing education in Earth Sciences, sciences of the Universe and environmental sciences.

== Outreach ==
In 2003, the OSUG created the planetary path of the Arboretum Robert Ruffier-Lanche on the university domain of Grenoble.

In 2010, at the request of the city of Grenoble, OSUG designed and illustrated a geological trail along the Saint-Laurent de la Bastille pedestrian climb.

The OSUG permanent exhibition, which highlights its geological collections and the scientific observations of the establishment since its beginnings, opened in 2016).

== Directors ==
- 2021 - : Nathalie Cotte
- 2016 - 2020: Michel Dietrich
- 2011 - 2015: Michel Fily
- 2007 - 2010: Henri-Claude Nataf
- 2002 - 2006: Jean-Pierre Gratier
- 1997 - 2001: Guy Perrier
- 1991 - 1996: Claude Bertout
- 1985 - 1990: Alain Omont
