= Stuart Pottasch =

American planetary nebulae researcher (1932–2018)

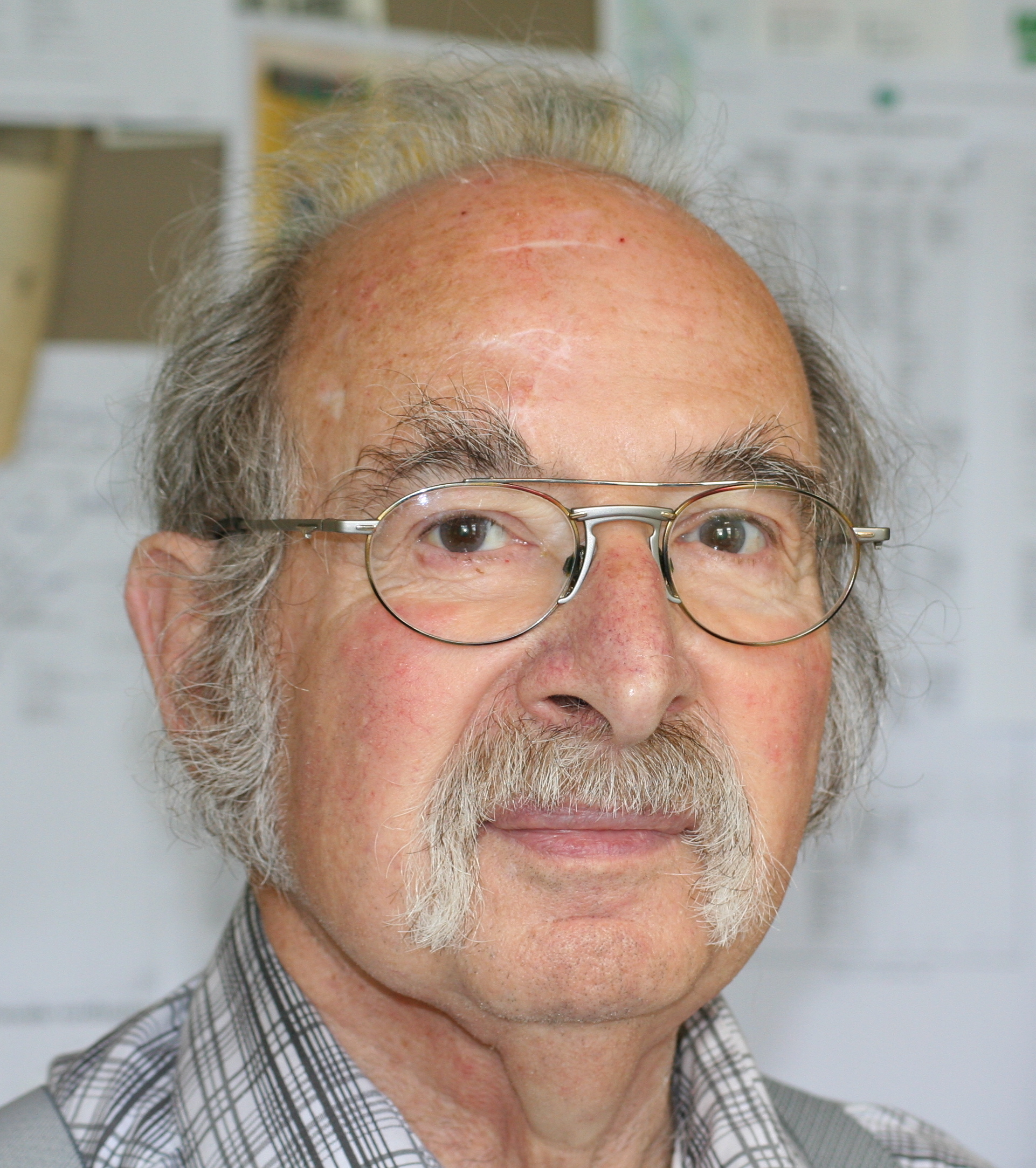
- Born: 16 January 1932; New York City
- Died: 4 April 2018 (aged 86); Groningen
- Alma mater: Cornell University; Harvard University; University of Colorado; University of Colorado Boulder
- Occupation: University teacher; astronomer
- Academic career
- Institutions: University of Groningen (1963–); National Institute of Standards and Technology; Paris Observatory; Princeton University; Institute for Advanced Study; Indiana University
- Thesis: The Novae Outburst
- Doctoral advisor: Richard Nelson Thomas

Stuart Pottasch (16 January 1932 – 4 April 2018) was a professor at the University of Groningen and a researcher of planetary nebulae.

== Personal life ==
Pottasch was born in New York City on 16 January 1932 to Max and Juliette Pottasch. His father Max was born 11 August 1894 in Germany, and arrived in the US in 1921; his mother was born in NYC in 1906. Pottasch had a sister, Suzanne, also born in 1932. Stuart assembled one of the largest collections of cacti in the Netherlands, as well as keeping and breeding parrots.

He married Anna Maria de Groot, whom he met on his first visit to Leiden. They had three children; a daughter and two sons. Anna Maria died in 1989, after which he married Greet Mientjes and moved to an isolated farm house in Tolbert, Leek, Netherlands.

He died in Groningen on 4 April 2018 after a long illness.

== Education and research ==
He received a bachelor's degree in Engineering Physics from Cornell University in 1954. He was in Leiden for 1955, before going to Harvard University, where he received a master's degree in 1957. His dissertation on "The Novae Outburst", supervised by R.N. Thomas, resulted in a PhD from the University of Colorado in 1958. He was subsequently employed as a postdoc at the National Bureau of Standards, the Paris Observatory in 1959–60, Princeton University in 1960–62 (assistant professorship), at the Institute for Advanced Study, and Indiana University (1962–63).

He became a Professor of Astrophysics at the Kapteyn Astronomical Institute of the University of Groningen from 1963, a position he was offered by Adriaan Blaauw. He was Chairman of the Department of Astronomy in 1969–1982. He retired with a pension in 1997, and he was subsequently an Emeritus Professor.

His main research focus was planetary nebulae, about which he wrote a textbook. He published around 400 papers, which received over 10,000 citations during his lifetime. He also discovered a planetary nebula, which was later given the name of Po 1.

He was editor-in-chief of the Bulletin of the Astronomical Institutes of the Netherlands from 1963 until 1969, when the journal merged with other national journals to become the Astronomy and Astrophysics journal; he was subsequently an editor of that journal until 1976, when he transitioned to editing the 'Letters' edition of the journal, a role he kept until 1998, while also being an editor of The Astronomy and Astrophysics Review from 1990 until 1999.

He supervised 22 PhD students, including Harm Habing, Klaas de Boer and Jacqueline van Gorkom.

He was a member of Academia Europaea from 1989.
