= Klaas de Boer (astronomer) =

Dutch astronomer (1941 – 2022)

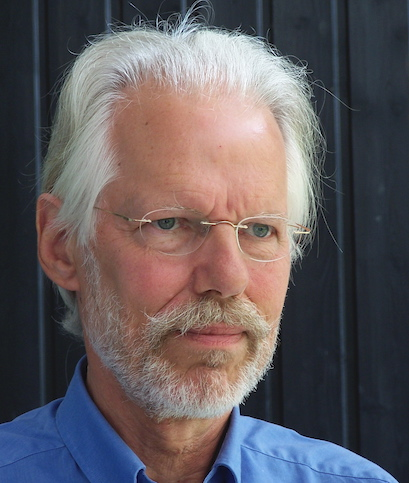
- Klaas de Boer, ca. 2007
- Born: 16 November 1941; Groningen, Netherlands
- Died: 15 March 2022 (aged 80); Groningen, Netherlands
- Scientific career
- Fields: Astronomy

Klaas Sjoerds de Boer (16 November 1941 – 15 March 2022) was a Dutch astronomer and astrophysicist as well as Professor at the University of Bonn. His research mainly consisted of using data obtained with satellites and from Earth bound telescopes.

== Education ==
De Boer studied astronomy and physics at the University of Groningen and obtained his PhD there along with Stuart Pottasch on Interstellar Absorption Lines in the Ultraviolet.

== Research and teaching career ==
From 1974 to 1977 he was at the Institute for Space Research at the University of Groningen. From 1978 to 1981 he was a research associate at the Astronomy Department of the University of Wisconsin (USA) in Madison. Between 1981 and 1985 he was postdoc at the University of Tübingen and worked in 1985 for the University of Groningen in the collaborative project of the Netherlands and the United Kingdom of the observatory on La Palma, being based at Royal Greenwich Observatory in Herstmonceux. Research periods brought him to the Astronomy Department of the Princeton University (USA) und and the University of Canterbury in Christchurch (New Zealand).

He became 1986 full Professor of Astronomie at the Sternwarte of the University of Bonn, successor of Hans Schmidt.

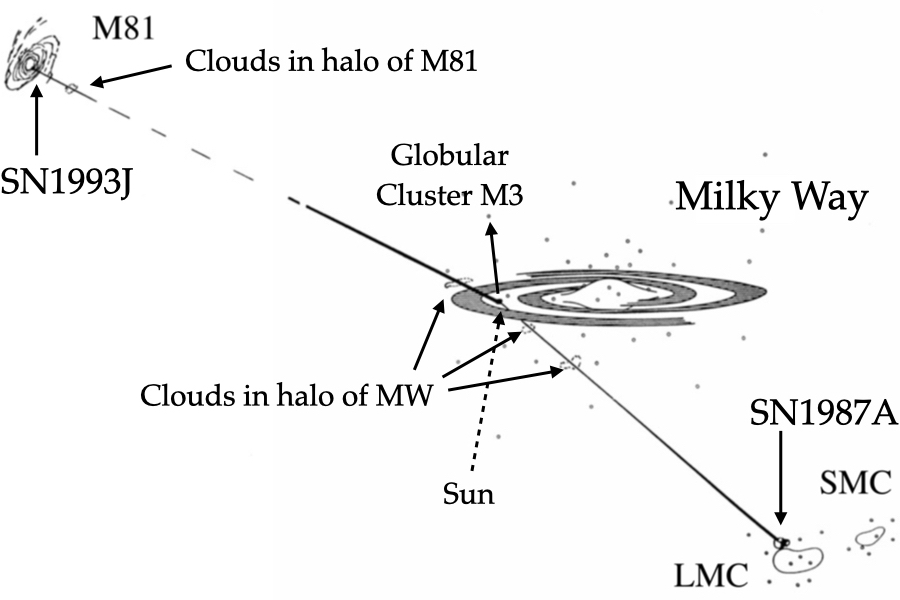
Using Supernovae to probe gas outside our Galaxy

He authored or co-authored over 250 publications, half in refereed journals. He organised conferences and was editor of proceedings and published books. In addition, he wrote over 25 popular articles and some 30 essays for the internet.

=== Committees ===
De Boer was Member and chairman of several committees, among them International Ultraviolet Explorer Programme Committee of the ESA (1986–1994), of the Gutachterausschusses Verbundforschung Astronomie und Astrophysik of the DLR (1991–1993 and 1995–2001), the Science Advisory Group of Gaia-Project (1998–2000) and of the Board of Directors of the international journal Astronomy & Astrophysics (2001–2011).

He worked with his colleagues in Bonn toward a merger, in 2005, of the Sternwarte sich 2006 with Radioastronomischen Institut and the Institut für Astrophysik und extraterrestrische Forschung to form the Argelander Institute for Astronomy.
