= Thierry Forveille =

French astronomer

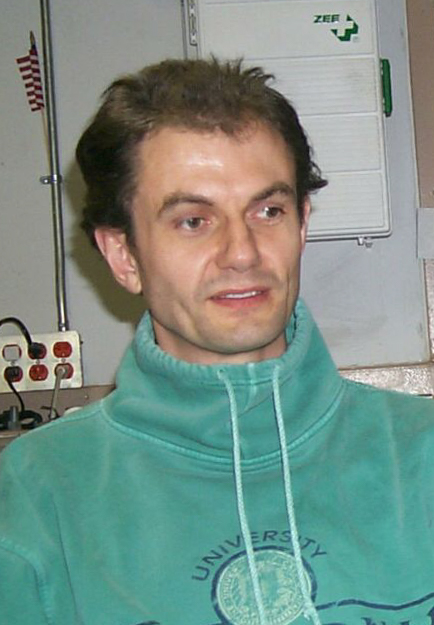
- Thierry Forveille in 2000 at the Infrared Optical Telescope Array
- Born: July 11, 1961 (age 65); Sétif, French Algeria
- Education: Université Grenoble-Alpes
- Known for: Research on brown dwarfs and exosolar planets. Editor-in-chief of Astronomy & Astrophysics
- Scientific career
- Workplaces: Grenoble Planetology and Astrophysics Institute

Thierry Forveille, (born on July 11, 1961) in Sétif (then in French Algeria), is a French astronomer working at the Grenoble Planetology and Astrophysics Institute (part of the Observatoire des Sciences de l'Univers de Grenoble) and the editor-in-chief of the journal Astronomy & Astrophysics.

A former student of École Normale Supérieure, Thierry Forveille obtained his PhD in physics in 1988 at the Joseph-Fourier University (which later merged into University of Grenoble-Alpes) with a thesis entitled Millimetric observations of circumstellar matter around young stellar objects and advanced stars under the direction of Stéphane Guilloteau. He has been an astronomer in the astronomy group of the Grenoble observatory (now Grenoble Institute of planetology and astrophysics) since 1988, interrupted by a 2000-2006 stay at the Canada France Hawaii Telescope. His career is marked by numerous international collaborations.

He became editor-in-chief of the journal Astronomy & Astrophysics in 2012.

His main current research areas are the observational studies of brown dwarfs and extrasolar planets.

== Selected publications ==
The selection criterion for bibliographic references quoted in this section is the number of normalized citations, i.e., the total number of citations divided by the number of authors signing the publication, as given by the Astrophysics Data System at the date of writing.

- Loup, C.; Forveille, T.; Omont, A., A.; Paul, J. F (1993). "CO and HCN observations of circumstellar envelopes. A catalogue - mass loss rates and distributions". Astronomy and Astrophysics Supplement Series. 99: 291–377. Bibcode:1993A&AS...99..291L – via Astrophysics Data System.
- Zuckerman, B.; Forveille, T.; Kastner, J. H. (1995). "Inhibition of giant-planet formation by rapid gas depletion around young stars". Nature. 373 (6514): 494–496. Bibcode:1995Natur.373..494Z. doi:10.1038/373494a0. ISSN 0028-0836. PMID 7845460. S2CID 4345468.
- Delfosse, X.; Forveille, T.; Perrier, C.; Mayor, M. (1998). "Rotation and chromospheric activity in field M dwarfs". Astronomy & Astrophysics. 331: 581. Bibcode:1998A&A...331..581D – via Astrophysics Data System.
- Kastner, J. H.; Zuckerman, B.; Weintraub, D. A.; Forveille, T. (1997-07-04). "X-ray and Molecular Emission from the Nearest Region of Recent Star Formation". Science. 277 (5322): 67–71. Bibcode:1997Sci...277...67K. doi:10.1126/science.277.5322.67. ISSN 0036-8075. PMID 9204898.
- Delfosse, X.; Forveille, T.; Ségransan, D.; Beuzit, J. -L; Udry, S.; Perrier, C.; Mayor, M. (2000). "Accurate masses of very low mass stars: IV Improved mass-luminosity relations". Astronomy and Astrophysics. 364: 217. arXiv:astro-ph/0010586. Bibcode:2000A&A...364..217D.
