= Hôtel de Ville, Saint-Martin-d'Hères =

Town hall in Saint-Martin-d'Hères, France

Hôtel de Ville
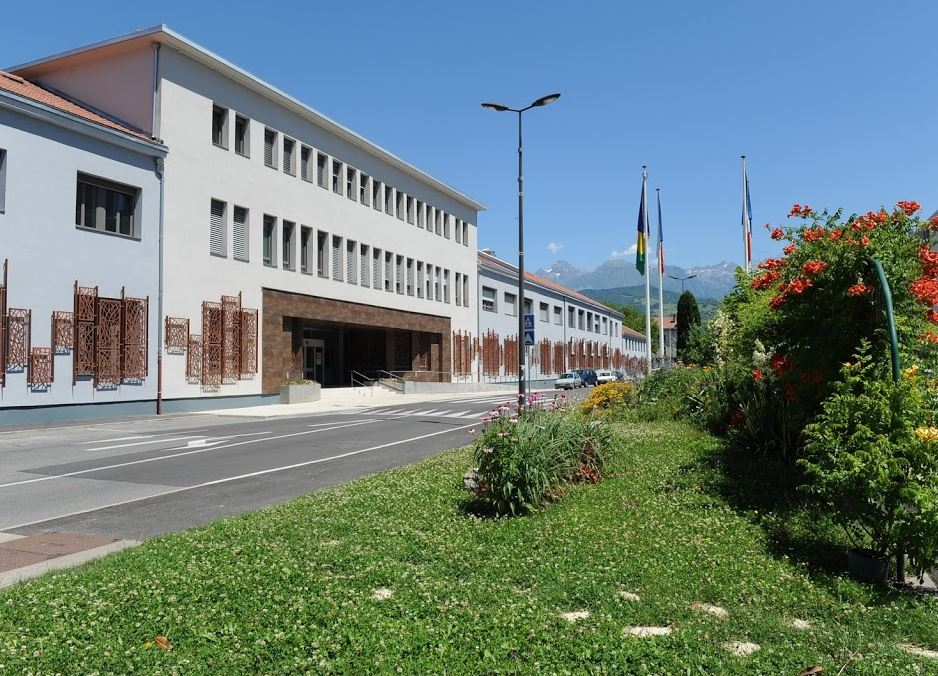
- The main frontage of the Hôtel de Ville in July 2015
- Interactive map of the Hôtel de Ville area

General information
- Type: City hall
- Architectural style: Modern style
- Location: Saint-Martin-d'Hères, France
- Coordinates: 45.1837°N 5.7552°E
- Completed: 1981

The Hôtel de Ville (French pronunciation: [otɛl də vil], City Hall) is a municipal building in Saint-Martin-d'Hères, Isère, in southeastern France, standing on Rue Ambroise Croizat.

== History ==
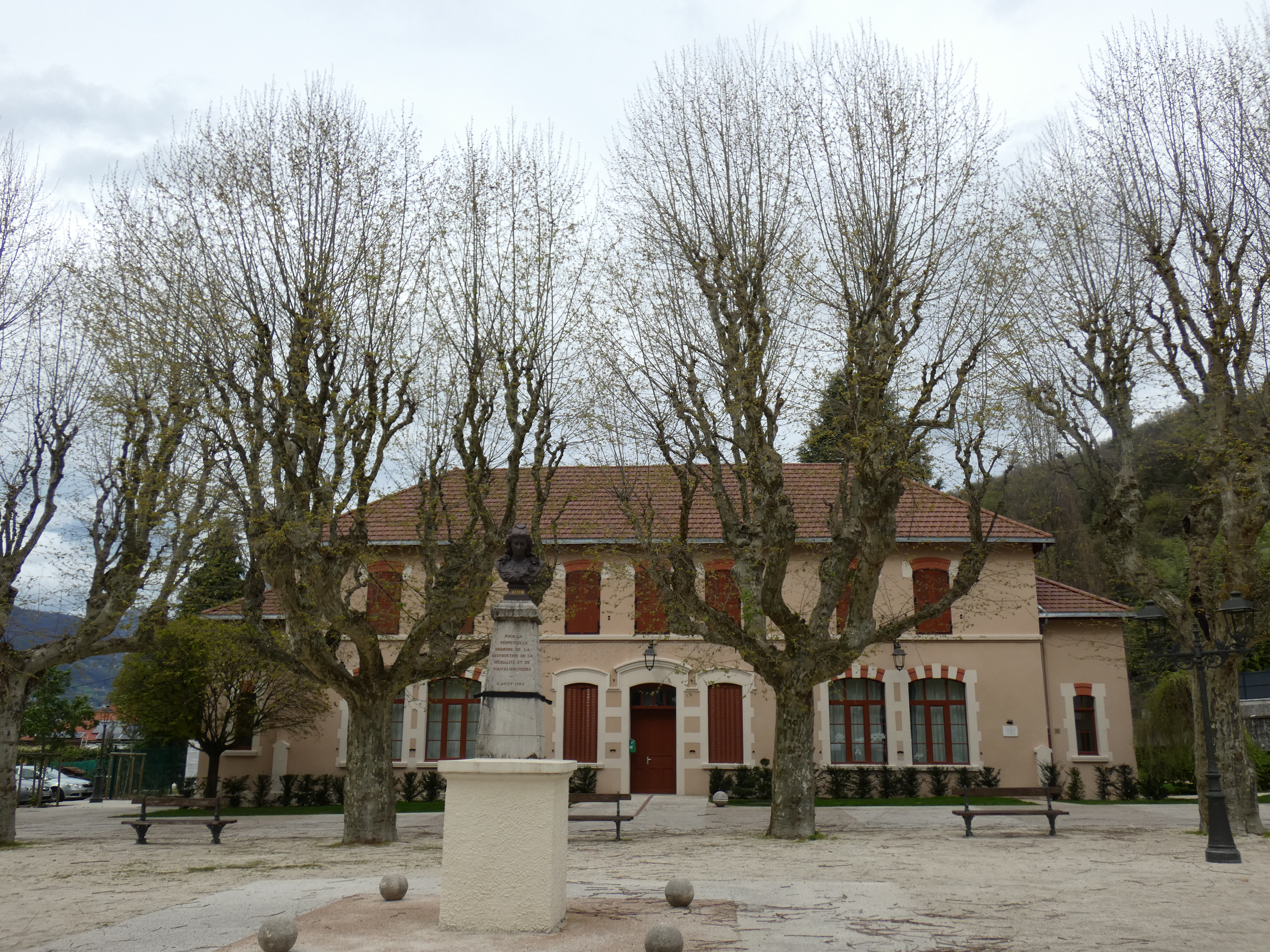
The old town hall

Following the French Revolution, the town council initially met at the home of the mayor at the time. This arrangement continued until the mid-19th century, when the council decided to commission a combined town hall and school. The site they selected was on the north side of the new town square (now Place de la Liberté). The new building was designed in the neoclassical style and built in brick with a stucco finish. A bust of Marianne was installed in front of the town hall and the square, town hall and school were officially opened to the public on 14 July 1880.

The design of the building involved a symmetrical main frontage of seven bays facing onto the square. The central bay featured a segmental headed doorway with a stone surround and a hood mould, closely flanked by a pair of segmental headed windows with stone surrounds and hood moulds. The other bays on the ground floor were fenestrated by segmental headed windows with stone surrounds and voussoirs, while the first floor was fenestrated by segmental headed windows with terracotta hood moulds. The Church of Saint-Martin was erected just behind the old town hall, a decade later, in 1890.

In the 1970s, after finding the old town hall cramped, the council led by the mayor, Étienne Grappe, decided to acquire a new town hall. The building they selected, on Rue Ambroise Croizat, was the old administration block of an industrial business known as Neyrpic. The business was established by Casimir Brenier as an engineering workshop in La Tronche in 1854.

After Brenier recruited his son-in-law André Neyret in 1879, the business became Brenier & Neyret and, following the recruitment of a mining engineer, Charles Beylier, in 1896, it became Neyret-Beylier. The administration block was erected shortly after the business relocated to Saint-Martin-d'Hères in 1900. By then it was manufacturing a range of hydraulic equipment, electrical equipment and cable cars. In 1917, it transferred the business into a joint venture with a Swiss automobile company, Piccard-Pictet, thereby creating Neyret-Beylier & Piccard-Pictet, later shortened to Neyrpic. The factory in Saint-Martin-d'Hères was closed in 1966, and what remained of the business was sold to Alstom in 1967.

The administration block, along with the rest of the factory, remained abandoned and derelict until the council acquired it in 1981. A major programme of conversion works was initiated to convert the building for municipal use as the "Maison Communale". The design involved a symmetrical main frontage of 19 bays facing onto Rue Ambroise Croizat. There was a wide opening containing a doorway on the ground floor, and the first and second floors were fenestrated by a series of closely-set casement windows. Internally, the principal rooms created included the Salle du Conseil (council chamber). A project to redevelop the rest of the former factory site for residential, commercial and leisure use, started in late 2021, and culminated in the opening of a shopping mall in October 2024.
