= Arboretum Robert Ruffier-Lanche =

Arboretum in Rhône-Alpes, France

Coordinates: 45°11′39″N 5°46′40″E

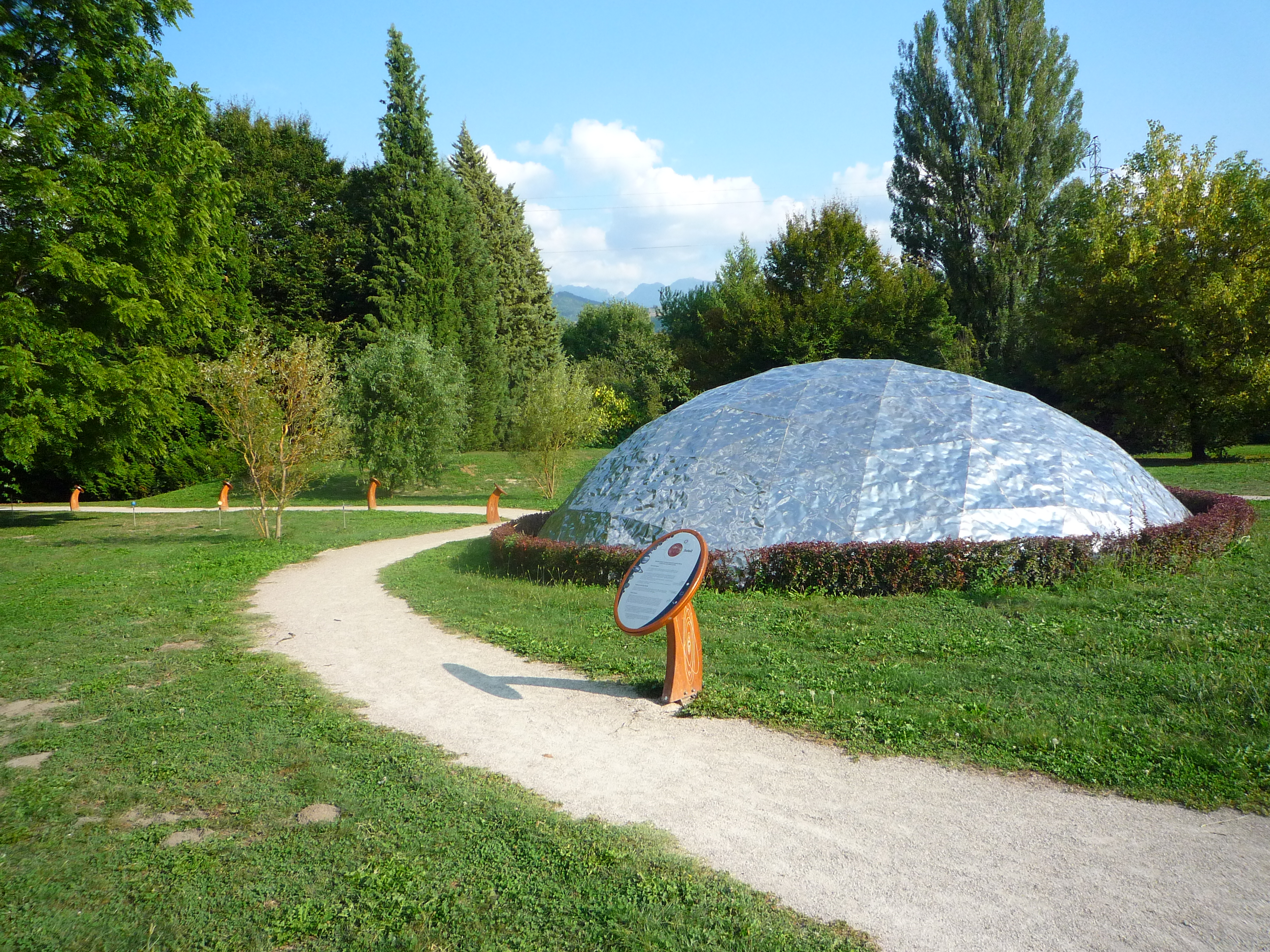
Manuel Forestini planetary path in the Robert Ruffier-Lanche arboretum in Saint-Martin-d'Hères.

The Arboretum Robert Ruffier-Lanche (3 hectare) is an arboretum located on the campus of the Université Grenoble Alpes at 2233 rue de la Piscine, Saint-Martin-d'Hères, Isère, Rhône-Alpes, France. It is open daily without charge.

The arboretum was created in 1966 beside the Isère by Robert Ruffier-Lanche, head gardener of the Jardin botanique alpin du Lautaret. After some years of neglect, its restoration began in 1999. Today the arboretum contains over 200 species of trees and shrubs from temperate environments around the world, including particularly fine specimens of Davidia involucrata, Paulownia tomentosa var tsinlingensis, and Quercus rugosa.

It also contains a scaled model representation of the Solar System.

== See also ==
- List of botanical gardens in France
