= Renée C. Kraan-Korteweg =

Dutch-South African astronomer

Prof. em. Renée C. Kraan-Korteweg MSc PhD MASSAf FRSSAf
- Born: 7 May 1954 (age 72); Amsterdam
- Education: University of Basel
- Spouse: Pieter Kraan
- Scientific career
- Workplaces: Universidad de Guanajuato; University of Cape Town
- Doctoral advisor: Gustav Andreas Tammann

Renée C. Kraan-Korteweg (born 1954) is a Dutch-South African scientist.

She is head of the University of Cape Town department of astronomy and founder and co-director of the Astrophysics, Cosmology and Gravity Centre. She serves as vice president of the executive committee of the International Astronomical Union and is a member of the Academy of Science of South Africa.

== Education and work experience ==
Kraan-Korteweg graduated from the Gymnasium Münchenstein in Switzerland in 1972. She attained an MSc (Physics and Mathematics) from the Universität Basel in 1978 and a PhD in Astronomy in 1985. This was followed by a 6-year research fellowship at the University of Basel, a 3-year fellowship of the Royal Dutch Academy of Science (KNAW) at the Rijksuniversiteit Groningen and a 3-year European Community fellowship at the Observatoire de Paris-Meudon.

In 1997 she was appointed a professor at the Universidad de Guanajuato in Mexico, where she stayed for 7 years. She became head of the Astronomy department of the university in 2002.

Kraan-Korteweg was appointed Vice-President of the International Astronomical Union in 2012 and served in that position until August 2018.

She served as the head of the Astronomy department at the University of Cape Town from 2005. In 2009 Kraan-Korteweg founded and remains co-director of the Astrophysics, Gravity and Cosmology Research Centre at the university.

In 2013 she became a member of the Astronomy Advisory Council of the National Research Foundation (NRF) and is chair of the council.

== Research interests ==
Her research interests include the large-scale structure of the Cosmos and streaming motions in the nearby universe. She conducts research with the South African Large Telescope (SALT), searching for black holes in the centre of dwarf elliptical galaxies and calculating the dark matter content of low-surface-brightness galaxies. She participated in the Parkes HI Zone of Avoidance Survey, which used the Parkes 60m Radio Telescope to discover nearby galaxies previously "hidden" by the Great Attractor.

== Awards and recognition ==
In 2018 she won the Minister’s Special Award in the field of astronomy at the South African Women in Science Awards (SAWISA) 2018, in recognition of her “outstanding contribution to building South Africa’s scientific and research knowledge base in advancing the field of astronomy”.

In 2006 the NRF awarded Kraan-Korteweg NRF Rating B and has reaffirmed that rating subsequently.

In 2011 she was 2nd runner-up, Distinguished Women in Life, Natural and Engineering Science Department of Science and Technology Women in Science Award.
