= Green Catalogue of Supernova Remnants =

The Green Catalogue of Supernova Remnants lists supernova remnants (SNR) within the Milky Way Galaxy. The catalogue was created in 1984 by Dave Green of Cavendish Laboratory, University of Cambridge. The latest update is the Oct 2024 version, which lists 310 SNRs.
