= Saint-Martin-d'Hères =

- Commune
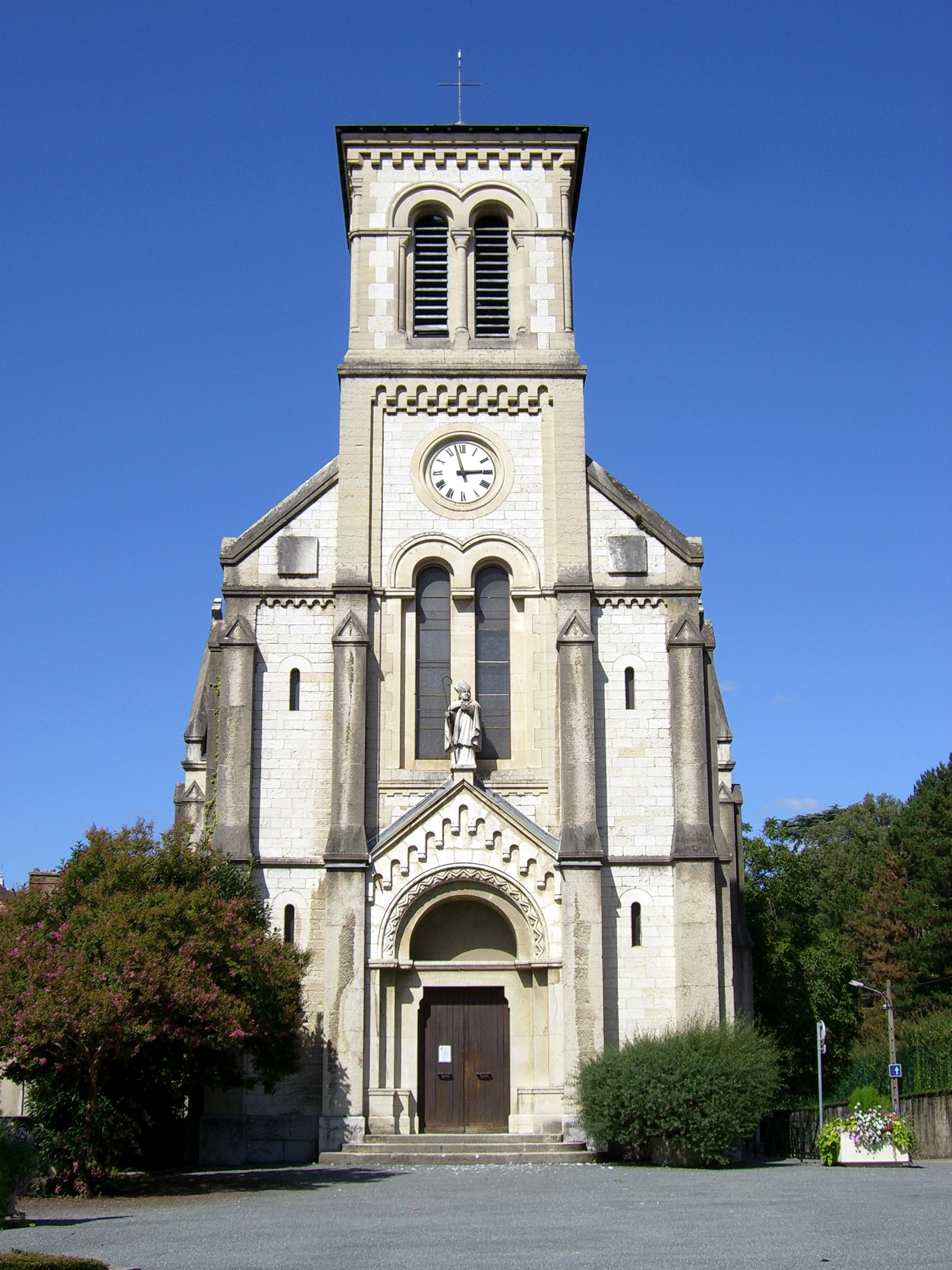
- The church of Saint-Martin

- Flag Coat of arms
- Location of Saint-Martin-d'Hères
- Location within France Location within Auvergne-Rhône-Alpes
- Coordinates: 45°10′02″N 5°45′55″E
- Country: France
- Region: Auvergne-Rhône-Alpes
- Department: Isère
- Arrondissement: Grenoble
- Canton: Saint-Martin-d'Hères
- Intercommunality: Grenoble-Alpes Métropole

Government
  - Mayor (2020–2026): David Queiros
- Area^{1}: 9.26 km^{2} (3.58 sq mi)
- Elevation: 234 m (768 ft)
- Highest elevation: 610 m (2,000 ft)
- Lowest elevation: 206 m (676 ft)
- Population (2023): 37,695
  - Density: 4,070/km^{2} (10,500/sq mi)
- Time zone: UTC+01:00 (CET)
  - Summer (DST): UTC+02:00 (CEST)
- INSEE/Postal code: 38421 /38400
- ^{1} French Land Register data, which excludes lakes, ponds, glaciers > 1 km^{2} (0.386 sq mi or 247 acres) and river estuaries.

Saint-Martin-d'Hères (French pronunciation: [sɛ̃ maʁtɛ̃ dɛʁ]; Arpitan: Sant-Martin-d’Èra) is a commune in the Isère department in southeastern France. Part of the Grenoble urban unit (agglomeration), it is the largest suburb of the city of Grenoble and is adjacent to it on the east.

== History ==
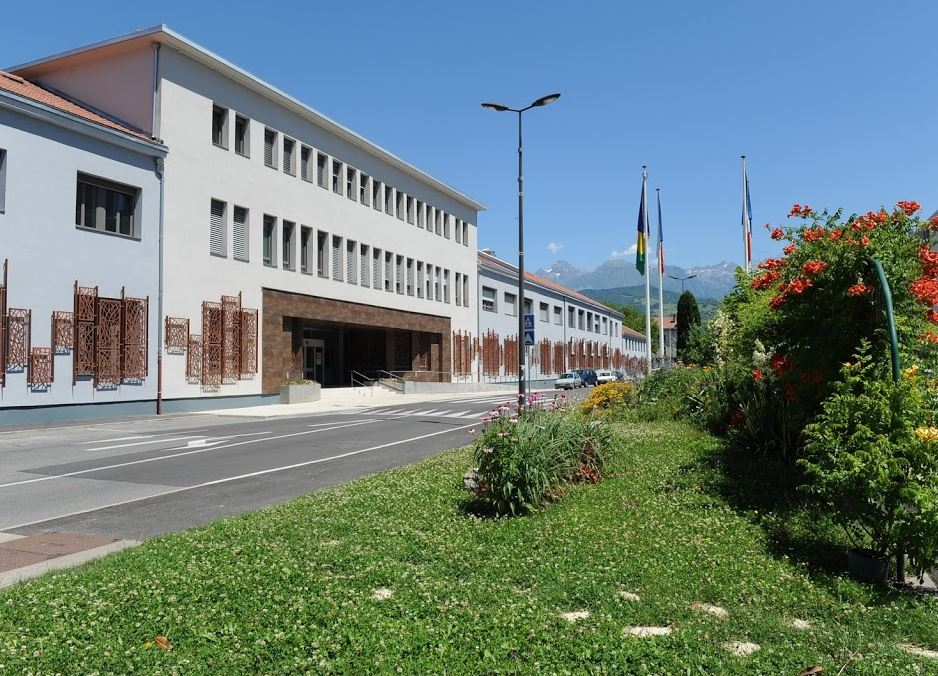
The Hôtel de Ville

The commune was created around 1100 where the church of St. Martin was located. During the Middle Ages it was administered at some points by the lords of the Castle of Gières, and at other times by the bishop of Grenoble, who had religious and seigniorial disputes with the former. The city remained a mostly rural area, until the 19th century, when it saw its first industrial developments with the opening of roads and railways. In the 1950s and the 1960s the city saw a "new era" with a significant demographic expansion caused by the installation of the University of Grenoble.

The city is limited at the north by the Isère. It is located in an area historically prone to flooding by it and by the Mogne and Sonnant streams, though the floods stopped since the construction of dykes and the channelization of the Mogne and Sonnant streams.

The Hôtel de Ville is a former factory which was converted in 1981.

== Population ==
Historical population

Year	Pop.	±% p.a.
1793	618	—
1800	771	+3.21%
1806	616	−3.67%
1821	760	+1.41%
1831	726	−0.46%
1836	825	+2.59%
1841	1,107	+6.06%
1846	1,078	−0.53%
1851	1,040	−0.72%
1856	1,070	+0.57%
1861	1,066	−0.07%
1866	1,280	+3.73%
1872	1,325	+0.58%
1876	1,470	+2.63%
1881	1,546	+1.01%
1886	1,710	+2.04%
1891	1,641	−0.82%
1896	1,781	+1.65%
1901	1,776	−0.06%

Year	Pop.	±% p.a.
1906	1,874	+1.08%
1911	1,988	+1.19%
1921	2,508	+2.35%
1926	3,256	+5.36%
1931	4,656	+7.42%
1936	5,633	+3.88%
1946	5,944	+0.54%
1954	6,839	+1.77%
1962	14,453	+9.80%
1968	33,605	+15.10%
1975	38,052	+1.79%
1982	35,188	−1.11%
1990	34,341	−0.30%
1999	35,777	+0.46%
2007	35,502	−0.10%
2012	38,105	+1.43%
2017	38,487	+0.20%
2023	37,695	−0.35%

Source: EHESS and INSEE (1968-2023)

== Education ==
Saint-Martin-d'Hères is the home of the Université Grenoble Alpes main campus "Domaine Universitaire de Grenoble", a center of higher education in the region. The university features the Centre universitaire d'études françaises (CUEF). The CUEF offers second language instruction in French, and attracts students from a variety of foreign countries. Several universities in the United States sponsor study-abroad programs affiliated with the CUEF.

== Notable people ==
- Chloé Aurard, ice hockey player
- Cristobal Huet, ice hockey player
- Alexandre Texier, ice hockey player
- Suzanne Balguerie, soprano; died here
- Yoann Bonato, rally driver
- Aurélien Panis, racing driver
- Tristan Vautier, racing driver
- Olivier Véran, politician

== Sights ==
- Arboretum Robert Ruffier-Lanche

== See also ==
- Communes of the Isère department
