= Harm Habing =

Dutch astronomer (born 1937)

Harm Jan Habing
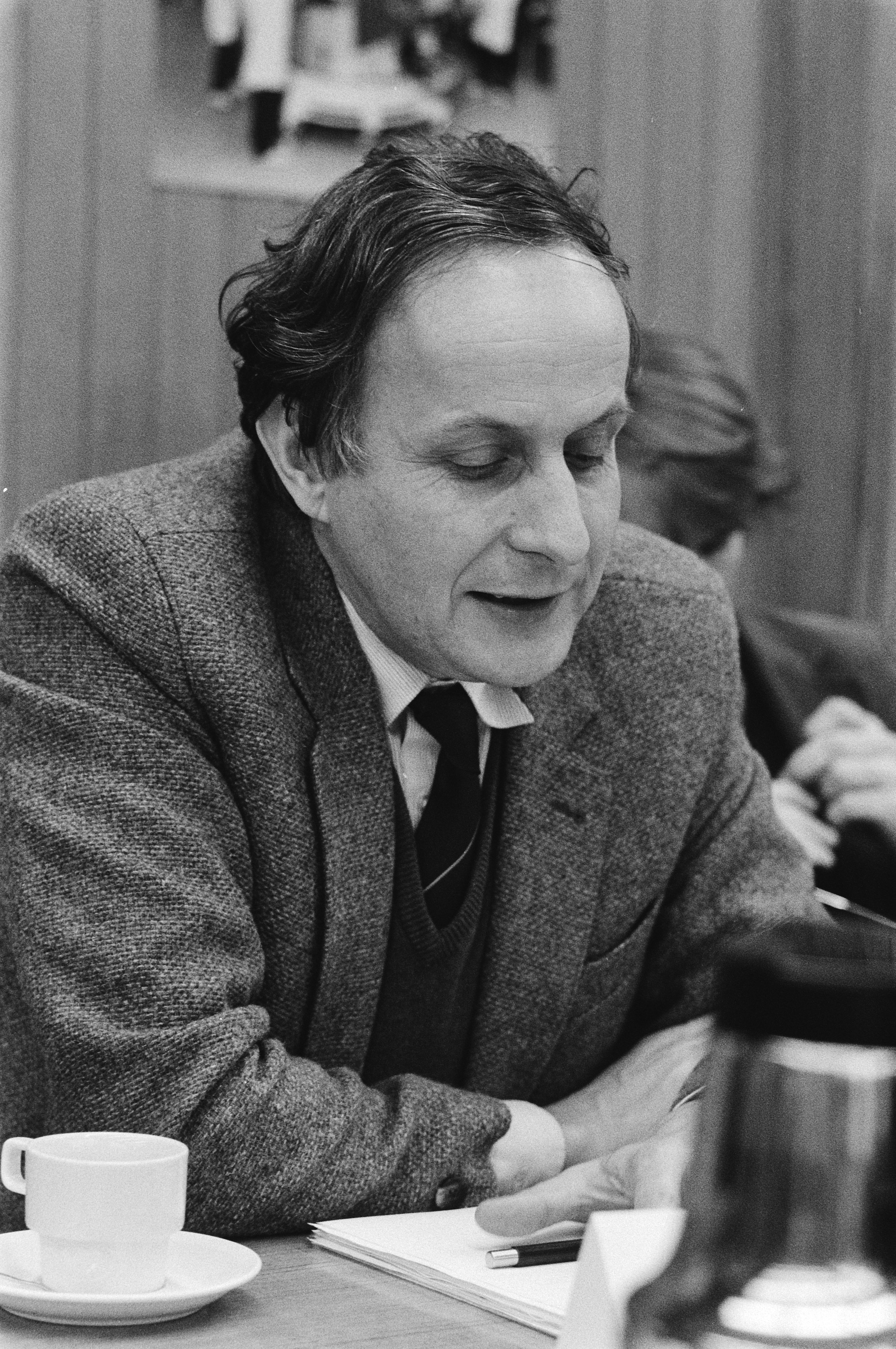
- Harm Habing in 1983
- Born: August 31, 1937 (age 89); Tubbergen, Overijssel, Netherlands
- Occupation: Professor of Astrophysics (emeritus)

Academic background
- Education: Groningen University

Academic work
- Discipline: Astronomer
- Institutions: Leiden University

Harm Jan Habing (born 31 October 1937 in Tubbergen, Overijssel, Netherlands) is a Dutch astronomer and emeritus professor of astrophysics at Leiden University.

== Career ==
Habing studied at the University of Groningen, first chemistry and physics, after which he switched to astronomy. He obtained his doctorate in Groningen in 1968 with a thesis entitled "Studies of physical conditions in HI regions" supervised by Stuart Robert Pottasch and Hendrik Christoffel van de Hulst.

In 1971 Habing was appointed lecturer in astrophysics at Leiden University and in 1979 he was promoted to full professor. He was director of Leiden Observatory in the 80's and 90's. He has been emeritus professor since 2003.

Ewine van Dishoeck, Xander Tielens, Peter Jenniskens and Huib Jan van Langevelde were among Harm Habing's PhD students.

Harm Habing was Editor-in-Chief of Astronomy & Astrophysics from 1996 to 2002.

After his retirement, Habing wrote several books, including about the history of astronomy.

== Research ==
Habing is known for his 1968 research into the far-ultraviolet (between 91 and 240 nanometers) radiation field in the space between the stars.

Later at the Leiden Observatory, his interests included masers, late stages of stellar evolution (such as OH/IR stars), and star formation.

Habing was principal investigator of the Infrared Astronomical Satellite (IRAS), which was launched in 1983 and has enabled many discoveries in the field of infrared astronomy. In 1988, Habing received the Gilles Holst Medal.

== Things named after Habing ==
- Habing field, a measure of the interstellar radiation field.
- (5037) Habing, asteroïd.
