= Astronomy & Astrophysics =

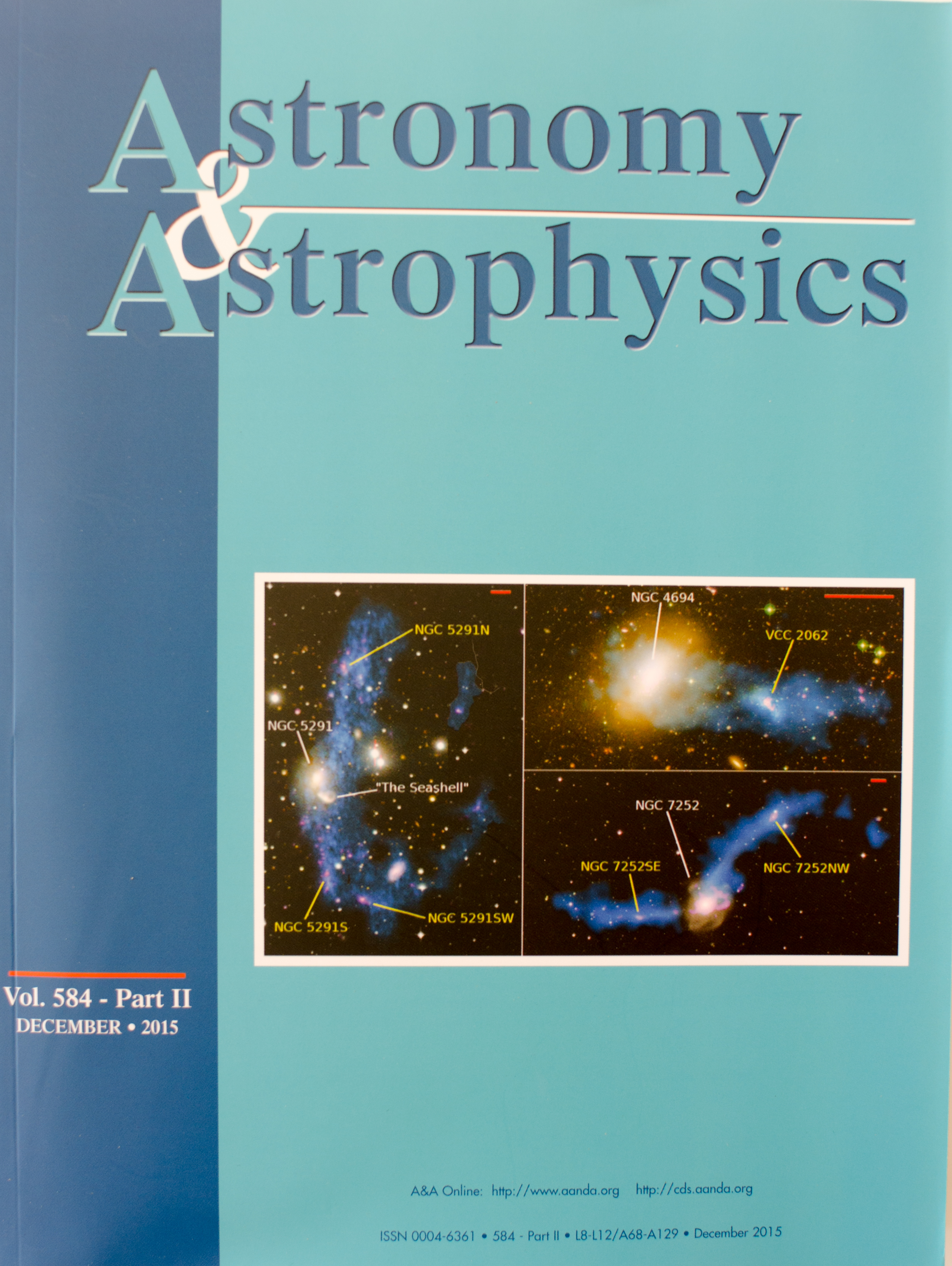
- Discipline: Astronomy, Astrophysics
- Language: English
- Edited by: Thierry Forveille, João Alves

Publication details
- History: 1969–present
- Publisher: EDP Sciences on behalf of the European Southern Observatory
- Frequency: Monthly
- Open access: Subscribe to Open
- License: CC BY 4.0
- Impact factor: 6.1 (2024)

Standard abbreviations
- ISO 4: Astron. Astrophys.

Indexing
- CODEN: AAEJAF
- ISSN: 0004-6361 (print); 1432-0746 (web)
- LCCN: 74220573
- OCLC no.: 1518497

Links
- Journal homepage; Online archive

Astronomy & Astrophysics (A&A) is a monthly peer-reviewed scientific journal covering theoretical, observational, and instrumental astronomy and astrophysics. It is operated by an editorial team under the supervision of a board of directors representing 27 sponsoring countries plus a representative of the European Southern Observatory. The journal is published by EDP Sciences and the current editors-in-chief are Thierry Forveille and João Alves.

== History ==
=== Origins ===
Astronomy & Astrophysics was created as an answer to the publishing situation found in Europe in the 1960s. At that time, multiple journals were being published in several countries around the continent. These journals usually had a limited number of subscribers, and articles were written in languages other than English. They were less widely read than American and British journals and the research they reported had therefore less impact in the community.

Starting in 1963, conversations between astronomers from European countries assessed the need for a common astronomical journal. On 8 April 1968, leading astronomers from Belgium, Denmark, France, Germany, the Netherlands, and Scandinavian countries met in Leiden University to prepare a possible merging of some of the principal existing journals. It was proposed that the new journal be called Astronomy and Astrophysics, A European Journal.

The main policy-making body of the new journal was to be the "Board of Directors", consisting of senior astronomers or government representatives of the sponsoring countries. The board appoints the editors-in chief, who are responsible for the scientific contents of the journal. The European Southern Observatory was chosen as an additional body that acts on behalf of the board and handles the administrative, financial, and legal matters of the journal.

A second meeting held in July 1968 in Brussels cemented the agreement discussed in Leiden. Each nation established an annual monetary contribution and appointed its delegates for the board of directors. Also at this meeting, the first editors-in-chief were appointed: Stuart Pottasch and Jean-Louis Steinberg.

The next meeting took place in Paris on 11 October 1968 and is officially regarded as the first meeting of the board of directors. At this meeting, the first chairman of the board, Adriaan Blaauw, was appointed, and the contract with the publisher Springer Science+Business Media was formalized.

=== Early years ===
The first issue of A&A was published in January 1969, merging several national journals of individual European countries into one comprehensive publication. These journals, with their ISSN and date of first publication, are as follows:

- Annales d'Astrophysique ISSN 0365-0499 (France), established in 1938
- Bulletin of the Astronomical Institutes of the Netherlands ISSN 0365-8910 (Netherlands), established in 1921
- Bulletin Astronomique ISSN 0245-9787 (France), established in 1884
- Journal des Observateurs ISSN 0368-3389 (France), established in 1915
- Zeitschrift für Astrophysik ISSN 0372-8331 (Germany), established in 1930

Arkiv för Astronomi (ISSN 0004-2048), established in 1948 in Sweden, was also incorporated in 1973. The publishing of Astronomy & Astrophysics was further extended in 1992 by the incorporation of Bulletin of the Astronomical Institutes of Czechoslovakia (ISSN 0004-6248), established in 1947.

There were only four issues of the journal in 1969, but it soon became a monthly publication and one of the four major generalist astronomical journals in the world. Initially, papers were submitted in English, French or German, but it soon became clear that, for a given author, the papers in English were cited twice as often as those in other languages.

In addition to regular research papers in several different fields of astrophysics. A&A featured Letters and Research Notes for short manuscripts on a significant result or idea. A Supplement Series for the journal was created in 1970 for publishing extensive tabular material and catalogs.

=== 21st century ===
The turn of the century brought important changes to the journal. In 2001, a new contract was signed with EDP Sciences, which replaced Springer as the publishing house. Special Issues featuring results of astronomical surveys and space missions such as XMM-Newton, Planck, Rosetta, and Gaia were introduced.

The editorial structure of the journal was profoundly changed in 2003 and 2005 to involve more countries in the editorial process and to better handle the increasing number of submissions. Precise criteria for publishing in Astronomy & Astrophysics were explicited in 2004. English language editing was introduced in 2001 as a service to the diverse authorship of the journal. An extensive survey of authors conducted in 2007 showed widespread satisfaction with the new directions of the journal, although the use of structured abstracts proved more controversial.

The evolution of electronic publishing resulted in the extinction of the Supplement Series, which was incorporated in the main journal in 2001, and of the printed edition in 2016. The Research Notes section was also discontinued in 2016.

In 2023, A&A announced the introduction of links between articles and corresponding ESO datasets.

The journal editorial office is located at the Paris Observatory and is supervised by the managing editor. It handles over 2000 papers per year.

An archive of the published articles and related material is maintained by the Centre de données astronomiques de Strasbourg.

== Sponsoring countries ==
The original sponsoring countries were the four countries whose journals merged to form Astronomy & Astrophysics (France, Germany, the Netherlands and Sweden), together with Belgium, Denmark, Finland, and Norway. Norway later withdrew, but Austria, Greece, Italy, Spain, and Switzerland joined during the 1970s and 1980s. The Czech Republic, Estonia, Hungary, Poland, and Slovakia all joined as new members in the 1990s.

In 2001 the words "A European Journal" were removed from the front cover in recognition of the fact that the journal was becoming increasingly global in scope. In effect, Argentina was admitted as an "observer" in 2002. In 2004 the board of directors decided that the journal "will henceforth consider applications for sponsoring membership from any country in the world with well-documented active and excellent astronomical research". Argentina became the first non-European country to gain full membership in 2005, followed by Brazil and Chile in 2006 (Brazil withdrew in 2016). Other European countries also joined during the 21st century: Portugal, Croatia, and Bulgaria during the 2010s, and Armenia, Lithuania, Norway, Serbia and Ukraine in the 2010s. The current list of member countries is listed here.

== Chairs of the Board of Directors ==
The following persons are or have been chairs of the Board of Directors:

- 2023 - : A. Kučinskas
- 2022-2023: W. J. Duschl
- 2016-2022: A. Moitinho
- 2014-2016: J. Lub
- 2011-2013: B. Nordstroem
- 2010: K.S. de Boer
- 2005-2009: G. Meynet
- 1999-2004: Aa. Sandqvist
- 1993-1998: A. Maeder
- 1979-1992: G. Contopoulos
- 1969-1978: A. Blaauw

== Editors-in-Chief ==
- 2012 - : Main Journal: Thierry Forveille, Letters: João Alves (replaced Malcolm Walmsley in 2013)
- 2006 - 2011: Main Journal: Claude Bertout; Letters: Malcolm Walmsley
- 2004 - 2005: Main Journal: Claude Bertout; Letters: Peter Schneider
- 1999 - 2003: Main Journal: Claude Bertout, Harm Habing; Letters: Peter Schneider
- 1996 - 1998: Main Journal: James Lequeux, Harm Habing; Letters: Peter Schneider (replaced Stuart Pottasch in 1997)
- 1988 - 1995: Main Journal: James Lequeux, Michael Grewing; Letters: Stuart Pottasch
- 1986 - 1988: Main Journal: Françoise Praderie, Michael Grewing; Letters:Stuart Pottasch
- 1983 - 1985: Main Journal: Catherine Cesarsky, Michael Grewing; Letters: Stuart Pottasch
- 1981 - 1982: Main Journal: James Lequeux, Michael Grewing; Letters: Stuart Pottasch
- 1979 - 1980: Main Journal: James Lequeux, Hans-Heinrich Voigt; Letters: Stuart Pottasch
- 1975 - 1978: Main Journal: Jean Heidmann, Hans-Heinrich Voigt; Letters: Stuart Pottasch (from 1976 on)
- 1973 - 1974: Jean Heidmann, Stuart Pottasch
- 1969 - 1972: Jean-Louis Steinberg, Stuart Pottasch

== Open access ==
Before 2022, the most recent issue of A&A was available free of charge for readers. Authors had the option to pay article processing charges (APC) for immediate and permanent open access. Furthermore, all Letters to the Editor and all articles published in Sections 12 to 15 were in free access at no cost to the authors. Articles in the other sections of the journal were made freely available 12 months after publication (delayed open-access), through the publisher's site and via the Astrophysics Data System.

Since the beginning of 2022, Astronomy & Astrophysics is published in full open access under the Subscribe to Open (S2O) model.

== Scientific Writing School ==
A&A organises Scientific Writing Schools aimed at postgraduate students and young researchers. The purpose of these schools is to teach young authors how to express their scientific results through adequate and efficient science writing. As of 2025, six of these schools were organised in Belgium (2008 and 2009), Hungary (2014), Chile (2016), China (2019), and Portugal (2025).

== Abstracting and indexing ==
This journal is abstracted and indexed in:

- Astrophysics Data System
- Chemical Abstracts Service
- Current Contents/Physical, Chemical & Earth Sciences
- EBSCO databases
- Ei Compendex
- Inspec
- Metadex
- ProQuest databases*Science Citation Index Expanded
- Scopus
- ZbMATH Open

According to the Journal Citation Reports, the journal has a 2022 impact factor of 6.5.

== See also ==
- The Astronomical Journal
- The Astrophysical Journal
- Monthly Notices of the Royal Astronomical Society
