= Election results of Cabinet Ministers during the 2017 French legislative election =

This is a regrouping of the election results for cabinet ministers during the 2017 French legislative election.

== Context ==
=== Non-candidate ministers ===
Ministers who did not present themselves during the election included:

- Édouard Philippe, Prime Minister
- Gérard Collomb, Minister of the Interior
- Nicolas Hulot, Minister of State, Minister of Ecological and Solidary Transition
- François Bayrou, Minister of State, Keeper of the Seals, Minister of Justice
- Sylvie Goulard, Minister of the Armed Forces
- Jean-Yves Le Drian, Minister of Europe and Foreign Affairs
- Agnès Buzyn, Minister of Solidarity and Health
- Françoise Nyssen, Ministry of Culture
- Muriel Pénicaud, Minister of Labour
- Jean-Michel Blanquer, Ministry of National Education
- Jacques Mézard, Ministry of Agriculture and Agrifood
- Gérald Darmanin, Minister of Public Action and Accounts
- Frédérique Vidal, Minister of Higher Education, Research and Innovation
- Laura Flessel, Minister of Sports
- Élisabeth Borne, Minister of Transport, delegated to the Minister of Ecological and Solidary Transition
- Marlène Schiappa, Secretary of State for Gender Equality
- Sophie Cluzel, Secretary of State in charge of Disabled People

== Detailed table ==
Government function	Portrait	Name	Party	Constituency	Results		Status	
Government function	Portrait	Name	Party	Constituency	1st round	2nd round	Final result	Ref.
Ministers								
Minister of Territorial Cohesion		Richard Ferrand	LREM	Finistère's 6th constituency Deputy since 2012.	33.93%	56.53%	Elected in the second round	
Minister of Finance		Bruno Le Maire	LREM	Eure's 1st constituency Deputy since 2007.	44.46%	64.53%	Elected in the second round	
Minister of the Overseas		Annick Girardin	PRG	Saint Pierre and Miquelon's 1st constituency Deputy since 2007.	41.59%	51.87%	Elected in the second round	
Minister in Charge of European Affairs		Marielle de Sarnez	MoDem	Paris's 11th constituency Second-time candidate in the constituency, lost in 2007.	40.58%	63.51%	Elected in the second round	
Secretaries of State								
Secretary of State in charge of Parliamentary Relationships; Government spokesperson		Christophe Castaner	LREM	Alpes-de-Haute-Provence's 2nd constituency Deputy since 2012.	44.04%	61.57%	Elected in the second round	
Secretary of State for the Digital Sector		Mounir Mahjoubi	LREM	Paris's 16th constituency First-time candidate in the constituency.	38.08%	51.18%	Elected in the second round	
