= Second Philippe government =

Government of France (2017–2020)

- 41st Government of French Fifth Republic

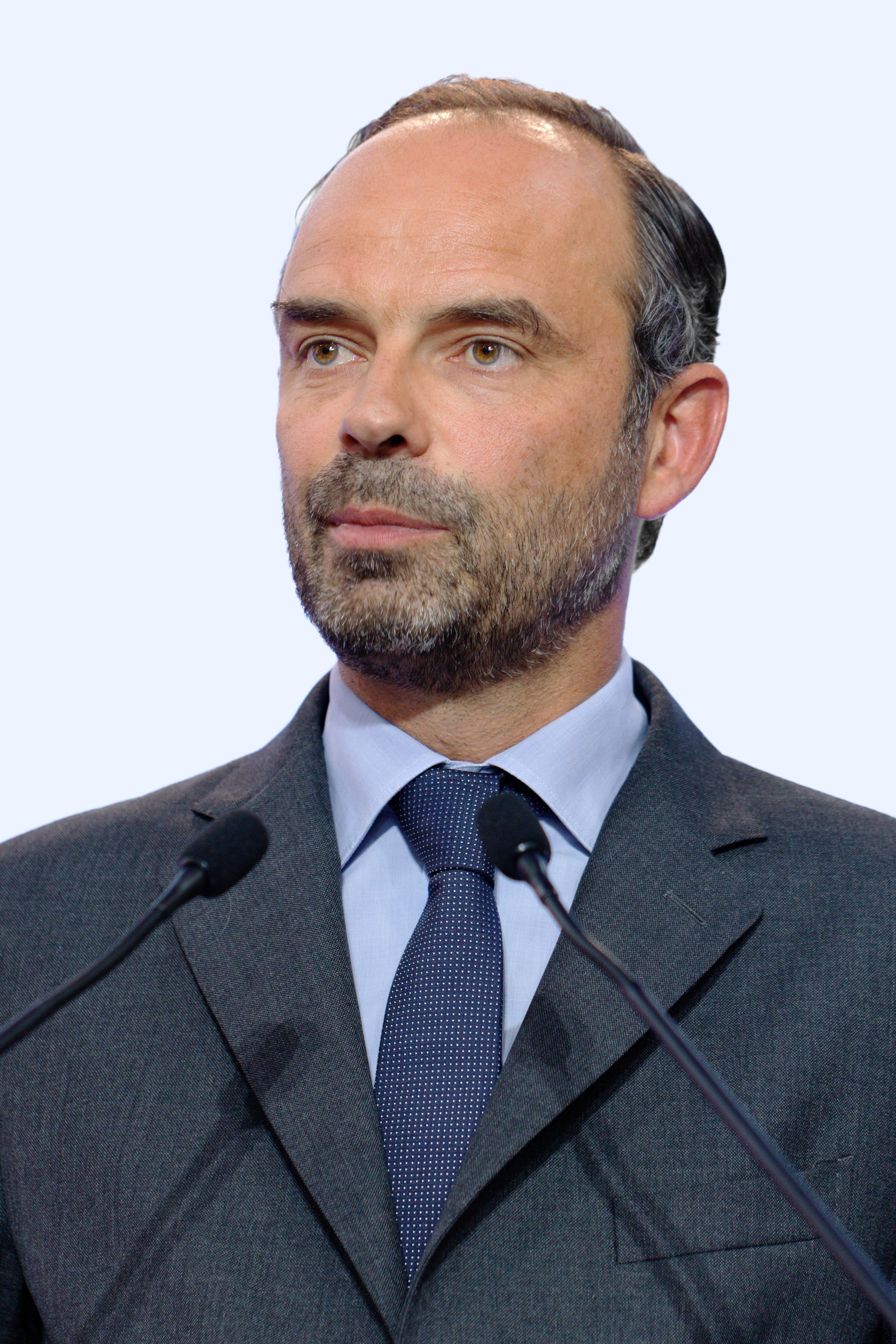
- Édouard Philippe
- Date formed: 19 June 2017
- Date dissolved: 3 July 2020

People and organisations
- President of the Republic: Emmanuel Macron
- Prime Minister: Édouard Philippe
- Ministers of State: Nicolas Hulot (Ecological and Solidary Transition, resigned in September 2018); Gérard Collomb (Interior, resigned in October 2018); François de Rugy (Ecological and Solidary Transition, appointed in September 2018 and resigned in July 2019)
- Total no. of members: Ministers: 19; Secretaries of State: 12
- Member parties: REM–MoDem–MR–Agir
- Status in legislature: Majority

History
- Election: 2017
- Predecessor: Philippe I
- Successor: Castex

The second Philippe government (French: gouvernement Édouard Philippe II) was the forty-first government of the French Fifth Republic. It was the second government formed by Édouard Philippe under President Emmanuel Macron, following the 2017 legislative election and the dissolution of the first Philippe government on 19 June 2017.

The second Philippe government was formed following scandal among ministers during the first Philippe government. La République En Marche! (REM) allies Democratic Movement (MoDem) were facing scandal following allegations that the party used EU funds to pay party workers. Armed Forces Minister Sylvie Goulard was the first to step down, resigning on 20 June 2017. The following day, Minister of Justice François Bayrou and European Affairs Minister, Marielle de Sarnez stepped down. Richard Ferrand, Minister of Territorial Cohesion, stepped down on 19 June 2017 following Le Canard Enchaîné publishing allegations of nepotism on 24 May 2017. Macron defended Ferrand despite the allegations and public polling showing that 70% of respondents wanted Ferrand to step down. On 1 July 2017, a regional prosecutor announced that authorities had launched a preliminary investigation into Ferrand. Ferrand responded to the allegations saying everything was "legal, public and transparent". He was one of the founding members of La République En Marche! and served as President of the National Assembly until losing his parliamentary seat in the 2022 elections.

On 31 July 2018, the second Philippe government survived two motions of no confidence following the Benalla affair: the first one (entered by The Republicans group) obtained 103 ayes, while the second (entered by the groups New Left, Democratic Republican Left and La France Insoumise) obtained 63 votes. Both motions did not reach the quorum of 289 votes required in the National Assembly.

On 13 December 2018, a third motion of no confidence was initiated by the Socialist Party, the French Communist Party and La France Insoumise following the yellow vests movement but there were only 70 votes in favour.

Until the departure of François de Rugy, there was gender parity in the second Philippe government, with 18 women and 18 men, including the Prime Minister. Since de Rugy's replacement with Élisabeth Borne in July 2019, there have been more women (18) than men (17) in the government. They are, however, over-represented among the Secretaries of State (9 women, 6 men), and less present at the head of full-fledged ministries (9 women, 10 men).

== Composition ==
=== Initial ===
Initial

Post	Name	Party
Prime Minister	Édouard Philippe	LR
Ministers of State
Minister of State, Minister of the Interior	Gérard Collomb	PS
Minister of State, Minister of Ecological and Solidary Transition	Nicolas Hulot	SE
Ministers
Keeper of the Seals, Minister of Justice	Nicole Belloubet	SE
Ministry for Europe and Foreign Affairs	Jean-Yves Le Drian	PS
Minister of the Armed Forces	Florence Parly	SE
Minister of Territorial Cohesion	Jacques Mézard	PRG
Minister of Solidarity and Health	Agnès Buzyn	SE
Minister of the Economy and Finance	Bruno Le Maire	LR
Minister of Culture	Françoise Nyssen	SE
Minister of Labour	Muriel Pénicaud	SE
Minister of National Education	Jean-Michel Blanquer	SE
Minister of Agriculture and Food	Stéphane Travert	LREM
Minister of Public Action and Accounts	Gérald Darmanin	LR
Minister of Higher Education, Research and Innovation	Frédérique Vidal	SE
Minister for Overseas France	Annick Girardin	PRG
Minister of Sport	Laura Flessel-Colovic	LREM

Deputy Ministers

Post	Attached minister	Name	Party
Minister for Transport	Minister of State, Minister for the Ecological and Inclusive Transition	Élisabeth Borne	SE
Minister for European Affairs	Ministry for Europe and Foreign Affairs	Nathalie Loiseau	LREM
Minister	Minister of State, Minister of the Interior	Jacqueline Gourault	MoDem

Secretaries of State

Post	Attached minister	Name	Party
Secretary of State for Relations with Parliament, Government Spokesman	Prime Minister	Christophe Castaner	LREM
Secretary of State for Gender Equality	Prime Minister	Marlène Schiappa	LREM
Secretary of State for Disabled People	Prime Minister	Sophie Cluzel	SE
Secretary of State for the Digital Sector	Prime Minister	Mounir Mahjoubi	LREM
Secretary of State	Minister of State, Minister for the Ecological and Inclusive Transition	Sébastien Lecornu	LR
Secretary of State	Minister of State, Minister for the Ecological and Inclusive Transition	Brune Poirson	LREM
Secretary of State	Ministry for Europe and Foreign Affairs	Jean-Baptiste Lemoyne	LR
Secretary of State	Minister of the Armed Forces	Geneviève Darrieussecq	MoDem
Secretary of State	Minister of Territorial Cohesion	Julien Denormandie	LREM
Secretary of State	Minister of the Economy and Finance	Benjamin Griveaux	LREM

=== Current ===
Post	Name	Party
Prime Minister	Édouard Philippe	SE
Ministers
Keeper of the Seals, Minister of Justice	Nicole Belloubet	SE
Minister of Ecological and Solidary Transition	Élisabeth Borne	LREM
Ministry for Europe and Foreign Affairs	Jean-Yves Le Drian	TDP
Minister of the Armed Forces	Florence Parly	SE
Minister of the Interior	Christophe Castaner	LREM
Minister of Territorial Cohesion and Relations with Local Authorities	Jacqueline Gourault	MoDem
Minister of Solidarity and Health	Olivier Véran	LREM
Minister of the Economy and Finance	Bruno Le Maire	LREM
Minister of Culture	Franck Riester	Agir
Minister of Labour	Muriel Pénicaud	LREM
Minister of National Education and Youth	Jean-Michel Blanquer	LREM
Minister of Agriculture and Food	Didier Guillaume	SE
Minister of Public Action and Accounts	Gérald Darmanin	LREM
Minister of Higher Education, Research and Innovation	Frédérique Vidal	LREM
Minister of Overseas France	Annick Girardin	MR
Minister of Sport	Roxana Mărăcineanu	SE

Deputy Ministers

Post	Attached minister	Name	Party
Minister of Relations with Parliament	Prime Minister	Marc Fesneau	MoDem
Minister of Local Authorities	Minister of Territorial Cohesion and Relations with Local Authorities	Sébastien Lecornu	LREM
Minister of the City and Housing	Minister of Territorial Cohesion and Relations with Local Authorities	Julien Denormandie	LREM

Secretaries of State

Post	Attached minister	Name	Party
Government Spokeswoman	Prime Minister	Sibeth Ndiaye	LREM
Secretary of State for Gender Equality and the Fight against Discrimination	Prime Minister	Marlène Schiappa	LREM
Secretary of State for Disabled People	Prime Minister	Sophie Cluzel	LREM
Secretary of State	Minister of State, Minister of Ecological and Solidary Transition	Emmanuelle Wargon	LREM
Secretary of State	Minister of State, Minister of Ecological and Solidary Transition	Brune Poirson	LREM
Secretary of State for Transport	Minister of State, Minister of Ecological and Solidary Transition	Jean-Baptiste Djebbari	LREM
Secretary of State for European Affairs	Ministry for Europe and Foreign Affairs	Amélie de Montchalin	LREM
Secretary of State	Ministry for Europe and Foreign Affairs	Jean-Baptiste Lemoyne	LREM
Secretary of State	Minister of the Armed Forces	Geneviève Darrieussecq	MoDem
Secretary of State	Minister of National Education and Youth	Gabriel Attal	LREM
Secretary of State	Minister of Solidarity and Health	Christelle Dubos	LREM
Secretary of State for Child Protection	Minister of Solidarity and Health	Adrien Taquet	LREM
Secretary of State for Pensions	Minister of Solidarity and Health	Laurent Pietraszewski	LREM
Secretary of State for the Digital Sector	Minister of the Economy and Finance; Minister of Public Action and Accounts	Cédric O	LREM
Secretary of State	Minister of the Economy and Finance	Agnès Pannier-Runacher	LREM
Secretary of State	Minister of Public Action and Accounts	Olivier Dussopt	TDP
Secretary of State	Minister of the Interior	Laurent Nuñez	LREM

=== Changes ===
- On 24 November 2017, Christophe Castaner was replaced as Government Spokesman by Benjamin Griveaux, who was replaced as Secretary of State to the Minister of the Economy and Finance by Delphine Gény-Stephann, while Socialist Olivier Dussopt was appointed as Secretary of State to the Minister of Public Action and Accounts.
- On 28 August 2018, Nicolas Hulot announced his resignation from the government during a live radio interview on France Inter. On 4 September, Laura Flessel announced her resignation from the government, with their respective replacements announced as François de Rugy and Roxana Mărăcineanu.
- On 1 October 2018, the Minister of the Interior Gérard Collomb brings his resignation to President Macron who refuses it. He renews his intention a few days later and Emmanuel Macron accepts the resignation. President Macron then asks Prime Minister Édouard Philippe to act as interim.
- On 16 October 2018, Christophe Castaner is appointed Minister of the Interior, which puts an end to Édouard Philippe's tenure. Marc Fesneau replaces Christophe Castaner at Relations with Parliament. Franck Riester is appointed Minister of Culture to replace Françoise Nyssen. Didier Guillaume is appointed Minister of Agriculture and Food in replacement of Stéphane Travert. Jacqueline Gourault is appointed Minister of Territorial Cohesion to replace Jacques Mézard and her portfolio is extended to Relations with local authorities. Delphine Gény-Stephann is not renewed. Are also appointed Secretary of State Gabriel Attal to the National Education, Laurent Nuñez in the Interior, Christelle Dubos to Solidarity and Health, Agnès Pannier-Runacher to the Economy and Emmanuelle Wargon to Ecology. In addition, several members of the government have their powers modified (Sébastien Lecornu, Mounir Mahjoubi) or expanded (Jean-Michel Blanquer, Marlene Schiappa, Julien Denormandie).
- On 25 January 2019, Adrien Taquet is appointed Secretary of State for Child Protection to the Minister of Solidarity and Health, Agnès Buzyn.
- On 27 March 2019, in view of the 2019 European elections and 2020 municipal election in Paris, Nathalie Loiseau, Benjamin Griveaux, as well as Mounir Mahjoubi leave their government responsibilities, with Le Drian temporarily assuming responsibility for Loiseau's ministerial portfolio.
- On 31 March 2019, Amélie de Montchalin is appointed Secretary of State for European Affairs, succeeding Nathalie Loiseau. Sibeth Ndiaye is appointed Government Spokeswoman, succeeding Benjamin Griveaux. Cédric O is appointed State Secretary for the Digital Economy, succeeding Mounir Mahjoubi.
- On 16 July 2019, after various revelations from Mediapart, François de Rugy, Minister for the Ecological and Inclusive Transition, resigns. He is replaced by Élisabeth Borne, previously Minister for Transport. Unlike her predecessor, she is not appointed Minister of State.
- On 3 September 2019, the High Commissioner for retirement reform, Jean-Paul Delevoye enters the government and reports to Agnès Buzyn, Minister of Solidarity and Health. Jean-Baptiste Djebbari is appointed Secretary of State for Transport and reports to Élisabeth Borne, Minister for the Ecological Transition.
- On 18 December 2019, implicated in a case of multiple income and conflict of interest, Jean-Paul Delevoye resigned on December 16, 2019.Laurent Pietraszewski, member of the National Assembly, joined the Government two days later, as Secretary of State in charge of pensions.
- On 16 February 2020, following the renunciation of Benjamin Griveaux to his candidacy for municipal elections in Paris, the Minister of Solidarity and Health, Agnès Buzyn is appointed to replace him as head of the list. As a result, she resigns from her post as minister. She is replaced by Olivier Véran.

== Gallery ==
=== Prime minister ===
Portrait	Post	Name	Party
Édouard Philippe	Prime Minister	Édouard Philippe	LR, later DVD

=== Ministers ===
Portrait	Post	Name	Party
Nicole Belloubet	Keeper of the Seals, Minister of Justice	Nicole Belloubet	DVG
Jean-Yves Le Drian	Ministry for Europe and Foreign Affairs	Jean-Yves Le Drian	PS, later DVG
Florence Parly	Minister of the Armed Forces	Florence Parly	DVG
Élisabeth Borne	Minister for the Ecological and Inclusive Transition	Élisabeth Borne	REM
Olivier Véran	Minister of Solidarity and Health	Olivier Véran	REM
Bruno Le Maire	Minister of the Economy and Finance	Bruno Le Maire	LR, later REM
Muriel Pénicaud	Minister of Labour	Muriel Pénicaud	DVG, later REM
Jean-Michel Blanquer	Minister of National Education and Youth	Jean-Michel Blanquer	DVD, later REM
Gérald Darmanin	Minister of Public Action and Accounts	Gérald Darmanin	LR, later REM
Christophe Castaner	Minister of the Interior	Christophe Castaner	REM
Frédérique Vidal	Minister of Higher Education, Research and Innovation	Frédérique Vidal	SE, later REM
Jacqueline Gourault	Minister of Territorial Cohesion and Relationships with territorial collectivities	Jacqueline Gourault	MoDem
Annick Girardin	Minister of Overseas France	Annick Girardin	PRG, later MR
Franck Riester	Minister of Culture	Franck Riester	Agir
Didier Guillaume	Minister of Agriculture and Food	Didier Guillaume	DVG
Roxana Maracineanu	Minister of Sport	Roxana Maracineanu	DVG

=== Deputy Ministers ===
Portrait	Post	Attached minister	Name	Party
Marc Fesneau	Minister of Relations with Parliament	Prime Minister	Marc Fesneau	MoDem
Sébastien Lecornu	Minister of Local Authorities	Minister of Territorial Cohesion and Relations with Local Authorities	Sébastien Lecornu	REM
Julien Denormandie	Minister of the City and Housing	Minister of Territorial Cohesion and Relations with Local Authorities	Julien Denormandie	REM

=== Secretaries of State ===
Portrait	Post	Attached minister	Name	Party
	Government Spokeswoman	Prime Minister	Sibeth Ndiaye	REM
Marlène Schiappa	Secretary of State for Gender Equality and the Fight against Discrimination	Prime Minister	Marlène Schiappa	REM
Sophie Cluzel	Secretary of State for Disabled People	Prime Minister	Sophie Cluzel	SE
Emmanuelle Wargon	Secretary of State	Minister of State, Minister for the Ecological and Inclusive Transition	Emmanuelle Wargon	DVG
Brune Poirson	Secretary of State	Minister of State, Minister for the Ecological and Inclusive Transition	Brune Poirson	REM
Jean-Baptiste Djebbari	Secretary of State for Transport	Minister of State, Minister for the Ecological and Inclusive Transition	Jean-Baptiste Djebbari	REM
	Secretary of State for European Affairs	Ministry for Europe and Foreign Affairs	Amélie de Montchalin	REM
Jean-Baptiste Lemoyne	Secretary of State	Ministry for Europe and Foreign Affairs	Jean-Baptiste Lemoyne	LR, later REM
Geneviève Darrieussecq	Secretary of State	Minister of the Armed Forces	Geneviève Darrieussecq	MoDem
Christelle Dubos	Secretary of State	Minister of Solidarity and Health	Christelle Dubos	REM
Adrien Taquet	Secretary of State for Child Protection	Minister of Solidarity and Health	Adrien Taquet	REM
Laurent Pietraszewski	Secretary of State for Pensions	Minister of Solidarity and Health	Laurent Pietraszewski	REM
Cédric O	Secretary of State for the Digital Sector	Minister of the Economy and Finance	Cédric O	REM
Agnès Pannier-Runacher	Secretary of State	Minister of the Economy and Finance	Agnès Pannier-Runacher	REM
Olivier Dussopt	Secretary of State	Minister of Public Action and Accounts	Olivier Dussopt	PS, later DVG
Gabriel Attal	Secretary of State	Minister of National Education and Youth	Gabriel Attal	REM
Laurent Nuñez	Secretary of State	Minister of the Interior	Laurent Nuñez	SE, later REM

Preceded by First Philippe government	Government of France; 2017–2020	Succeeded by Castex government
