= Castex government =

Government of France (2020–2022)

- 42nd Government of French Fifth Republic

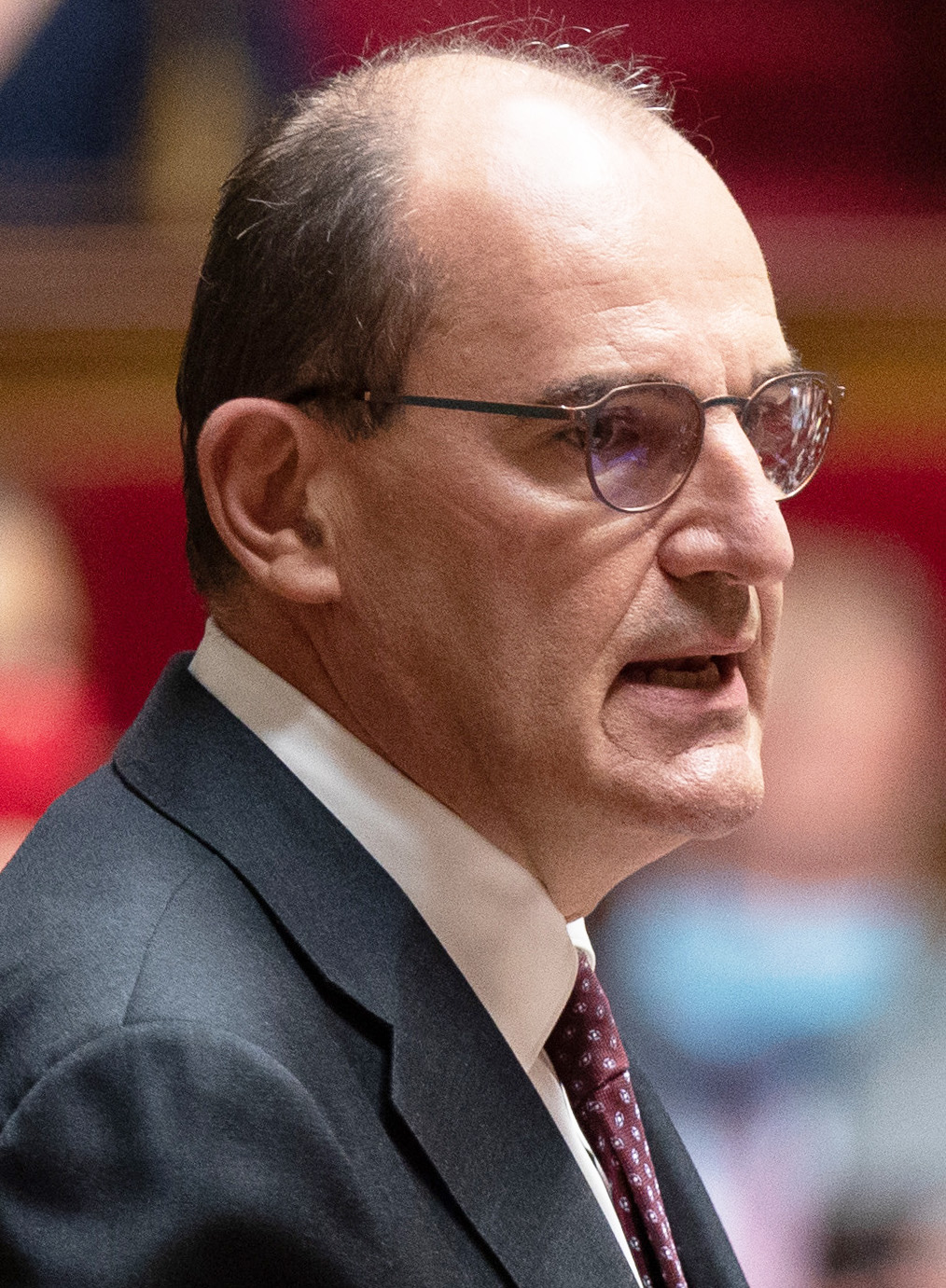
- Castex in 2020
- Date formed: 3 July 2020
- Date dissolved: 16 May 2022

People and organisations
- President: Emmanuel Macron
- Prime Minister: Jean Castex
- Member parties: LREM; MoDem; RAD; Agir; TDP; EC
- Status in legislature: Majority

History
- Election: 2017
- Predecessor: Philippe II
- Successor: Borne

The Castex government (French: gouvernement Castex) was the forty-second government of the French Fifth Republic, formed on 3 July 2020 and headed by Jean Castex as Prime Minister under the presidency of Emmanuel Macron. It was dissolved on 16 May 2022, after Élisabeth Borne was selected as prime minister following the re-election of Macron.

== Context ==
=== Formation ===
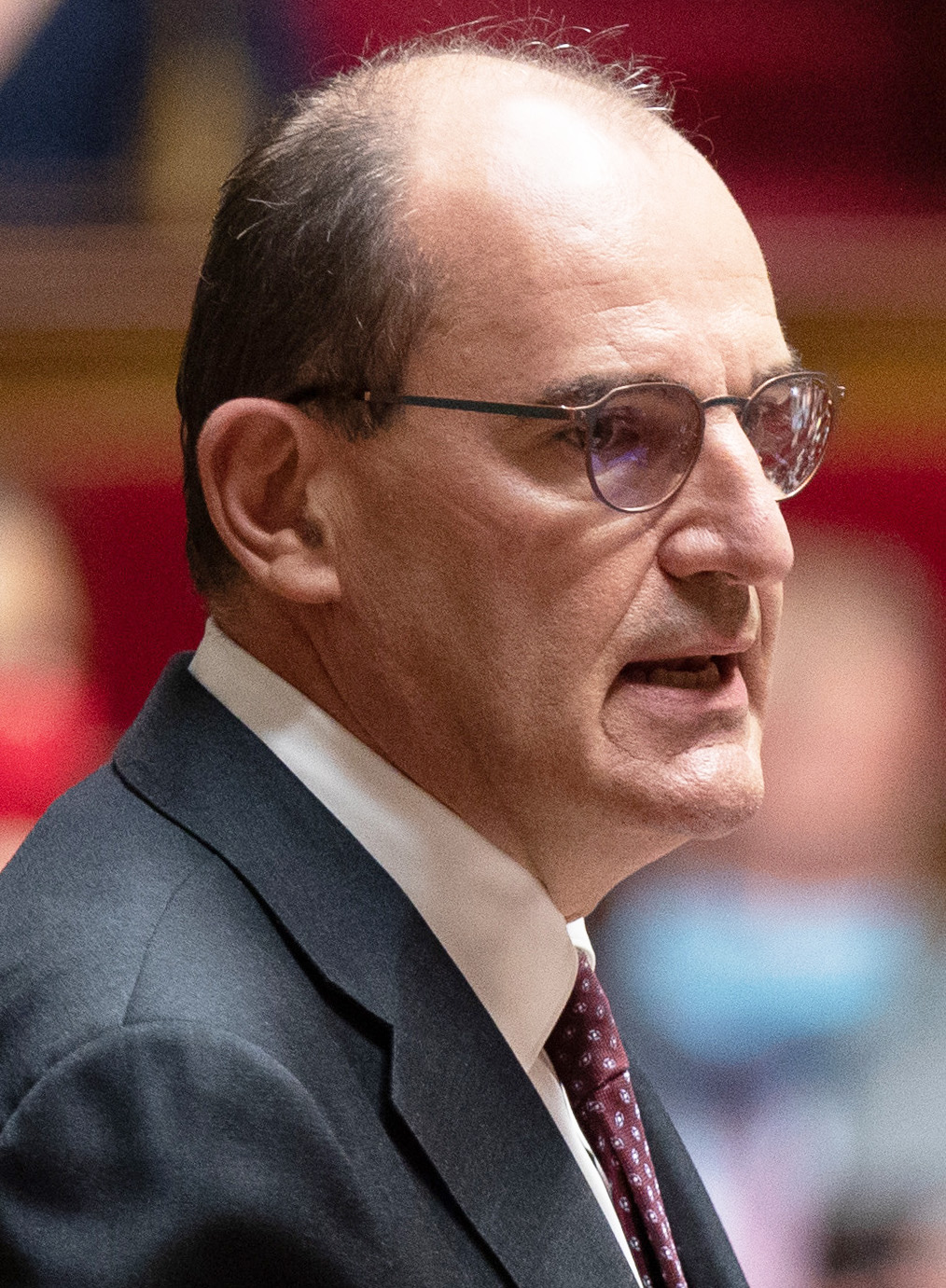
Castex in 2020

After three years with the same government, the 2020 municipal elections raised the question of a new administration and led to speculations about a governmental reshuffle. The performance of President Macron's party, La République En Marche! (LREM), at these elections strengthened the rumors. On 3 July 2020, Édouard Philippe tendered the resignation of his government to the President of the Republic. The same day, the Élysée Palace informed the press that Jean Castex, incumbent Mayor of Prades, would replace him and form a new government, the third since the election of Macron.

At the time of his appointment, Castex was very little known, only for his management of France's exit of lockdown following the COVID-19 pandemic. The composition of the government was announced on 6 July 2020 by Alexis Kohler, Secretary-General of the Élysée Palace, with a sizeable number of ministers from the previous one retained. Among the main changes, Gérald Darmanin, previously Minister for Public Accounts, replaced at the Interior Christophe Castaner who was heavily criticised by National Police's unions following accusations of violence and racism in their ranks. However, the nomination of Darmanin was met with protests by feminist movements over accusations of rape in 2009, as well as the one of Minister of Justice Éric Dupond-Moretti for his defense as lawyer of men accused of rapes.

The new cabinet also saw the return of Roselyne Bachelot, who previously served as minister under Jacques Chirac and Nicolas Sarkozy, as well as Barbara Pompili, former Secretary of State for Biodiversity under François Hollande, while main portfolios holders, such as Jean-Yves Le Drian, Jean-Michel Blanquer, Bruno Le Maire or Florence Parly remained in office.

The Prime Minister delivered his policy speech before the National Assembly and asked for its confidence on 15 July 2020; he obtained it by 345 votes out of 577.

On 26 July, the remaining state secretaries were appointed. Bruno Le Maire declared to be working at relaunching the French economy while Castex said to be ready to reopen dialogue over a controversial pension reform. A plan for a new lockdown amid the COVID-19 pandemic was also said to be ready.

== Composition ==
Ministers

Portfolio	Name	Party
Prime Minister	Jean Castex	SE
Minister of Europe and Foreign Affairs	Jean-Yves Le Drian	TDP
Minister of National Education, Youth and Sports	Jean-Michel Blanquer	LREM
Minister of the Economy, Finance and Recovery	Bruno Le Maire	LREM
Minister of the Armed Forces	Florence Parly	TDP
Minister of the Interior	Gérald Darmanin	LREM
Minister of Labour, Employment and Integration	Élisabeth Borne	LREM
Minister of the Ecological Transition	Barbara Pompili	LREM
Minister of Territorial Cohesion and Relations with Local Authorities	Jacqueline Gourault	MoDem
Keeper of the Seals, Minister of Justice	Éric Dupond-Moretti	SE
Minister of Culture	Roselyne Bachelot	SE
Minister of the Overseas	Sébastien Lecornu	LREM
Minister of Solidarity and Health	Olivier Véran	LREM
Minister of the Sea	Annick Girardin	MR
Minister of Higher Education, Research and Innovation	Frédérique Vidal	LREM
Minister of Agriculture and Food	Julien Denormandie	LREM
Minister of Public Transformation and Service	Amélie de Montchalin	LREM

Deputy Ministers

Portfolio	Attached minister	Name	Party
Minister for Relations with Parliament and Citizen Participation	Prime Minister	Marc Fesneau	MoDem
Minister for Gender Equality, Diversity and Equal Opportunities	Prime Minister	Élisabeth Moreno	LREM
Minister for Foreign Trade and Attractiveness	Minister of Europe and Foreign Affairs	Franck Riester	Agir
Minister for Housing	Minister of the Ecological Transition	Emmanuelle Wargon	LREM
Minister for Transport	Minister of the Ecological Transition	Jean-Baptiste Djebbari	LREM
Minister for Public Accounts	Minister of the Economy, Finance and Recovery	Olivier Dussopt	TDP
Minister for Industry	Minister of the Economy, Finance and Recovery	Agnès Pannier-Runacher	LREM
Minister for Small and Medium-Sized Enterprises	Minister of the Economy, Finance and Recovery	Alain Griset	LREM
Minister for Sports	Minister of National Education, Youth and Sports	Roxana Maracineanu	SE
Minister for Memory and Veterans Affairs	Minister of the Armed Forces	Geneviève Darrieussecq	MoDem
Minister for Citizenship	Minister of the Interior	Marlène Schiappa	LREM
Minister for Integration	Minister of Labour, Employment and Integration	Brigitte Klinkert	LREM
Minister for the City	Minister of Territorial Cohesion and Relations with Local Authorities	Nadia Hai	LREM
Minister for Autonomy	Minister of Solidarity and Health	Brigitte Bourguignon	LREM

State Secretaries

Portfolio	Attached minister	Name	Party
Government Spokesman	Prime Minister	Gabriel Attal	LREM
State Secretary for Disabled Persons	Prime Minister	Sophie Cluzel	LREM
State Secretary for Tourism, the French Abroad and the Francophonie	Minister of Europe and Foreign Affairs	Jean-Baptiste Lemoyne	LREM
State Secretary for European Affairs	Minister of Europe and Foreign Affairs	Clément Beaune	LREM
State Secretary for Biodiversity	Minister of the Ecological Transition	Bérangère Abba	LREM
State Secretary for Priority Education	Minister of National Education, Youth and Sports	Nathalie Élimas	MoDem
State Secretary for Youth and Commitment	Minister of National Education, Youth and Sports	Sarah El Haïry	MoDem
State Secretary for Digital Transition and Electronic Communications	Minister of the Economy, Finance and Recovery; Minister of Territorial Cohesion and Relations with Local Authorities	Cédric O	LREM
State Secretary for the Social, Inclusive and Responsible Economy	Minister of the Economy, Finance and Recovery	Olivia Grégoire	LREM
State Secretary for Pensions and Occupational Health	Minister of Labour, Employment and Integration	Laurent Pietraszewski	LREM
State Secretary for Rurality	Minister of Territorial Cohesion and Relations with Local Authorities	Joël Giraud	LREM
State Secretary for Children and Families	Minister of Solidarity and Health	Adrien Taquet	LREM
