= First Philippe government =

40th Government of the French Fifth Republic

- 40th Government of French Fifth Republic

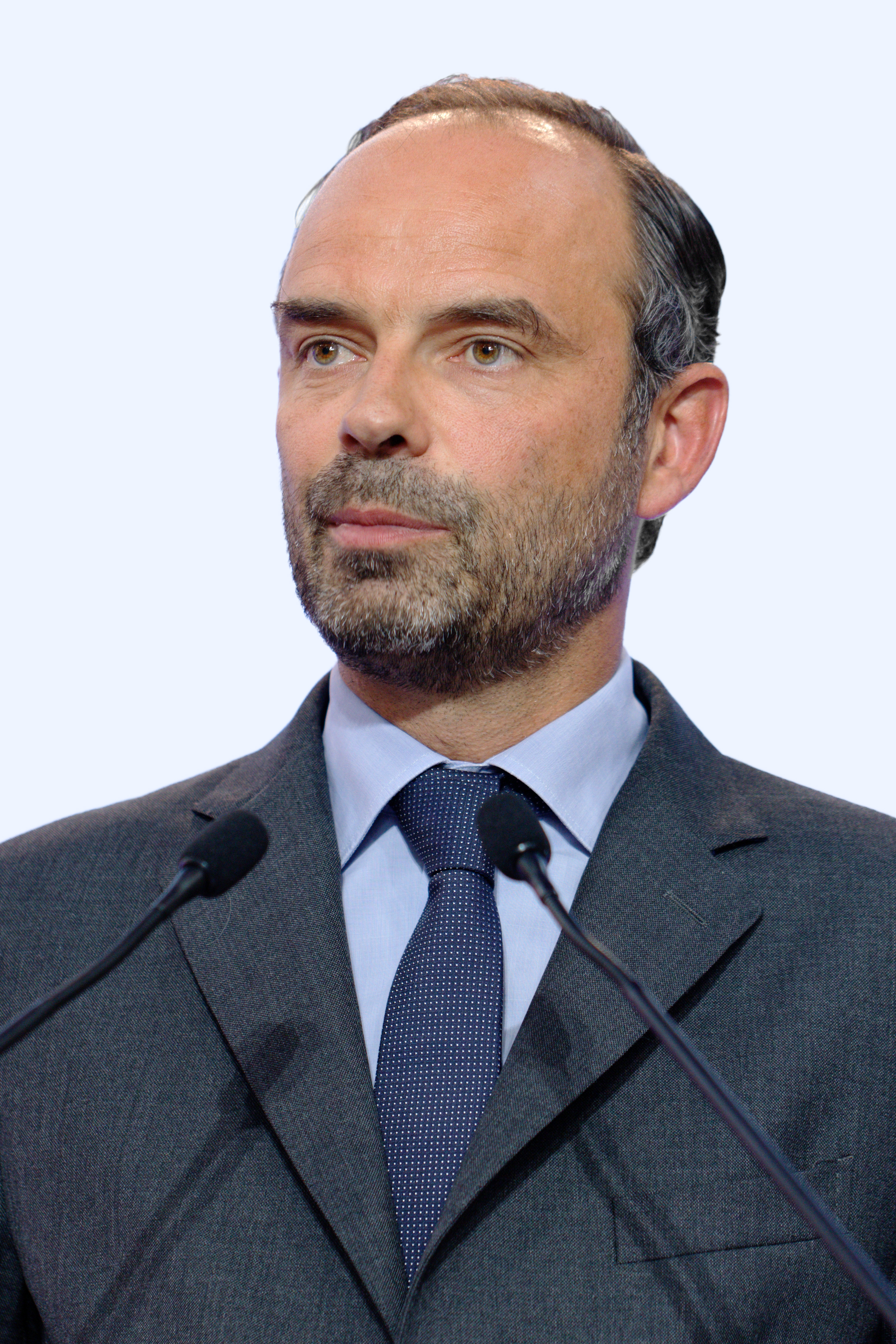
- Édouard Philippe
- Date formed: 15 May 2017
- Date dissolved: 19 June 2017

People and organisations
- President of the Republic: Emmanuel Macron
- Prime Minister: Édouard Philippe
- Ministers of State: Nicolas Hulot (Ecological and Solidary Transition); Gérard Collomb (Interior); François Bayrou (Justice)
- No. of ministers: 18
- Member parties: REM; MoDem; PRG; LR dissidents PS dissidents

History
- Predecessor: Cazeneuve
- Successor: Philippe II

The first Philippe government (French: Gouvernement Édouard Philippe I) was the fortieth government of the French Fifth Republic. It was the first government formed by Édouard Philippe under President Emmanuel Macron, prior to the 2017 legislative election.

== Context of formation ==
On 15 May 2017, Édouard Philippe was appointed as prime minister by President Emmanuel Macron.

== Composition ==
=== Initial ===
Post	Name	Party
Prime Minister	Édouard Philippe	LR
Ministers of State
Minister of State, Minister of the Interior	Gérard Collomb	PS
Minister of State, Minister of Ecological and Solidary Transition	Nicolas Hulot	SE
Minister of State, Keeper of the Seals, Minister of Justice	François Bayrou	MoDem
Ministers
Minister of the Armed Forces	Sylvie Goulard	MoDem
Minister for Europe and Foreign Affairs	Jean-Yves Le Drian	PS
Minister of Territorial Cohesion	Richard Ferrand	LREM
Minister for Solidarity and Health	Agnès Buzyn	SE
Minister of Culture	Françoise Nyssen	SE
Minister of the Economy	Bruno Le Maire	LR
Minister of National Education	Jean-Michel Blanquer	SE
Minister of Labour	Muriel Pénicaud	SE
Minister of Agriculture and Food	Jacques Mézard	PRG
Minister of Public Action and Accounts	Gérald Darmanin	LR
Minister of Higher Education, Research and Innovation	Frédérique Vidal	SE
Minister for Overseas France	Annick Girardin	PRG
Minister of Sport	Laura Flessel-Colovic	SE

Deputy Ministers

Post	Attached minister	Name	Party
Minister for Transport	Minister of Ecological and Solidary Transition	Élisabeth Borne	SE
Minister for European Affairs	Minister for Europe and Foreign Affairs	Marielle de Sarnez	MoDem

Secretaries of State

Post	Attached minister	Name	Party
Secretary of State for Relations with Parliament, Government Spokesman	Prime Minister	Christophe Castaner	LREM
Secretary of State for Gender Equality	Prime Minister	Marlène Schiappa	LREM
Secretary of State for Disabled People	Prime Minister	Sophie Cluzel	SE
Secretary of State for the Digital Sector	Prime Minister	Mounir Mahjoubi	LREM

== Gallery ==
=== Prime minister ===
Portrait	Post	Name	Party
Édouard Philippe	Prime Minister	Édouard Philippe	LR

=== Ministers of State ===
Portrait	Post	Name	Party
Gérard Collomb	Minister of State, Minister of the Interior	Gérard Collomb	LREM
Nicolas Hulot	Minister of State, Minister for the Ecological and Inclusive Transition	Nicolas Hulot	SE
François Bayrou	Minister of State, Keeper of the Seals, Minister of Justice	François Bayrou	MoDem

=== Ministers ===
Portrait	Post	Name	Party
Sylvie Goulard	Minister of the Armed Services	Sylvie Goulard	LREM
Jean-Yves Le Drian	Minister for Europe and Foreign Affairs	Jean-Yves Le Drian	PS
Richard Ferrand	Minister of Territorial Cohesion	Richard Ferrand	LREM
Agnès Buzyn	Minister for Solidarity and Health	Agnès Buzyn	LREM
Françoise Nyssen	Minister of Culture	Françoise Nyssen	DVG
Bruno Le Maire	Minister of the Economy	Bruno Le Maire	LREM
Jean-Michel Blanquer	Minister of National Education	Jean-Michel Blanquer	LREM
Muriel Pénicaud	Minister of Labour	Muriel Pénicaud	LREM
Jacques Mézard	Minister of Agriculture and Food	Jacques Mézard	PRG
Gérald Darmanin	Minister of Public Action and Accounts	Gérald Darmanin	LREM
Frédérique Vidal	Minister of Higher Education, Research and Innovation	Frédérique Vidal	Ind.
Annick Girardin	Minister for Overseas France	Annick Girardin	PRG
Laura Flessel-Colovic	Minister of Sport	Laura Flessel-Colovic	LREM

=== Deputy Ministers ===
Image	Post	Attached minister	Name	Party
Élisabeth Borne	Minister for Transport	Minister for the Ecological and Inclusive Transition	Élisabeth Borne	LREM
Marielle de Sarnez	Minister for European Affairs	Minister for Europe and Foreign Affairs	Marielle de Sarnez	MoDem

=== Secretaries of State ===
Portrait	Post	Attached minister	Name	Party
Christophe Castaner	Secretary of State for Relations with Parliament, Government Spokesman	Prime Minister	Christophe Castaner	LREM
Marlène Schiappa	Secretary of State for Gender Equality	Prime Minister	Marlène Schiappa	LREM
	Secretary of State for Disabled People	Prime Minister	Sophie Cluzel	LREM
Mounir Mahjoubi	Secretary of State for the Digital Sector	Prime Minister	Mounir Mahjoubi	LREM

Preceded by Cazeneuve government	Government of France; May–June 2017	Succeeded by Second Philippe government
