= Philippe government =

Philippe Government may refer to:

- First Philippe government, the French government under President Emmanuel Macron from May to June 2017
- Second Philippe government, the French government under President Emmanuel Macron since June 2017
