= Fireworld (French company) =

Fireworld is a French company that marketed "Invisible PC spy software" based on browser history and Facebook profile. It received international attention after the launch of software that allows parents to spy on their children to discover their sexual orientation.

== History ==
The company received international media attention, including Gay Times and BBC News, Léa Marie translated the advertisement for Konbini: "How to be certain my son is gay. While most children are heterosexual, that's not the case for everyone, and while some are loud and proud about their homosexuality, some prefer to remain discreet. This article will help you determine whether or not your son is gay." French Secretary of State for Equality, Marlène Schiappa retweeted a post by L'Amicale des Jeunes du Refuge's, commenting that it showed that "homophobia and sexism have their roots in the same gender stereotypes. We will fight them together". Other "warning signs" listed by the company were: Taking good care of himself, preferring reading and the theater to sports, shyness, piercings and liking female singers and divas. Using software to spy on your child and to hack into his or her Facebook account is illegal under French law. A blog post from the company about the software states: "Family is fundamental... That’s why the sexual orientation of your children, directly responsible for the continuation of your family, is very important to you." The article makes no mention of female homosexuality.

== Public Backlash and Deletion ==
The article was deleted following significant public backlash. In response to the criticism, Fireworld stated that the article had been created solely for search engine optimization (SEO) purposes and was not intended to be read by humans. They went on to say, "We regret not having reflected on the consequences of this type of content...". "We sincerely apologise to all those who may have felt offended by this content," they added.

== Technical Details of the Software ==
Fireworld’s spyware allowed users to view and control computer activity remotely, log keystrokes, and capture screenshots.

== “Clues” Suggested by Fireworld ==
The article listed clues that might cause a parent to suspect that their son might be gay. Some methods suggested by the article include "monitoring his Facebook use", seeing "if he has visited gay forums" and "spying on his private messages".

== Legalities ==
It is illegal in France to install spyware on a person's device in order to monitor it, without their knowledge.
