= Anna Cabana =

French journalist

- Born: Anna Bitton; 6 August 1979 (age 46); Montpellier, France
- Occupations: Journalist and author
- Spouse(s): Yves Cabana (divorced); Jean-Michel Blanquer (m. 2022)

Anna Cabana (born Anna Bitton; 6 August 1979 in Montpellier) is a French journalist and writer.

== Journalism career ==
Cabana started her career as a political journalist at the weekly Marianne under the leadership of her mentor Nicolas Domenach. She spent five years there between 2002 and 2007.

Following that, she became international correspondent at Le Point. On 11 February 2010, she received the Louis Hachette prize for her article "Sarkozy-Villepin, histoire secrète d'une haine" (Sarkozy-Villepin, secret history of a hate), which appeared in Le Point on 10 September 2009.

In August 2016, she joined the editorial board of Le Journal du Dimanche as the chief political editor.

Since 2013, she has been part of the editorial team of BFM TV.

Since January 2011, she has, at the same time, been a columnist at Le Télégramme in Brest. She writes an opinion piece each week for this publication called "Les Carnets d'Anna Cabana".

Since September 2017, she also hosts a daily TV programme on I24 News, called "Conversations avec Anna Cabana".

== Literary career ==
She is an author of five essays on public and political figures. These have included works about Dominique de Villepin, Alain Juppé, François Hollande, Ségolène Royal, and Valérie Trierweiler.

In 2008, she published Cécilia (under the name of Anna Bitton) about Cécilia Attias. Attias initiated legal proceedings to stop the publication of the book, but was dismissed by the courts.

She is a member of the jury for the Prix du livre politique, which is awarded each year to the best publication of a political theme.

== Personal life ==
She is Jewish, and since 2009 has been married to Yves Cabana, who is the son of politician Camille Cabana. In 2020, the magazine Voici announced that she was in a relationship with Jean-Michel Blanquer.

== Publications ==
- Bitton, Anna (2008). Cécilia : Portrait (in French). Paris: Flammarion. ISBN 978-2-08-121288-6. OCLC 191813018.
- Cabana, Anna (2010). Villepin : la verticale du fou (in French). Paris: Flammarion. ISBN 978-2-08-123912-8. OCLC 503242731.
- Cabana, Anna (2011). Juppé : l'orgueil et la vengeance (in French). Paris: Flammarion. ISBN 978-2-08-068923-8. OCLC 757464282.
- Cabana, Anna; Rosencher, Anne (2012). Entre deux feux (in French). Paris: Bernard Grasset. ISBN 978-2-246-80287-7. OCLC 809834424.
- Cabana, Anna (2016). Quelques minutes de vérite (in French). Paris: Bernard Grasset. ISBN 978-2-246-85158-5. OCLC 946472170.
- Cabana, Anna (2016). Un fantasme nommé Juppe (in French). Paris: Stock. ISBN 978-2-234-08245-8. OCLC 960977736.
- Cabana, Anna (2010). Inapte à dormir seule (in French). Paris: Grasset. ISBN 978-2-246-77031-2. OCLC 607473029.
