= Alain Griset =

French politician

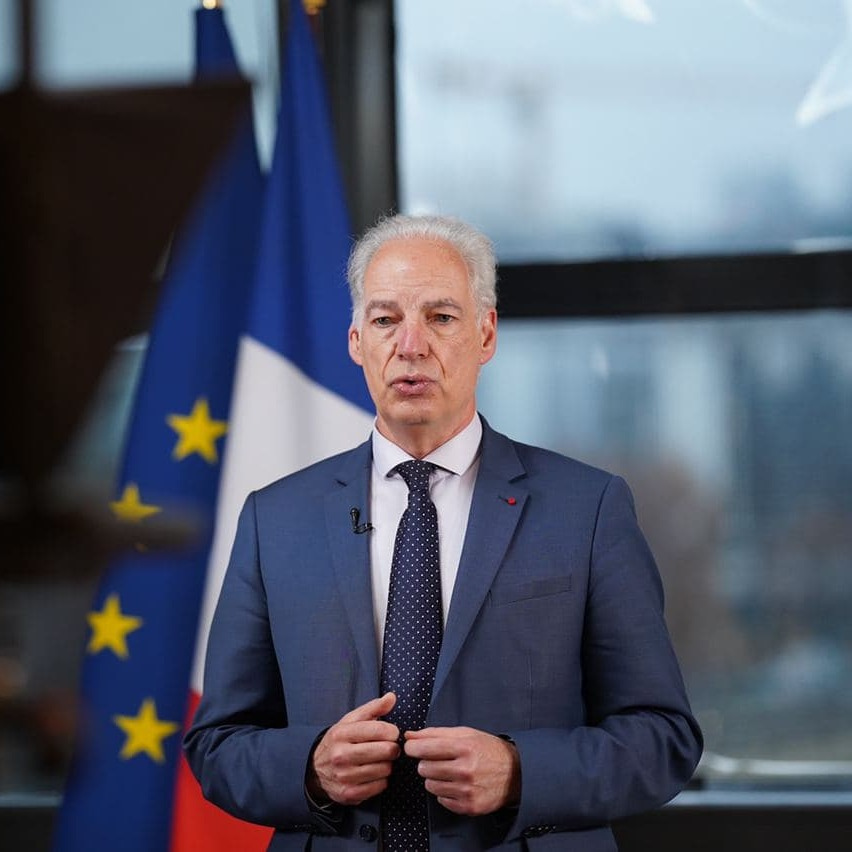

Minister Delegate in charge of Small and Medium-Sized Entreprises
- In office 6 July 2020 – 8 December 2021
- Prime Minister: Jean Castex
- Preceded by: Position established

Personal details
- Born: 30 May 1953 (age 72) Faches-Thumesnil, France
- Party: Independent
- Awards: Legion of Honour

Alain Griset (French pronunciation: [alɛ̃ ɡʁizɛ]; born 30 May 1953) is a French businessman, politician and former taxi driver who briefly served as Minister Delegate in charge of Small and Medium-Sized Entreprises attached to the Ministry of the Economy, Finance and Recovery in the government of Prime Minister Jean Castex from 2020 to 2021. On 8 December 2021 Griset announced his resignation from the government after being found guilty of underpayment of taxes.

== Early life and career ==
Alain Griset was born on 30 May 1953 in a working-class family in Faches-Thumesnil, Northern France. His father was a metal worker and his mother a stay-at-home mom. At 19 he started working as a switchboard operator in a taxi company after failing his Baccalauréat in mechanical manufacturing, he passed the taxi exam at 21 and started working as a driver. In 1975 he created his own taxi company in Lille; he then settled in Maubeuge then Tourcoing and finally Douai.

In 1989, Griset was elected to the Chamber of Trades and Crafts of Northern France in 1995, he became its president. In 2005 the body changed to Chamber of Trades and Crafts of the Nord-Pas-de-Calais region and he became its president.

== Political career ==
On 6 July 2020, after the appointment of Jean Castex as Prime Minister, Griset was appointed Minister Delegate in charge of Small and Medium-Sized Entreprises, attached to the Minister of the Economy, Bruno Le Maire. After being found guilty of underpayment of taxes, Griset announced his resignation from the government on 8 December 2021.

== See also ==
- Castex Government

== Sources ==
- "Alain Griset, the spokesperson for artisans, settles in Bercy". Web24. 13 July 2020.
- "Économie - Le ministre Alain Griset à Nevers : "La digitalisation doit être un complément, pas remplacer le commerce physique"". Le Journal du Centre (in French). 15 December 2020.
- "Compte bancaire : le ministre aux PME Alain Griset visé par deux enquêtes". La Tribune (in French). 15 December 2020.
- "Alain Griset : " Face à la crise, l'objectif du gouvernement est d'accompagner toutes les entreprises, quelle que soit leur situation "". Le Monde.fr (in French). 20 November 2020.
