= Najat Vallaud-Belkacem =

French politician (born 1977)

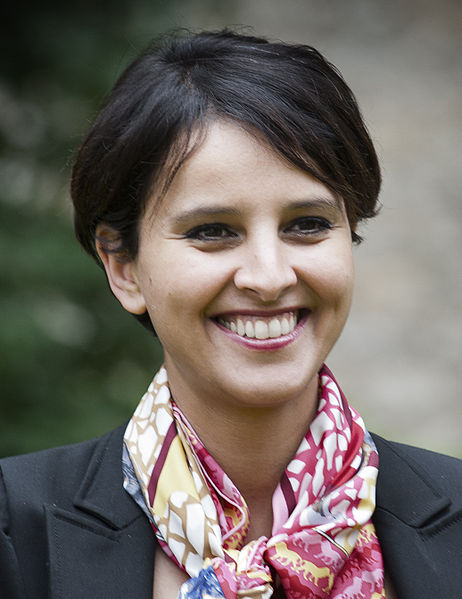

Minister of National Education, Higher Education and Research
- In office 27 August 2014 – 10 May 2017
- President: François Hollande
- Prime Minister: Manuel Valls; Bernard Cazeneuve
- Preceded by: Benoît Hamon
- Succeeded by: Jean-Michel Blanquer (National Education); Frédérique Vidal (Higher Education and Research)

Minister of City Affairs, Youth and Sports
- In office 2 April 2014 – 25 August 2014
- President: François Hollande
- Prime Minister: Manuel Valls
- Preceded by: Herself
- Succeeded by: Patrick Kanner

Minister of Women's Rights, City Affairs, Youth and Sports
- In office 16 May 2012 – 31 March 2014
- President: François Hollande
- Prime Minister: Jean-Marc Ayrault
- Preceded by: Catherine Vautrin (indirectly, Women's Rights); François Lamy (City Affairs); Valérie Fourneyron (Youth and Sports)
- Succeeded by: Herself (City Affairs, Youth and Sports; Pascale Boistard (Women's Rights)

Government's spokesperson
- In office 16 May 2012 – 31 March 2014
- President: François Hollande
- Prime Minister: Jean-Marc Ayrault
- Preceded by: Valérie Pécresse
- Succeeded by: Stéphane Le Foll

Member of the Regional Council of Auvergne-Rhône-Alpes
- Incumbent
- Assumed office 2 July 2021
- President: Laurent Wauquiez
- Constituency: Metropolis of Lyon

Deputy Mayor of Lyon (in charge of events, youth and community work
- In office 21 March 2008 – 22 June 2012
- Mayor: Gérard Collomb
- Preceded by: Pascale Bonniel-Chalier (events); Louis Pelaez (youth and community work)
- Succeeded by: Georges Képénékian (events); Anne Brugnera (youth and community work)

Member of the Regional Council of Rhône-Alpes
- In office 28 March 2004 – 12 June 2008
- President: Jean-Jack Queyranne
- Preceded by: Bernadette Laclais (indirectly)
- Succeeded by: Yvon Deschamps

Member of the General Council of the Rhône department
- In office 16 March 2008 – 31 December 2014
- President: Michel Mercier; Danielle Chuzeville
- Preceded by: Jean Flacher
- Succeeded by: Canton suppressed
- Constituency: Canton of Lyon-XIII

Personal details
- Born: Najat Belkacem; 4 October 1977 (age 49) Rif, Bni Chiker, Nador, Morocco
- Party: Socialist Party
- Spouse: Boris Vallaud (m. 2005)
- Children: Louis-Adel Vallaud; Nour-Chloé Vallaud
- Education: Sciences Po
- Profession: Jurist

Najat Vallaud-Belkacem (French pronunciation: [naʒat valo bɛlkasɛm]; Arabic: نجاة فالو بلقاسم; Riffian-Berber: ⵏⴰⵊⴰⵜ ⴱⵍⵇⴰⵙⵎ; born 4 October 1977) is a Moroccan-born French former politician and jurist. A member of the Socialist Party (PS), serving in a number of ministerial positions during the presidency of François Hollande. She was the first woman to serve as Minister of Education, Higher Education, and Research, holding the position from 2014 to 2017 under Prime Ministers Manuel Valls and Bernard Cazeneuve.

In 2014, opinion polling found Vallaud-Belkacem to be among the most popular politicians in the country. Since 2020, she has been the director of the One Campaign in France.

== Early life and education ==
Second in a family of seven children, Vallaud-Belkacem was born on 4 October 1977 in the Moroccan countryside in Bni Chiker, a village near Nador in the Rif region. Her grandmothers were respectively Algerian and Spanish, both married to Moroccans. She spent her early years growing up on her grandparents' farm.

In 1982 Vallaud-Belkacem joined her father, a construction worker, with her mother and elder sister Fatiha. From then on, she grew up in a poor neighborhood of Abbeville, a town in northern France, and then in a suburb of Amiens. She got French nationality at 18.

Vallaud-Belkacem graduated from the Institut d'études politiques de Paris (Sciences Po Paris) in 2002. At Sciences Po, she met Boris Vallaud, whom she married on 27 August 2005.

== Career in local politics ==
Vallaud-Belkacem joined the Socialist Party in 2002 and the team of Lyon mayor Gérard Collomb in 2003, leading actions to strengthen local democracy, the fight against discrimination, promotion of citizen rights, and access to employment and housing.

Elected to the Regional Council of Rhone-Alpes in 2004, she chaired the Culture Commission until she resigned in 2008. In 2005, she became adviser to the Socialist Party. In 2005 and 2006 she was a columnist for the cultural programme C'est tout vu on Télé Lyon Municipale alongside Stéphane Cayrol.

In March 2008 Vallaud-Belkacem was elected conseillère générale of the Rhône department in the cantonal elections with 58.52% of the votes in the second round, under the banner of the Socialist Party in the canton of Lyon-XIII. From 2008 until 2014, she also served as a councillor of the city of Lyon, responsible for major events, youth and community life.

== Career in national politics ==
In February 2007, Vallaud-Belkacem joined Ségolène Royal's presidential campaign team as a spokeswoman, serving alongside Vincent Peillon and Arnaud Montebourg. In 2009, Vallaud-Belkacem once again served as Royal's spokesperson ahead of the 2011 French Socialist Party presidential primary, this time alongside Delphine Batho. Following François Hollande's victory in the presidential primary, Vallaud-Belkacem became his campaign spokeswoman for the 2012 presidential election.

=== Early ministerial career ===
On 16 May 2012, Vallaud-Belkacem was appointed by President Hollande as Minister of Women's Rights and spokeswoman for the government in the Ayrault government and later in the First Valls Government. In the First Valls Government, she subsequently served as Minister of City Affairs (2 April 2012 to 25 August 2014) and Minister of Youth Affairs and Sports (2 April 2012 to 25 August 2014).

In her capacity as minister, Vallaud-Belkacem made headlines in 2012 when she introduced anti-sexism courses with presentations on stereotyping, inappropriate language, wage disparity and domestic violence for her fellow cabinet members. That same year, she announced that she wanted to abolish prostitution in France and in Europe; following her initiative, the National Assembly later voted in favour to give France some of the most restrictive legislation on prostitution in Europe.

In 2013, she declared as officially revoked an old bylaw requiring women in Paris to ask permission from city authorities before "dressing as men", including wearing trousers (with exceptions for those "holding a bicycle handlebar or the reins of a horse").

=== Minister of Education, Higher Education and Research (2014-2017) ===
Vallaud-Belkacem was chosen to serve as Minister of Education, Higher Education, and Research on 27 August 2014, becoming the first woman to hold the role.

In late 2014, shortly after her appointment as Minister of Education, Higher Education and Research, opinion polls ranked Vallaud-Belkacem only second in popularity among French politicians, after Alain Juppé. In early 2015, The New York Times described her as "one of the rising stars" within her party. By the end of Hollande's presidency, she was one of the few officials who had been a member of his various governments throughout his time in office.

After 15 years in public office, Vallaud-Belkacem decided to take a break from politics in June 2017. She supported the presidential campaign of Benoît Hamon in the 2017 French presidential election. Despite speculation, she announced that she would not seek the leadership of the Socialist Party at the Aubervilliers Congress in 2018. Instead, she publicly endorsed Olivier Faure as new chairman.

== Career outside politics ==
In March 2018, Vallaud-Belkacem joined research and polling firm Ipsos as CEO of its Global Affairs division. The department carries out research (on impact, public policy evaluation...) that helps international institutions, NGOs, international foundations and other actors which act in the global public interest better make decisions.

After two years at Ipsos, Vallaud-Belkacem announced in 2020 that she would be joining the One Campaign as director for France. In addition, she became the president of France terre d’asile in 2022.

In addition, Vallaud-Belkacem launched and co-directs the Gender Equality and Public Policy programme at the Paris Institute of Political Studies. She also heads Raison de Plus, a collection of progressive essays published by Fayard.

In 2020, Vallaud-Belkacem was appointed as an affiliated professor at the Mohammed VI Polytechnic University in Ben Guerir, Morocco.

== Other activities ==
- More in Common, Member of the Global Board
- Tent Partnership for Refugees, Co-chair of the Advisory Council

== Political positions ==
Vallaud-Belkacem supports having the French government force Twitter to filter out hate speech that is illegal under French law, such as speech that is homophobic. Regarding same-sex marriage in France, she has stated that its legalisation is a matter of "historic progress".

In 2016, Vallaud-Belkacem was publicly criticized by Prime Minister Manuel Valls after she spoke out against the government's local decrees that ban women from wearing full-body swimsuits – so-called burkinis – on the beach, arguing the ban was "dangerous for national cohesion."

== Personal attacks ==
In 2015, former president Nicolas Sarkozy was criticized for appealing to racist sentiments when he, without using explicitly racist words, singled out the two non-white female ministers – Vallaud-Belkacem and Christiane Taubira – in a largely white government for charges of gross incompetence.

== Personal life ==
In 2000, Belkacem met her husband, Boris Vallaud, at Sciences Po Paris where they were both studying. The pair married on 27 August 2005 in Hontanx, and Belkacem officially hyphenated her husband's family name in front of hers. In 2008, the couple welcomed twins, a boy and a girl: Louis-Adel and Nour-Chloé. As a symbol of the couple's mixed origins, the twins' names each contain one French and one North-African name.

Vallaud-Belkacem describes herself as a "non-practicing Muslim".

== Works ==
- Vallaud-Belkacem, Najat (2012). Raison de plus!. Paris: Fayard. ISBN 9782213666440. OCLC 793485794.
- Vallaud-Belkacem, Najat (2017). La vie a plus d'imagination que toi. Paris: Bernard Grasset. ISBN 9782246863847. OCLC 974793443.

Political offices
Preceded by Benoît Hamon	Minister of National Education; 2014-2017	Succeeded by Jean-Michel Blanquer
