= Nicolas Hulot =

French journalist and environmental activist

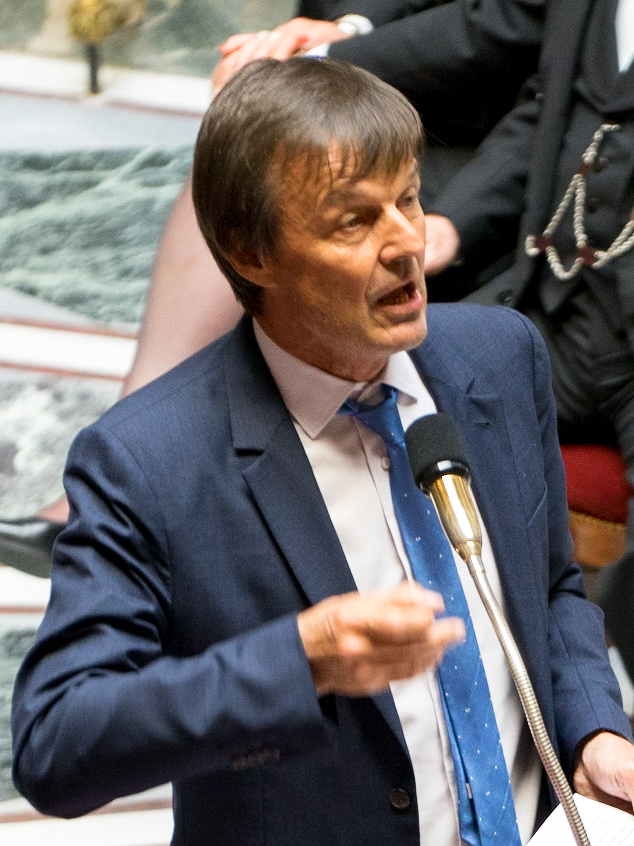

Minister of State, Minister of Ecological and Solidary Transition
- In office 17 May 2017 – 4 September 2018
- Prime Minister: Édouard Philippe
- Preceded by: Ségolène Royal (Ecology, Sustainable Development and Energy)
- Succeeded by: François de Rugy

Personal details
- Born: 30 April 1955 (age 71) Lille, France
- Occupation: Journalist, writer, environmentalist

Nicolas Jacques André Hulot (French: [nikɔla ʒak ɑ̃dʁe ylo]; born 30 April 1955) is a French journalist and environmental activist. He is the founder and honorary president of the Nicolas Hulot Foundation, an environmental group established in 1990.

Hulot ran as a candidate in the primary for the Europe Ecology – The Greens (EELV) party in 2011, but lost to Eva Joly in the second round. He declined offers to be a government minister for Jacques Chirac, Nicolas Sarkozy and François Hollande, but in May 2017, he agreed to serve under Emmanuel Macron and was appointed Minister of Ecological and Solidary Transition in the first government of Prime Minister Édouard Philippe. In August 2018, he announced his resignation from the Second Philippe government, citing policy disagreements and leadership issues.

Hulot is an officer in the Legion of Honour and a knight in the Ordre des Arts et des Lettres. In 2021, he announced his retirement from public life in response to a documentary outlining a series of sexual assault allegations against him.

== Early life ==
Hulot was born 30 April 1955 in Lille to Monique Marguerite Marie Hulot (née Moulun), a pharmaceutical sales representative, and Philippe Marie Joseph Hulot, a gold miner in Venezuela. Hulot had one brother, Gonzaga, and a sister, Beatrice.

Hulot's father Philippe died when Hulot was fifteen years old. Gonzaga Hulot committed suicide on 24 December 1974 when Hulot was 19 years old.

Hulot took up rallying as a hobby when he was growing up and took part in the 1980 Dakar Rally, though he didn't finish the race due to difficulties with his vehicle.

== Early career ==
From 1973 to 1978, Hulot worked as an agency photographer for Sipa Press where he documented the 1976 Guatemala earthquake and interviewed Ian Smith during the Rhodesian Bush War.

Hulot left Sipa Press in 1978 to move to France Inter after being offered work as a radio journalist and producer. Hulot debuted on television during the children's program Les Visiteurs du mercredi. Hulot also presented the short-lived educational programme Les Pieds au mur. Following this, Hulot became an evening reporter focusing on motorcycle events. Hulot left France Inter in 1987.

Hulot presented the television programme, Ushuaïa, le magazine de l'extrême which was focused around extreme sport and natural landscapes throughout the world. The programme was broadcast on TF1 and was co-produced by Hulot's then-girlfriend Dominique Cantien. Ushuaïa, le magazine de l'extrême made Hulot a household name in France. Ushuaïa, le magazine de l'extrême ran from 1987 to 1995. Hulot went on to present Opération Okavango (1996–1997) and Ushuaïa Nature (1998–2012). Hulot's contract with TF1 ended in December 2011 though four of the remaining Ushuaïa Nature episodes aired in 2012.

== Fondation Nicolas Hulot ==
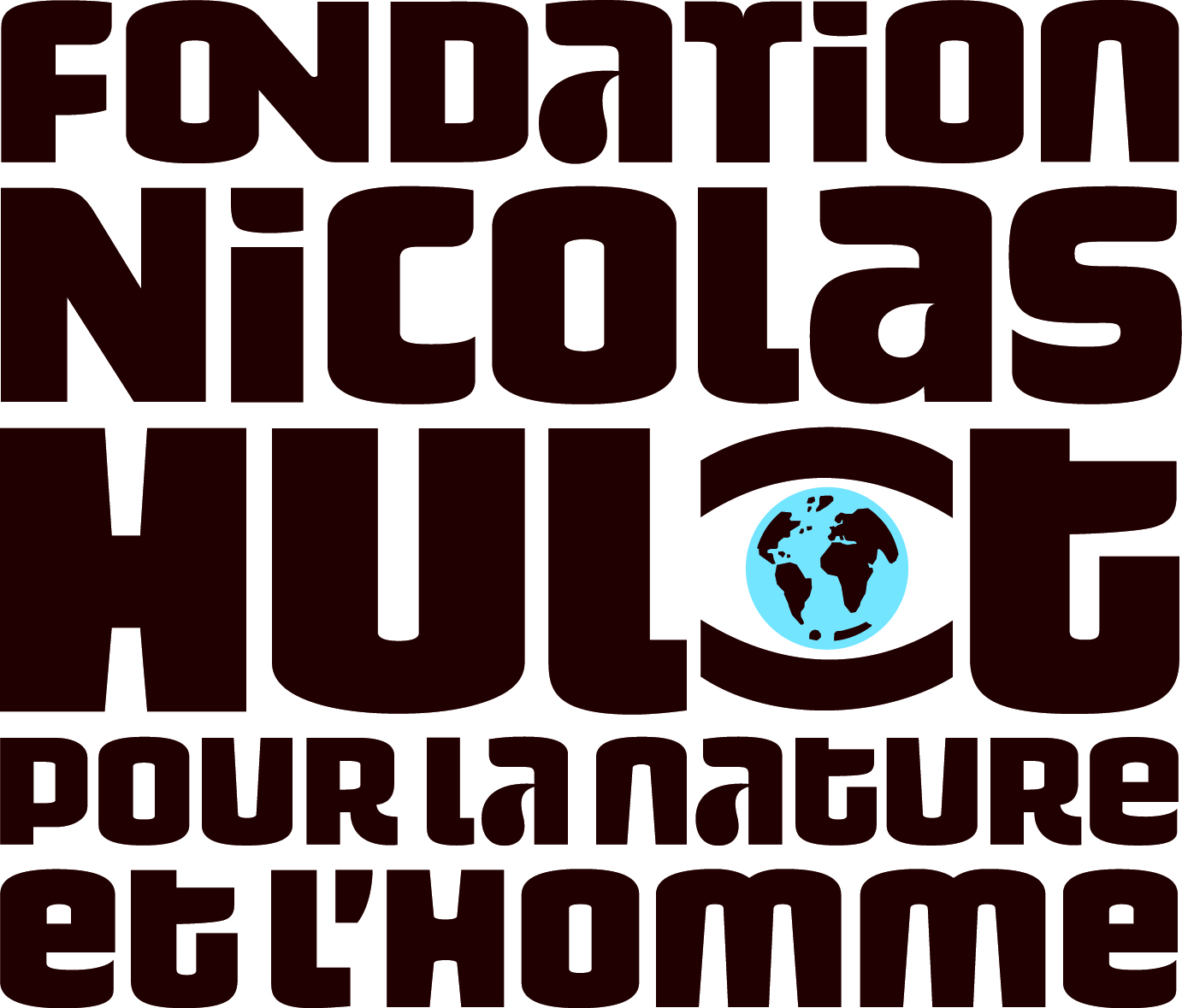
Logo of the Nicolas Hulot Foundation for Nature and Man

In 1990, Hulot founded the Ushuaia Foundation which became La Fondation Nicolas-Hulot pour la nature et l'homme in 1995 and which changed its name to La Fondation pour la nature et l'homme (The Foundation for Nature and Mankind) in April 2011.

Hulot and Gérard Feldzer, a former French airline pilot, experimented with airship prototypes originally developed by Didier Costes in 1992, and in 1993, the pair attempted to cross the Atlantic Ocean from Spain using an airship with pedals. The pair made it as far as 1,500 km before failing near the Cape Verde Islands.

Hulot set up partnerships for the Foundation with companies such as EDF, L'Oréal and TF1. In 2006, the National Museum of Natural History formed a partnership with La Fondation pour la nature et l'homme, organising annual events to bring people together to combat climate change.

In 2013, the foundation launched a think tank based around ecology.

== Political activities ==
In 2007, Nicolas Hulot told candidates in the presidential election that he would stand as a candidate if ecology were not one of the main themes of the election. Some polls estimated his support at around 15%. In response to his announcement, five of the twelve candidates in the election, including Nicolas Sarkozy, signed his Pacte écologique (ecology pact), stating that ecological issues would be central to all future political decisions.

=== 2011 Europe Écologie-Les Verts primary ===
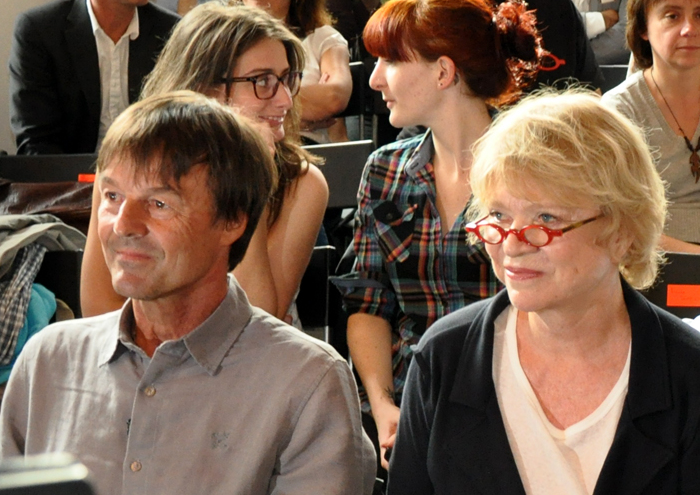
Hulot and Eva Joly in 2012

On 13 April 2011, while speaking in Sevran, Seine-Saint-Denis, Nicolas Hulot announced his candidacy in the Europe Écologie-Les Verts primary for the 2012 French presidential election. The announcement came a month after Hulot's calls for a referendum on nuclear energy following the Fukushima nuclear accident. Hulot was invited to a televised interview on the France Inter show 7/9 by Bruno Duvic.

Before the first round of the primary, some polls put Hulot ahead of Eva Joly, but he finally finished second with 40.22%, behind Joly with 49.75%. Hulot lost during the second round and Joly became the Europe Ecologie-Les Verts candidate.

For the French presidential election of 2012, Nicolas Hulot stated that he had voted for the Left Front's candidate, Jean-Luc Mélenchon, during the first round. He said he found Melenchon more efficient on environmental issues than Joly. He supported François Hollande in the second round.

=== Minister for the Ecological and Inclusive Transition ===
On 17 May 2017, he was appointed Minister for the Ecological and Inclusive Transition. This is following Hulot turning down offers for ministerial positions from Jacques Chirac, Nicolas Sarkozy and François Hollande's governments. The position's responsibilities are focused around climate, air pollution, energy and transport. (The latter being done in collaboration with Transport minister, Élisabeth Borne.)

On 24 June 2017, he joined Emmanuel Macron in calling for the adoption of a Global Pact for the Environment along with public figures such as Laurent Fabius, Anne Hidalgo, Arnold Schwarzenegger, and Ban Ki-moon.

On 6 July 2017, Hulot announced the government's five-year plan to outlaw all petrol and diesel vehicles by 2040. The plan would also attempt to make France carbon-neutral by 2050. Financial incentives would be offered to people who try to look for cleaner alternatives. This followed a proposal by Norway to ban all petrol and diesel vehicle sales by 2025.

On 10 July 2017, Hulot said on RTL Radio that France may close up to 17 nuclear reactors by 2025 in a new plan to reduce its share of nuclear power. Liberal think-tank Institut Montaigne released a report stating that the plan to convert from nuclear energy to wind and solar will cost €217 billion by 2035. In 2016, France's Court of Audit estimated that prolonging the lifespan of France's nuclear reactors would cost €100 billion. France currently derives 75 percent of its electricity from nuclear power.

In December 2017, to combat global warming, France adopted a law banning new fossil fuel exploitation projects and closing current ones by 2040 in all of its territories, becoming the first country to schedule the end of fossil fuel exploitation.

On 28 August 2018, Hulot resigned as Minister of Ecology during a live interview on France Inter radio, citing President Emmanuel Macron's record on environmental issues and his own frustration over feeling alone in prioritising reform. He said that his time in office had been an "accumulation of disappointments", and that he did not want to "create the illusion that we're facing up to these challenges". The Guardian wrote that "Hulot's departure is a major blow to Macron and calls into question the president's credibility on the environment".

Nicolas Hulot received the title of Doctor Honoris Causa from the University of Mons in 2019.

== Assessment ==
Hulot has been criticised by some commentators, like Le Canard enchaîné and supporters of uneconomic growth and political ecology, who have criticised his use of the media and acceptance of funds from large firms, like EDF, L'Oréal and Rhône-Poulenc.

== Personal life ==
Hulot was in a relationship with Dominique Cantien, the TF1 director. Hulot married world champion rock-climber Isabelle Patissier in Saint-Malo on 2 September 1993. Hulot and Patissier divorced on 9 April 1996. Hulot remarried in Viens on 2 October 2002 to Florence Lasserre, a former municipal councillor and mother to his two sons.

In 2017, Hulot declared a personal wealth of over €7 million and stated he owned six cars.

=== Sexual assault allegations ===
In February 2018, French magazine Ebdo reported that Hulot had been accused of sexual assault, related to events that took place in the 1990s. The accuser was later reported to be Pascale Mitterrand, granddaughter of former President François Mitterrand. Mitterrand had filed a police report in 2008, but no judicial charges were laid because the statute of limitations had run out.

In 2021, French investigative news show Envoyé spécial announced that it would be releasing a documentary in which a further six women accused Hulot of assaulting them. Before the broadcast of the documentary, Hulot appeared on BFM TV to deny the allegations and to announce that he would be retiring from public life. The documentary was screened, in which four women detailed their allegations, and subsequently reported.

== Bibliography ==
- Ces enfants qui souffrent, published by PAC.
- Tabarly, 45 ans de défis, published by PAC.
- Les chemins de traverse, published by Lattès Paris, 1989, VLACC-number 00811951.
- Chasseurs de pôles (with Jean-François Chaigneau), published by Albin Michel.
- États d'âme, published by Lattès Paris, 1991 (ISBN 2-7096-0957-6).
- Questions de nature, published by Plon.
- À mes risques et plaisirs, published by Plon.
- Le syndrome du Titanic, published by Lgf, 01/2006 (ISBN 2-7021-3418-1).
- Pour un pacte écologique, published by Calmann-Levy, 11/2006 (ISBN 2-7021-3742-3).
- Osons ! Plaidoyer d’un homme libre, Les Liens qui Libèrent and Fondation Nicolas-Hulot pour la nature et l'homme, 2015 (ISBN 979-10-209-0319-8).
