= Delphine Gény-Stephann =

French politician and business executive

Secretary of State to the Minister of the Economy
- In office 24 November 2017 – 16 October 2018
- President: Emmanuel Macron
- Prime Minister: Édouard Philippe
- Preceded by: Benjamin Griveaux
- Succeeded by: Agnès Pannier-Runacher

Personal details
- Born: Delphine Gény; November 19, 1968 (age 57) Paris
- Party: Independent
- Education: École Polytechnique; École des Ponts ParisTech

Delphine Gény-Stephann, (French pronunciation: [dɛlfin ʒeni stefan]; née Gény, born 19 November 1968 in Paris) is a French politician, senior civil servant and business executive. She served as Secretary of State to the Minister of the Economy and Finance, Bruno Le Maire, from 24 November 2017 to 16 October 2018.

== Early life and education ==
Gény-Stephann is an engineer from the École Polytechnique and the École Nationale des Ponts et Chaussées. She is also a graduate of the MBA of the College of Engineers.

== Career ==
In 1994, Gény-Stephann joined the General Directorate of the Treasury of the Ministry of the Economy and Finance. Between 1999 and 2005, she headed the office at the Agence des participations de l'État. As part of her role in the General Directorate of the Treasury, she sat on the board of directors of several public companies.

In 1999, Gény-Stephann was appointed to represent the State on the board of directors of the Guarantee and Participation Management Company, the Euroméditerranée public development institution and the Défense Conseil International (DCI). From 1999 to 2001, she sat on the board of directors of the Defence region development board.

In 2001, Gény-Stephann represented the state on the board of directors of several companies in the defense sector, including SNPE, SNECMA, GIAT Industries and CIVI.POL Conseil. She is also appointed to the Board of Directors of La Française des Jeux.

In 2002, Gény-Stephann joined the board of directors of Arte, and in 2003, of France 3 before being replaced in 2004. Until her appointment to the government, she was Vice President of Planning and Strategy for Saint-Gobain.

On November 24, 2017, Gény-Stephann was appointed Secretary of State to the Minister of the Economy and Finance Bruno Le Maire, in Édouard Philippe's second government. She was unknown to the general public at the time of her appointment.

== Other activities ==
- Google Cloud Platform, Member of the European Advisory Board (since 2022)
- Électricité de France, Member of the Board of Directors (since 2022)
- Eagle Genomics, Non-Executive Member of the Board of Directors (since 2019)
- Thales Group, Member of the Board of Directors (-2018)

== Personal life ==
In 2018, Gény-Stephann's net worth was reported to be at 16 million euros.
