= Sibeth Ndiaye =

French politician (born 1979)

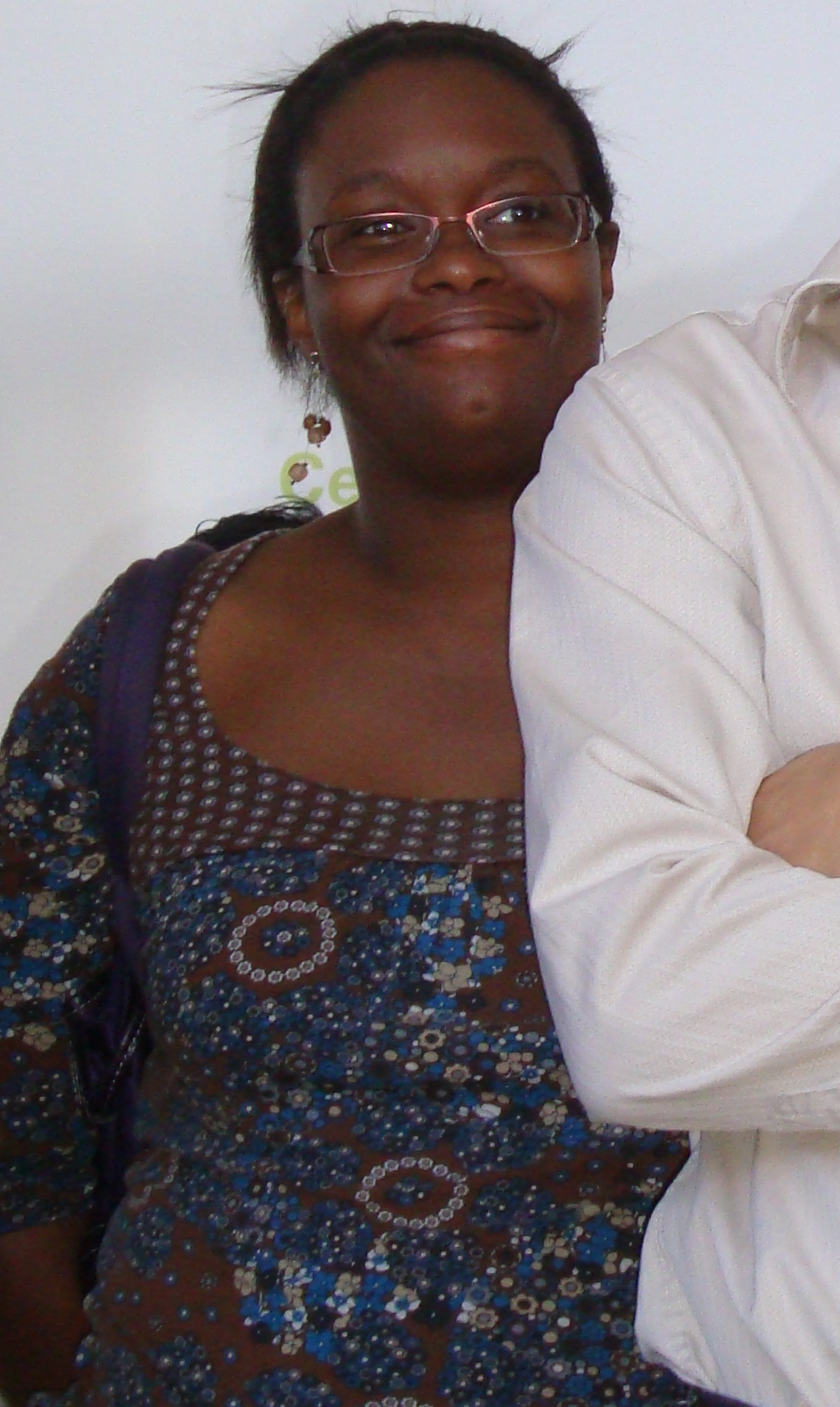

Spokesperson of the Government
- In office 1 April 2019 – 6 July 2020
- Prime Minister: Édouard Philippe
- Preceded by: Benjamin Griveaux
- Succeeded by: Gabriel Attal

Personal details
- Born: 13 December 1979 (age 46) Dakar, Senegal
- Party: La République En Marche!
- Spouse: Patrice Roques
- Children: 3
- Education: Lycée Montaigne
- Alma mater: Paris Diderot University; Pantheon-Sorbonne University
- Profession: Communications advisor

Sibeth Ndiaye (born 13 December 1979) is a French-Senegalese communications advisor who served as Spokesperson of the Government under Prime Minister Édouard Philippe from 1 April 2019 to 6 July 2020.

== Early life and education ==
Ndiaye was born in Dakar, Senegal. Her father, a legislator, was involved with the Senegalese Democratic Party and her German-Togolese mother was a high-ranking judge on the country's constitutional council. In 1995, she moved to France to study at the renowned Lycée Montaigne where she obtained a Baccalauréat in Science. She then studied at Paris Diderot University and Pantheon-Sorbonne University.

== Political career ==
From 2002, Ndiaye was a member of the Socialist Party (PS). Alongside Ismaël Emelien, Stanislas Guerini and Benjamin Griveaux, she later formed part of Dominique Strauss-Kahn's campaign team for the party’s primaries ahead of the 2007 presidential election.

In March 2008, Ndiaye was appointed head of the press department of Claude Bartolone, who had been newly elected as president of the Seine-Saint-Denis General Council. Also in 2008, she became the Socialist Party’s spokesperson for children’s affairs, under the leadership of chairwoman Martine Aubry. She later endorsed Aubry in the Socialist Party’s primaries for the 2012 presidential election.

After the election of François Hollande as President of France, Ndiaye joined the cabinet of Minister of the Economy and Finance Arnaud Montebourg as press and communication officer and kept this position when Macron succeeded Montebourg in 2014.

Ndiaye subsequently was in charge of Macron's press relations during the 2017 presidential election and joined his cabinet in the Élysée Palace after he was elected. From 1 April 2019 until 2020, she served as a Secretary of State to the office of the Prime Minister and Government Spokeswoman.

In late 2020, Ndiaye joined the staff of the LREM party.

In October 2020, Ndiaye was one of several current and former government officials whose home was searched by French authorities following complaints about the government's handling of the COVID-19 pandemic in France.

== Career in the private sector ==
Since 2021, Ndiaye has been serving as managing director of Adecco in France.

== Personal life ==
Ndiaye is married to Patrice Roques, a French senior official, and has 3 children. She became a naturalized French citizen in June 2016.
