= Spokesperson of the Government of France =

Ministerial position since 1969

Spokesperson of the Government
- Porte-parole du Gouvernement
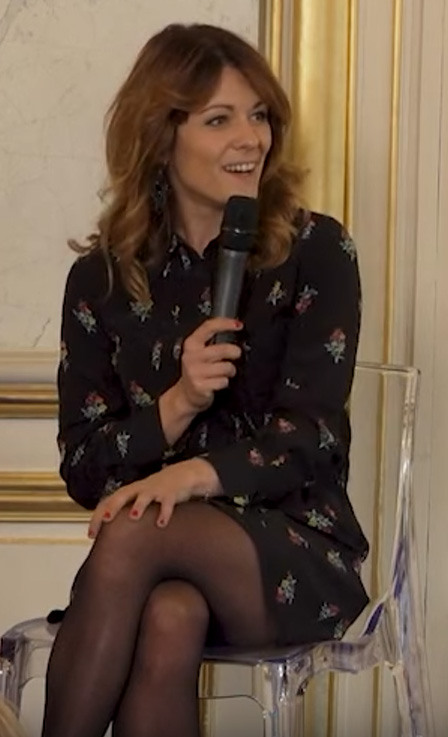
- Incumbent; Maud Bregeon since 12 October 2025
- Government of France
- Type: Spokesperson; Press secretary
- Status: Junior minister
- Member of: Council of Ministers
- Reports to: Prime Minister
- Seat: Hôtel de Castries, Paris
- Nominator: Prime Minister
- Appointer: President
- Precursor: Minister of Information
- Formation: 22 June 1969; 57 years ago
- First holder: Léo Hamon

The spokesperson of the Government (French: porte-parole du Gouvernment, in jargon PPG) is the minister in charge of the public relations of the Government of France.

The position has existed since 1969, with interruptions. It is held either concurrently with a departmental or junior portfolio, or alone with a sinecure rank of junior minister. Its best-known duty is to hold a press conference after the weekly Council of Ministers.

Maud Bregeon has held the position in the second Lecornu government since October 2025, with a rank of deputy minister under the prime minister.

== History ==
The position was created in 1969 by Jacques Chaban-Delmas, the first prime minister of Georges Pompidou; the first spokesman was Léo Hamon. (Note: Although Léo Hamon was announced as spokesman of the Government, his position as defined by the decree appointing the ministers was as secretary of state under the prime minister, as for his successor Jean-Philippe Lecat. Lecat’s title first appeared in an appointment decree with the next government in July 1972.) As part of Chaban-Delmas's liberalization platform, it came in partial replacement to the earlier position of minister of information, who had supervised the broadcasting services under state monopoly, and whose duties were transferred to the Office of the Prime Minister and to the Ministry of Cultural Affairs. The Ministry of Information was restored by Pierre Messmer, Chaban-Delmas's successor, but eventually disbanded for good in 1974.

Another new junior minister of 1969, Jacques Baumel, was put in charge of “public relations”, with an unclear distribution of responsibilities with Hamon. The position was discontinued in the next government, and the responsibilities of the spokesman were first defined in a decree of 24 July 1972 (“to report on the work of the Government and to provide information relating to the action of public authorities”). Léo Hamon was nicknamed “Léo Parleur” (“Loudspeaker”, a pun on “Léo speaker”).

All governments since 1983 have had a spokesperson, except for the 1st Rocard government (May–June 1988), in office fox six weeks between presidential and legislative elections, and for the Jospin government after a year (1998–2002). (Note: Catherine Trautmann (1997–1998) was discharged at her request in order to focus on her concurrent position of minister of culture, and the duties were assumed with no formal appointment by the minister for relations with Parliament (Daniel Vaillant, then Jean-Jack Queyranne).) While a number of holders until the 1990s were experienced figures, younger politicians have since then been frequently chosen; Nicolas Sarkozy (1993–1995), Jean-François Copé (2002–2007), and Gabriel Attal (2020–2022) used their term to raise their profile by intervening on a number of topics.

The president has at times had a spokesperson of his own, upgrading the position of press adviser; the most recent one was in 2017–2018. Some government departments have also appointed an official spokesperson.

== Appointment and position ==
The position of spokesperson is held either concurrently with a departmental or junior portfolio, or associated with a sinecure position of junior minister (deputy minister or secretary of state) under the prime minister. When junior to a departmental minister, the holder nonetheless reports directly to the prime minister with regard to the duties of spokesperson.

As for all other members of the government, the appointment, and removal, is by the president on the proposal of the prime minister. The choice is based on personal considerations rather than determined by a concurrent portfolio: the position has been held several times by the minister in charge of the Budget or of relations with Parliament due to their transverse role, but also by the minister in charge of agriculture, culture, education, or women's rights. Jean-François Copé kept the position for five years while moving between three departments.

The spokesperson has a specific private office, separate from one attached to an additional portfolio; it is located at the hôtel de Castries, in the 7th arrondissement of Paris. The office is supported by the Government Information Service (SIG), although the SIG remains under the authority of the prime minister.

== Responsibilities ==
The spokesperson has a dual role of “mouth and ear” of the Government, in charge not only of the usual responsibility of making public announcements and answering the news media, but also of staying attentive to public opinion and to report on it to the prime minister and other ministers.

To that end, the holder is required to keep abreast of the ongoing issues dealt with by all government departments, and works with some of the close advisers to the president and prime minister. The spokesperson takes part to a number of meetings at which government policy and strategy are discussed and decided, and advises on how to promote them to the media and the general public. Any intervention is bound by prior statements made by the prime minister and by the responsible ministers.

The spokesperson's best-known duty is to hold a press conference at the Élysée Palace, open to television cameras, after the meeting of the weekly Council of Ministers. Spokespersons also give regular interviews to explain and defend the government's handling of public affairs, either in general or on a specific current topic. Several former holders have commented on the uneasiness of the brief, such as François Baroin, who held it twice: “You can never be in a position to tell the whole truth. But I had made it my rule of never telling any sham. The job is after all about wooden language.” A 2021 book of interviews called it a “lightning rod”.

In light of the work involved, the spokesperson always attends the Council of Ministers by right, while most junior ministers only do when exceptionally summoned. It is the only minister who may take notes, which is by tradition forbidden to the others, although the president and the two senior civil servants who attend without taking part may do so.

== List ==
Holder and other position	Government	Term of office		Party
Presidency of Georges Pompidou
Léo Hamon; Secretary of State under the Prime Minister	Chaban-Delmas	22 June 1969	15 May 1972 (moved)	UDR
Jean-Philippe Lecat; Secretary of State under the Prime Minister	Chaban-Delmas; 1st Messmer	15 May 1972 (joined)	2 April 1973	UDR
Position in abeyance
Presidency of Valéry Giscard d'Estaing
André Rossi; Secretary of State under the Prime Minister	1st Chirac	8 June 1974	25 August 1976	CR
Position in abeyance
Presidency of François Mitterrand
Position in abeyance
Max Gallo; Secretary of State under the Prime Minister	3rd Mauroy	22 March 1983	18 June 1984 (resigned)	PS
Roland Dumas; Minister of European Affairs	3rd Mauroy; Fabius	18 June 1984 (additional portfolio)	7 December 1984 (other portfolio kept)	PS
Georgina Dufoix; Minister of Social Affairs and National Solidarity	Fabius	7 December 1984 (additional portfolio)	20 March 1986	PS
Alain Juppé; Deputy Minister for the Budget under the Minister of the Economy, Finance and Privatization	2nd Chirac	20 March 1986	10 May 1988	RPR
Position in abeyance
Claude Évin; Minister of Solidarity, Health and Social Protection	2nd Rocard	28 June 1988	14 September 1989 (other portfolio kept)	PS
Louis Le Pensec; Minister of Overseas Departments and Territories	2nd Rocard	14 September 1989 (additional portfolio)	15 May 1991	PS
Jack Lang; Minister of Culture and Communication	Cresson	16 May 1991	2 April 1992	PS
Martin Malvy; Secretary of State for Relations with Parliament under the Prime Minister	Bérégovoy	4 April 1992	2 October 1992 (moved)	PS
Louis Mermaz; Minister for Relations with Parliament	Bérégovoy	2 October 1992 (moved)	29 March 1993	PS
Nicolas Sarkozy; Minister for the Budget	Balladur	30 March 1993	19 January 1995 (other portfolio kept)	RPR
Philippe Douste-Blazy; Deputy Minister for Health under the Minister for Social Affairs, Health and Urban Affairs	Balladur	19 January 1995 (additional portfolio)	11 May 1995	UDF (CDS)
Presidency of Jacques Chirac
François Baroin (1st); Secretary of State under the Prime Minister	1st Juppé	18 May 1995	7 November 1995	RPR
Alain Lamassoure; Deputy Minister for the Budget under the Minister of the Economy and Finance	2nd Juppé	7 November 1995	2 June 1997	UDF (PR)
Catherine Trautmann; Minister of Culture and Communication	Jospin	4 June 1997	30 March 1998 (other portfolio kept)	PS
Position in abeyance
Jean-François Copé; Secretary of State for Relations with Parliament under the Prime Minister (2002–2004); Deputy Minister for the Interior under the Minister of the Interior, Homeland Security, and Local Liberties (March–November 2004); Deputy Minister for the Budget and Budget Reform under the Minister of the Economy, Finance and Industry (2004–2005); Deputy Minister for the Budget and Government Reform under the Minister of the Economy and Finance (2005–2007)	1st, 2nd, 3rd Raffarin; Villepin	7 May 2002	15 May 2007	UMP
Presidency of Nicolas Sarkozy
Christine Albanel; Minister of Culture and Communication	1st Fillon	18 May 2007	18 June 2007	UMP
Laurent Wauquiez; Secretary of State under the Prime Minister	2nd Fillon	19 June 2007	18 March 2008 (moved)	UMP
Luc Chatel; Secretary of State for Industry and Consumer Affairs under the Minister of the Economy, Industry and Employment (2008–2009); Minister of National Education (2009–2010)	2nd Fillon	18 March 2008 (moved)	13 November 2010	UMP
François Baroin (2nd); Minister for the Budget, Public Accounts, the Civil Service and Government Reform	3rd Fillon	14 November 2010	29 June 2011 (moved)	UMP
Valérie Pécresse; Minister for the Budget, Public Accounts and Government Reform	3rd Fillon	29 June 2011 (moved)	10 May 2012	UMP
Presidency of François Hollande
Najat Vallaud-Belkacem; Minister of Women’s Rights	1st–2nd Ayrault	16 May 2012	31 March 2014	PS
Stéphane Le Foll; Minister of Agriculture, Agrifood and Forestry	1st–2nd Valls; Cazeneuve	2 April 2014	10 May 2017	PS
Presidency of Emmanuel Macron
Christophe Castaner; Secretary of State for Relations with Parliament under the Prime Minister	1st–2nd Philippe	17 May 2017	24 November 2017 (other position kept)	LaREM
Benjamin Griveaux; Secretary of State under the Prime Minister	2nd Philippe	24 November 2017 (moved)	27 March 2019 (resigned)	LaREM
Sibeth Ndiaye; Secretary of State under the Prime Minister	2nd Philippe	31 March 2019 (joined)	3 July 2020	LaREM
Gabriel Attal; Secretary of State under the Prime Minister	Castex	6 July 2020	16 May 2022	LaREM
Olivia Grégoire; Secretary of State under the Prime Minister	Borne	20 May 2022	4 July 2022 (moved)	LaREM
Olivier Véran; Deputy Minister for Democratic Renewal under the Prime Minister	Borne	4 July 2022 (moved)	9 January 2024	LaREM
Olivier Véran; Deputy Minister for Democratic Renewal under the Prime Minister	Borne	4 July 2022 (moved)	9 January 2024	RE (renamed)
Prisca Thevenot; Deputy Minister for Democratic Renewal under the Prime Minister	Attal	11 January 2024	16 July 2024	RE
Maud Bregeon (1st); Deputy Minister under the Prime Minister	Barnier	21 September 2024	5 December 2024	RE
Sophie Primas; Deputy Minister under the Prime Minister	Bayrou	22 December 2024	9 September 2025	Independent
Aurore Bergé; Deputy Minister for Gender Equality and the Fight Against Discriminations under the Prime Minister	1st Lecornu	5 October 2025	6 October 2025	RE
Maud Bregeon (2nd); Deputy Minister under the Prime Minister; Jointly from 26 February 2026: Deputy Minister for Energy under the Ministry of Finance, the Economy and of Industrial, Energy and Digital Sovereignty	2nd Lecornu	12 October 2025	Incumbent	RE

== See also ==
- Minister of Information (France) – Earlier equivalent position (1938–1974)
- Category:Political spokespersons – Foreign counterparts
- Public relations

== Sources ==
- Le Bart, Christian (2022). "Porte-parole du gouvernement : un rôle impossible ?". In Hayat, Samuel; Kaciaf, Nicolas; Passard, Cédric (eds.). Le Porte-parole. Fondements et métamorphoses d'un rôle politique (in French). Villeneuve-d’Ascq: Presses universitaires du Septentrion. doi:10.4000/books.septentrion.131421. ISBN 978-2-7574-3714-8.
- Ollivier-Yaniv, Caroline (July–September 2019). "La communication gouvernementale, un ordre en négociation". Revue française d'administration publique (in French) (171). Strasbourg: École nationale d'administration: 669–680. doi:10.3917/rfap.171.0669. ISSN 0152-7401 – via Cairn.info.
- Saurat-Dubois, Anne (2021). Profession, paratonnerre (in French). Paris: L’Observatoire. ISBN 979-10-329-1753-4. – Based on interviews with former spokespersons.
