= Ministry of Women's Rights (France) =

Former government ministry of France

Agency overview
- Formed: July 17, 1974
- Type: Women's rights
- Headquarters: France
- Minister responsible: Françoise Giroud

The Ministry of Women's Rights (now a secretariat) was a ministry of the Government of France.

As of 2017 (under Macron and the Philippe Government), Marlène Schiappa is the Secretary of State of the new Secretariat of Equality between women and men department. Françoise Giroud was the Minister for Women's Affairs in the first prime ministership of Jacques Chirac.
