= Muriel Pénicaud =

French business executive and politician

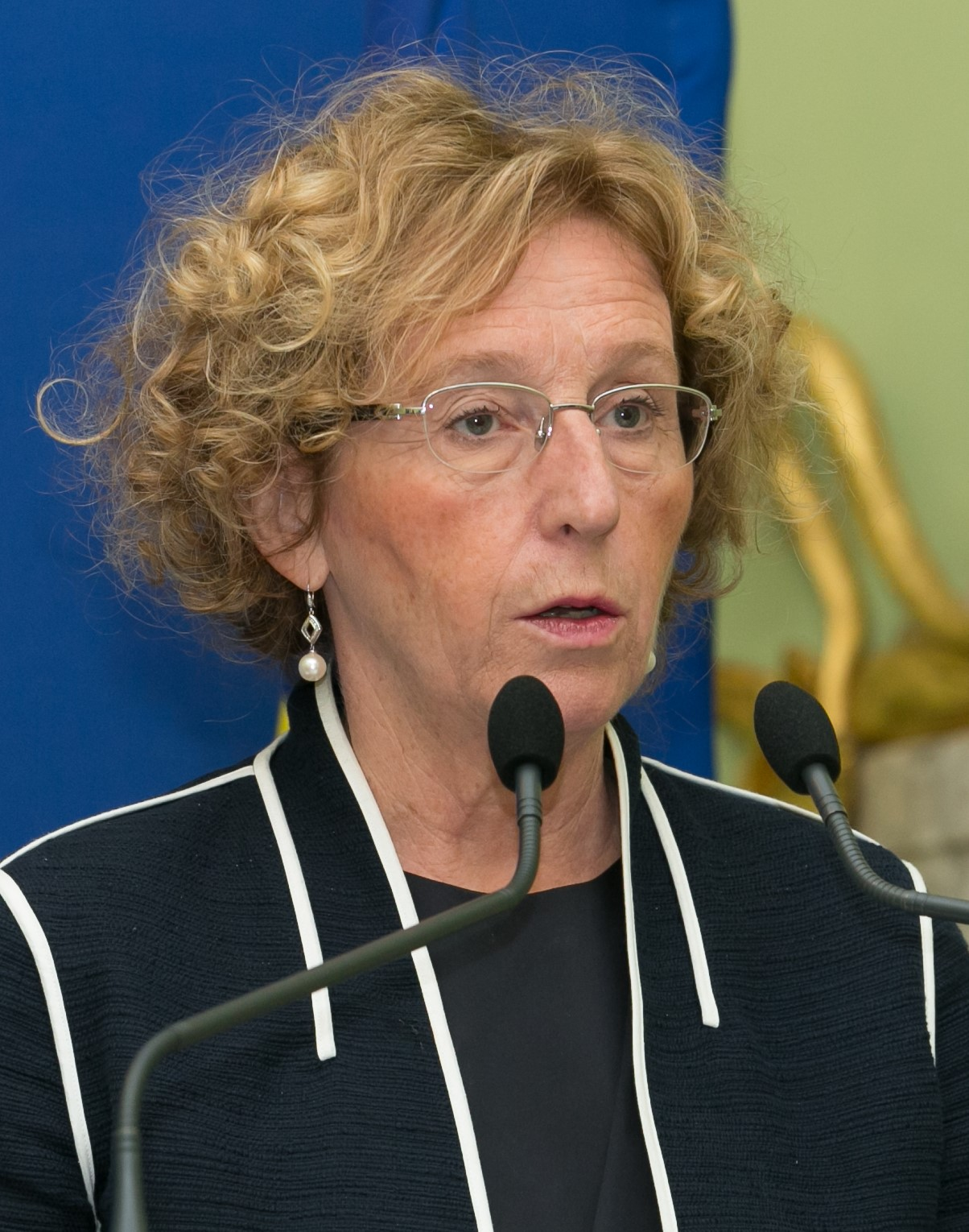

Minister of Labour
- In office 17 May 2017 – 6 July 2020
- President: Emmanuel Macron
- Prime Minister: Édouard Philippe
- Preceded by: Myriam El Khomri
- Succeeded by: Élisabeth Borne

Personal details
- Born: 31 March 1955 (age 71) Versailles, France
- Party: Renaissance
- Children: 2
- Education: Paris Nanterre University; University of Strasbourg; INSEAD

Muriel Pénicaud (born 31 March 1955) is a former French business executive and politician who served as Minister of Labour in the government of Prime Minister Édouard Philippe from 17 May 2017 to 6 July 2020.

In the private sector, Pénicaud was the executive vice president in charge of organization, human resources and sustainable development and an executive committee member at Dassault Systèmes from 2002 to 2008. She also was executive vice president in charge of human resources at Groupe Danone from 2008 to 2014.

After leaving government, Pénicaud served as Ambassador and Permanent Representative of France to the Organisation for Economic Co-operation and Development (OECD) from 2020 to 2022.

== Early life ==
A native of Versailles, Pénicaud was born on 31 March 1955. In 1975, she graduated from Paris Nanterre University with a bachelor's degree in history and a master's degree in Education sciences the following year. She completed her studies with a DEA (Post-graduate) in Clinical Psychology. She is an alumna of the INSEAD Business School Advanced Management Program for Executives (1995).

== Early career in the public sector ==
After starting her career as a local government administrator (1976-1980), Pénicaud held a number of management positions in non-profit organisations dedicated to young people (1981-1985). She worked as a regional administrator on job-training missions before moving to the French Minister of Labour from 1985 to 1993. She was an advisor to Minister Martine Aubry from 1991 to 1993.

== Career in the private sector ==
Pénicaud worked for Groupe Danone from 1993 to 2002. She was the executive vice-president in charge of organization, human resources and sustainable development for Dassault Systèmes from 2002 to 2008, and a member of the executive committee. She returned to the Groupe Danone in 2008, where she was executive vice-president in charge of human resources and social innovation and member of the executive committee under chairman Franck Riboud until 2014. During her time at Danone, she founded and produced the EVE Program to develop Women's leadership in business, and created "Dan'Cares" a program providing social protection for all employees worldwide.

She received between 2008 and 2014 more than 4.7 million euros of total gross compensation for this activity (including stock options).

Pénicaud was appointed as the French Ambassador for International Investment in May 2014, and became CEO of Business France on 1 January 2015. In this capacity, her responsibilities included prospecting international investments and helping French companies grow their exports in order to spur economic growth and create jobs.

By 2017, her personal wealth was at around 7.5 million euros ($8.8 million).

== Return to the public sector ==
=== Minister of Labour, 2017–2020 ===
Pénicaud was appointed as the French Minister of Labour in the government of Prime Minister Édouard Philippe on 17 May 2017 by President Emmanuel Macron. At the time of her appointment, she was seen as widely respected by the country's trade unions and employers organisations. During her time in office, France’s unemployment rate fell back in 2019 to reach its lowest level since the end of 2008. As Minister of Labour, she led several structural reforms that lead to a significant decrease of unemployment and inequality : the reform of the Labour law "For strengthening social dialogue" in 2017 and the law "For freedom to choose one's professional future" in 2018, which fostered apprenticeship, created a right for life-long learning for all workers through a personal training account, and enhanced equal pay between men and women through the creation of the Gender Equality Index. In addition, she negotiated several European directives, including the Posting of Workers Directive, under the principle "equal pay for equal work" (UE 2018/957).

She supported economic inclusion initiatives and launched massive training programs for unemployed and young people. She also oversaw the government's early measures in response to the COVID-19 pandemic in France, when around 7.8 million people were on temporary unemployment packages by the end of May 2020.

In 2019, as French Minister of Labour, Pénicaud chaired the "G7 Social" of Ministers of Labour and employment, ahead of the 45th G7 summit. It led to the adoption of an unprecedented tripartite declaration between G7 countries and international organizations of workers and employers, aiming to integrate international labour standards, reduct inequalities, and give access to social protection for all, worldwide. That same year, she conducted discussions leading to the adoption of an unprecedented joint statement signed by the heads of the IMF, the OECD and the ILO on the reduction of inequalities for sustainable development.

Pénicaud was particularly active in the negotiation of European directives, as well as the negotiation and adoption of international labour standards such as ILO Convention 190 on violence and harassment in the workplace.

=== Ambassador to the OECD, 2020–2022 ===
As Ambassador and Permanent Representative of France to the OECD from September 2020, Pénicaud carried the French initiative IPAC (International Program for Action on Climate) to support countries in measuring and implementing their commitments while taking into account the environmental, social and economic dimensions of the transition.

Pénicaud was also a member of the Global Commission on People-Centered Clean Energy Transitions of the International Energy Agency.

=== Candidacy for Director-General of the International Labor Organization, 2022 ===
Nominated by France's government in September 2021, Pénicaud was one of five candidates to succeed Guy Ryder as Director-General of the International Labor Organization in March 2022, alongside Gilbert Houngbo, Kang Kyung-wha, Mthunzi Mdwaba and Greg Vines. In the second round of voting, Pénicaud eventually lost against Houngbo.

== Other activities ==
Since 2016, Pénicaud has been a member of the International Planning Committee of the Global Summit of Women.

Pénicaud also founded the Sakura Fund, dedicated to supporting artists engaged in civil causes.

In 2021, Pénicaud launched an initiative called "Avenir des Jeunes" (Future of Young People), mobilizing civil society on a large scale in response to the short- and long-term impact of the pandemic on young people, first in France, then in OECD countries.

In May 2021, Pénicaud published her first essay, Pousser les murs (Éditions de l'Observatoire).

=== Corporate boards ===
- Galileo Global Education, Member of the Board (since 2022)
- ManpowerGroup, Member of the Board (since 2022)
- SNCF, Member of the board of directors and Chair of the Logistics Committee (2013–2015)
- Paris-Saclay, Member of the board of directors
- Aéroports de Paris, member of the board (2014–2017)
- Orange, Member of the board of directors and chair of the Environment, Social and Governance Committee (2011–2014)

=== Non-profit organizations ===
- National Institute for Labour, Employment and Vocational Training, chair of the board (2006–2009)
- AgroParisTech, chair of the Board

== Controversies ==
A formal investigation against Business France was opened in July 2017 into "possible favouritism" in awarding the organization of Business France technology event in Las Vegas to Havas public relations agency during Pénicaud's tenure. The French daily Libération claimed that Pénicaud was suspected of having provided a "truncated overview of the audit" to Business France's board of directors.

As a human resources director at Danone in the 1990s, Pénicaud made $1.4 million from stock options while cutting 900 jobs in Europe, according to Bloomberg.

== Personal life ==
Pénicaud has two children.

== Honours ==
Muriel Pénicaud was awarded the insignia of Chevalier de la Légion d’Honneur (Knight in the Order of the Légion d'honneur) on 30 January 2008, then Officier (Officer) on 13 November 2014.

She also is Commander if the Swedish Royal Order of the North Star.
