= Sylvie Goulard =

French politician and civil servant (born 1964)

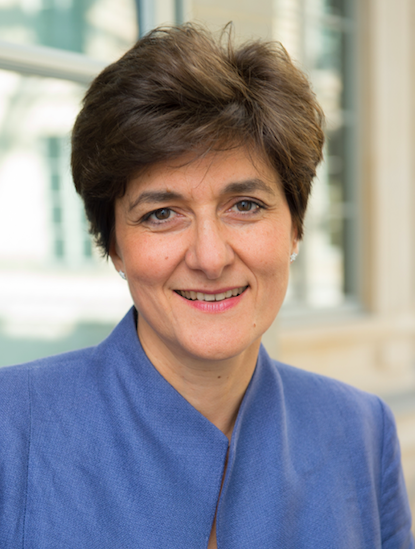
- Sylvie Goulard in 2019

Deputy Governor of the Banque de France
- In office 17 January 2018 – 2 December 2022
- Governor: François Villeroy de Galhau
- Preceded by: Denis Beau
- Succeeded by: Agnès Bénassy-Quéré

Minister of the Armed Forces
- In office 17 May 2017 – 21 June 2017
- Prime Minister: Édouard Philippe
- Preceded by: Jean-Yves Le Drian
- Succeeded by: Florence Parly

Member of the European Parliament
- In office 7 June 2009 – 17 May 2017
- Constituency: West France (2009–2014); South-East France (2014–2017)

Personal details
- Born: Sylvie Grassi; 6 December 1964 (age 61) Marseille, France
- Party: La République En Marche! (2017–present)
- Other political affiliations: Democratic Movement (2007–2017)
- Spouse: Guillaume Goulard
- Children: 3
- Education: Aix-Marseille University; Sciences Po; École nationale d'administration

Sylvie Goulard (French pronunciation: [silvi ɡulaʁ]; born 6 December 1964) is a French politician and civil servant who served as Deputy Governor of the Banque de France from 2018 to 2022.

Prior to this, Goulard briefly served as Minister of the Armed Forces from 17 May to 21 June 2017 in the First Philippe government.

A native of Marseille, Goulard served as a Member of the European Parliament (MEP) for West France from 2009 until 2014. She was reelected in the 2014 election for South-East France. As an MEP she was a member of the Committee for Economic and Monetary Affairs and an ALDE group coordinator, as well as a substitute member of the Committee on Agriculture and Rural Development between 2009 and 2014 and Committee on Constitutional Affairs between 2014 and 2017. In 2010 she participated in the creation of the Euro-federalist interparliamentarian Spinelli Group. She served as a foreign affairs advisor; Goulard also is a former president of the Mouvement européen-France, the oldest pluralist association defending the European ideal. In 2017, Goulard joined the newly formed En Marche! party.

== Early life and education ==
Goulard graduated with a law degree from the Université Paul Cézanne Aix-Marseille III and studied at both Sciences Po in Paris and the École nationale d'administration (ENA). Between 2005 and 2009 she taught at the College of Europe in Bruges. She speaks fluent English, German and Italian.

== Career ==
=== 1989–2001: civil service and research ===
Sylvie Goulard worked in the Legal Affairs Directorate of the French Ministry for Foreign Affairs from 1989 until 1999. She served in particular on the French team responsible for negotiating German reunification.

From 1993 to 1996, she worked at the Conseil d’État (State Council), after which she returned to the Policy Planning Department of the French Ministry for Foreign Affairs, where she was responsible for European issues in conjunction with the equivalent department of the German government.

From 1999 to 2001, she was an associate researcher at the French Centre de Recherches Internationales.

=== 2001–2004: political advisor to Romano Prodi ===
As a political advisor to Romano Prodi when he was president of the European Commission, from 2001 to 2004, Goulard followed the work of the convention presided by Valéry Giscard d'Estaing which was primarily made up of members of national parliaments, who had been charged by the European Council to draft a European constitution.

Goulard's work focuses on the necessity of pursuing European integration whilst also inviting increased public debate about European questions. Europe's citizens must become more engaged with its development in the future. They need to be informed and active: and to achieve this cultural and professional exchanges and learning foreign languages are essential.

=== 2006–2010: president of the Mouvement Européen-France (ME-F) ===
At the end of 2006 Goulard was elected president of the Mouvement Européen-France (ME-F), succeeding Pierre Moscovici, who had also been a candidate. She was re-elected as president in December 2008. Le Mouvement Européen-France regularly organises meetings, conferences and debates which aim are to enable a dialogue between political figures, experts and the general public.

=== 2009–2017: Member of the European Parliament ===
Goulard was first elected Member of the European Parliament in the 2009 elections. Throughout her time in parliament, she served on the Committee on Economic and Monetary Affairs. In 2009 became a substitute member of the Agriculture and Rural Development Committee and in 2014, she became a substitute member of the Committee on Constitutional Affairs. In that capacity, she served as rapporteur on budgetary surveillance in the Eurozone.

In addition to her committee assignments, Goulard served as chairwoman of the European Parliament Intergroup on "Extreme Poverty and Human Rights".

On 15 September 2010, Goulard supported the new initiative Spinelli Group, which was founded to reinvigorate the strive for federalisation of the European Union (EU). Other prominent supporters are: Daniel Cohn-Bendit, Guy Verhofstadt, Isabelle Durand as well as Jacques Delors, Joschka Fischer, Andrew Duff and Elmar Brok.

On the national level, François Bayrou included Goulard in his shadow cabinet in 2010; in this capacity, Goulard served as opposition counterpart to Ministry of European Affairs Laurent Wauquiez.

In November 2016, Goulard officially announced her candidacy for the office of President of the European Parliament; the post eventually went to Antonio Tajani.

During her time in parliament, Goulard continued to write regularly in a wide range of both French (Le Monde, La Croix, Libération) and international (Süddeutsche Zeitung, Financial Times particularly) newspapers.

=== 2017: Minister of the Armed Forces ===
Goulard was appointed by President Emmanuel Macron Minister of the Armed Forces on 17 May, in the First Government of Édouard Philippe. In this capacity, she ranked above her immediate predecessor and foreign minister Jean-Yves Le Drian in the government hierarchy. She was only the second woman to head the ministry, which reverted to its pre-1974 name of Ministry of the Armed Forces. Goulard was replaced by Florence Parly, a former executive and budget official, in the 21 June government reshuffle. She had stepped down after an inquiry over alleged misuse of payments for assistants in the European Parliament was opened on 20 June 2017.

=== 2018–2022: Deputy Governor of the Banque de France ===
On 17 January 2018, Goulard was appointed Deputy Governor of the Banque de France, succeeding Denis Beau. In 2020, she was also appointed by the World Health Organization’s Regional Office for Europe to serve as a member of the Pan-European Commission on Health and Sustainable Development, chaired by Mario Monti.

She is in charge of European and international topics, including preparations for G7 and G20 summits. She monitors issues relating to financial stability and financial risks, as well as green finance and gender equality. She has been outspoken on questions related to global warming, in particular citing the impact of climate change on financial stability and calling on the financial sector to shift massively “towards green investments”.

She has expressed support for the euro and the initiative launched by top banks to create a European Payments Initiative (EPI), with a view to promoting European sovereignty. She welcomed the disciplined budgetary approach of the so-called “frugal” European countries, which made it possible to implement the Economic Recovery Plan, as well as the 2021–2027 EU budget. She supports European competition policy, which she sees as beneficial to inhibit the emergence of monopolies, as well as to lower prices, promote consumer purchasing power and compel companies to innovate.

Goulard is also a member of the One Planet Lab.

=== 2019: Nomination to be France's European Commissioner ===
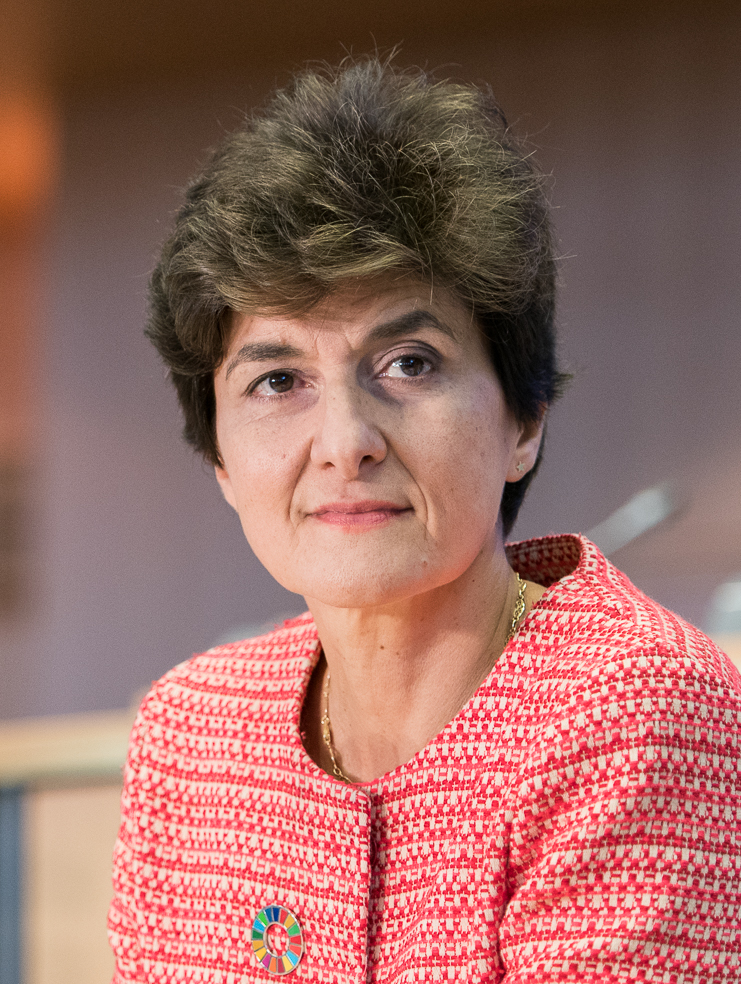
Hearing of Sylvie Goulard, candidate commissioner for internal market.

On 28 August 2019 President Macron nominated Goulard to be the French Commissioner in the von der Leyen Commission and lead the newly established Directorate-General for Defence Industry and Space

After two "tense" hearings before the EP Committee on Internal Market and Consumer Protection (IMCO) and the Committee on Industry, Research and Energy (ITRE), her nomination was rejected on 10 October 2019, with 82 votes against, 32 in favour and 1 abstention. The rejection was linked to her inability to explain her effective work for the Berggruen Institute, and the fact that she explained that she would not resign even if she was formally indicted.

The EPP group's MEPs showed strong animosity against the Goulard's nomination, related to ongoing investigations by the European Anti-Fraud Office. The group tweeted a message (later deleted) reading "Guys, we are going to kill her in the vote later but do not say until then" and attributed to Pedro López de Pablo, the director of communications of the group.

Many medias concluded that this was a blow for Emmanuel Macron's ambitions in Europe. Le Monde titled that this, after the previous Nathalie Loiseau failed leadership in the European parliament, was another consequence of the arrogance of the French President in Europe, and that the European parliament gave him a lesson about morality. On 21 October 2019, two dozen personalities from across Europe, including Robert Badinter, Silvia Costa, David Capitant, Étienne Davignon, Jacques de Larosière, Clemens Fuest, Jean-Paul Gauzès, Charles Grant, Miguel Poiares Maduro, Paolo Magri, Giampiero Massolo, Riccardo Perissich, Étienne Pflimlin, Jean-Marc Sauvé, Giuseppe Tesauro and Jean-Claude Trichet, co-signed a statement that the European Parliament was wrong to dismiss Sylvie Goulard.

On 29 November 2019, she was formally indicted for misappropriation of public funds. The case against Goulard was dropped in 2023, while it proceeded to a criminal trial for eleven others.

== Other activities ==
- Berlin-Brandenburg Institute for Franco-German Cooperation in Europe, member of the advisory board
- Berggruen Institute, special advisor from 2013 to 2016
- Centre d'Etudes Prospectives et d'Informations Internationales (CEPII), Member of the Board
- Centre for European Reform (CER), Member of the Advisory Board
- Deutsche Nationalstiftung, member of the senate
- Europartenaires, member of the board
- European Council on Foreign Relations (ECFR), member
- European Policy Centre (EPC), member of the advisory council
- Friends of Europe, member of the board of trustees
- Franco-German Institute (DFI), Member of the Board
- French Institute of International Relations (IFRI), member of the strategic advisory board
- Institute for European Politics (IEP), member of the scientific committee
- Jean Monnet Foundation for Europe, member of the board of trustees
- Leibniz Institute for Financial Research (SAFE), Member of the Policy Council
- Munich Security Conference Foundation, Member of the Foundation Council
- New Pact for Europe, member of the advisory group
- United Europe, member of the board of directors
- Stand Up For Europe, member of the support committee.

== Political positions ==
Goulard, a centrist, strongly supports NATO and the European Union, and holds hawkish views on the regimes of Vladimir Putin and Recep Tayyip Erdoğan. In 2004, before accession discussions were opened with Turkey, Goulard had taken a position in the debate citing concerns about the eventual enlargement of the European Union to include Turkey by underlining the necessity of preserving the European Union's political ambitions and its capacity to act. She also called for doubts of citizens, facing a European project whose direction they do not properly understand, to be taken seriously.

Following the 2014 elections, Goulard joined fellow MEPs Othmar Karas, Sven Giegold, Sophie in 't Veld and Alessia Mosca in an open letter aimed at exerting pressure on the President of the European Commission and national government leaders during the nominations process to improve the gender balance in the composition of the European Commission.

== Personal life ==
She is married to Guillaume Goulard, councilor of state, and is mother of three children.

She is the sister-in-law of François Goulard, president of the Morbihan departmental council in France.

== Decorations ==
- Knight of the National Order of Merit (2008)
- Officer's Cross of the Order of Merit (2017)

== Bibliography ==
- Le Grand Turc et la République de Venise, Fayard, 2004 Prix du livre pour l’Europe 2005.
- Le Partenariat privilégié, alternative à l’adhésion en collaboration avec Rudolf Scharping, Karl Theodor Freiherr zu Guttenberg, Pierre Defraigne, Carlo Altomonte, Lucas Delattre, Note bleue de la Fondation Schuman n^{o} 38, 6 décembre 2006
- Le Coq et la Perle, Seuil, février 2007
- L'Europe pour les nuls, First, 2007; 3^{e} édition, 2014 Prix du Livre européen de l'essai 2009.
- Il faut cultiver notre jardin européen, Seuil, juin 2008
- La Mondialisation pour les Nuls, de Francis Fontaine avec Brune de Bodman et Sylvie Goulard, First, 2010
- De la démocratie en Europe, avec Mario Monti, Flammarion, 2012
- Europe : amour ou chambre à part, Flammarion, 2013, coll. " Café Voltaire »
- Goodbye Europe, Flammarion, 2016

Political offices
Preceded by Jean-Yves Le Drian	Minister of the Armed Forces; 2017	Succeeded by Florence Parly
