= Jean-Michel Blanquer =

French politician and jurist (born 1964)

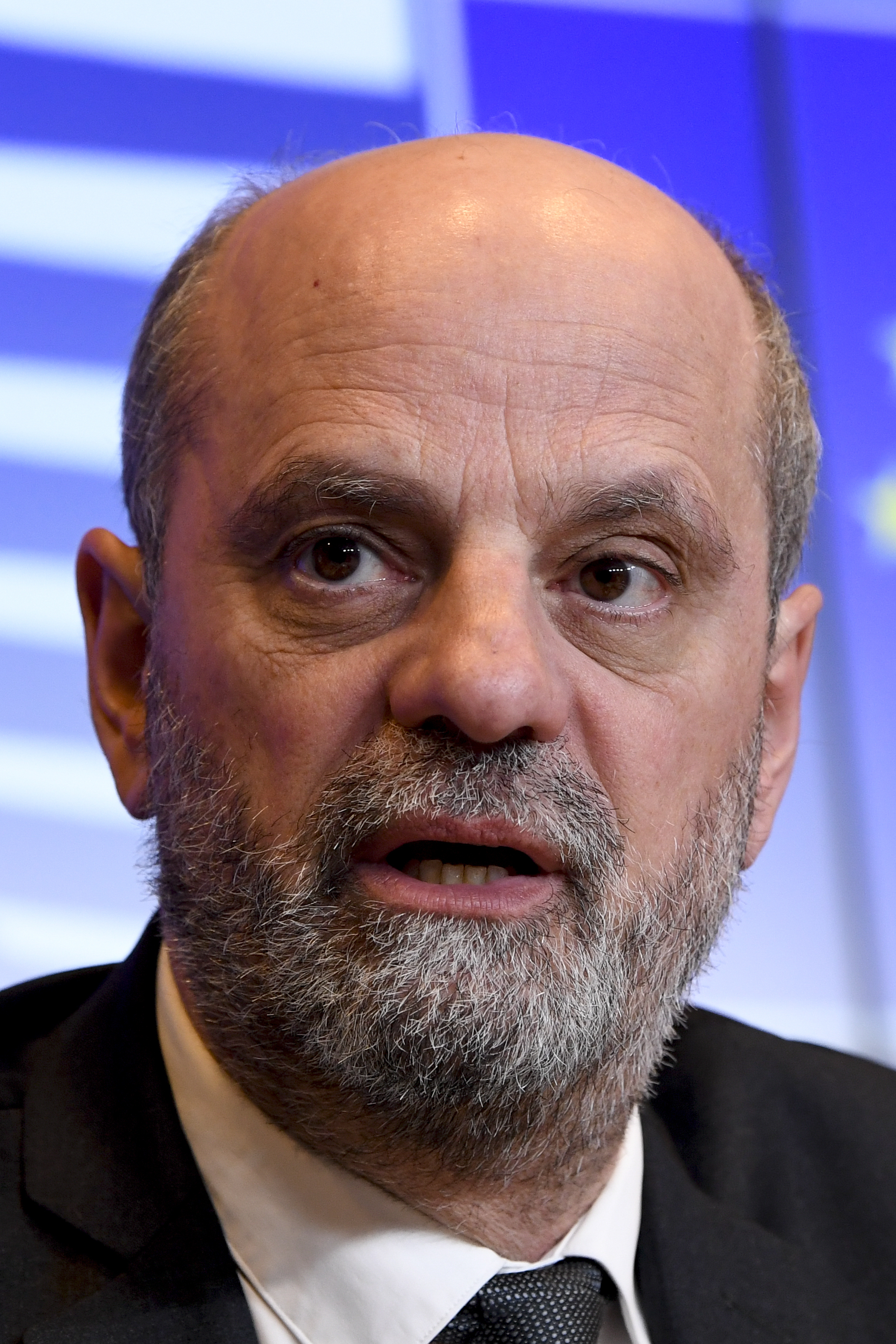
- Blanquer in 2022

Minister of National Education, Youth and Sports
- In office 17 May 2017 – 20 May 2022
- President: Emmanuel Macron
- Prime Minister: Édouard Philippe; Jean Castex
- Preceded by: Najat Vallaud-Belkacem (National Education, Higher Education and Research)
- Succeeded by: Pap Ndiaye

Personal details
- Born: 4 December 1964 (age 61) Paris, France
- Party: LREM (since 2017)
- Spouse(s): Anna Cabana (m. 2022) Sophie de Puybaudet (m. 1991; div. 2012) Aurélia Devos (m. 2018; div. 2020)
- Education: Collège Stanislas
- Alma mater: Paris 1 Panthéon-Sorbonne University; Sciences Po; Paris 2 Panthéon-Assas University

Jean-Michel Blanquer (French pronunciation: [ʒɑ̃ miʃɛl blɑ̃kɛʁ]; born 4 December 1964) is a French jurist and government official who served as Minister of National Education under Prime Ministers Édouard Philippe and Jean Castex from 2017 to 2022.

== Education and early career ==
Born in the 8th arrondissement of Paris, he obtained a doctorate in law from Panthéon-Assas University and a master's degree in politics from Sciences Po. From 1996 to 1998, he was a professor in civil law at Sciences Po Lille. From 1998 to 2004, he was director of the Institute of Latin American Studies at the New Sorbonne University.

From 2009 to 2012, Blanquer served as the director general of secondary and junior school education under then Minister of National Education Luc Chatel. In 2013, he became president of ESSEC Business School.

== Minister of National Education ==
On 15 May 2017, Blanquer was appointed by President Emmanuel Macron to be Minister of National Education in the first Philippe government. He retained the position on 17 June 2017 when the second Philippe government was formed, following the legislative election of 2017.

Soon after assuming the office, Blanquer announced plans to get rid of homework, preferring instead that time be set aside during the school day to do homework in school. He also overhauled the French baccalaureate and introduced free breakfasts for school children in poor neighborhoods. In June 2017, the ministry published a readjustment of elementary school programs in French and mathematics.

In December 2017, Blanquer announced that France's education system would ban mobile devices during lunch or recess. The announcement was met with mixed responses.

In October 2020, he faced the murder of Samuel Paty, a secondary school teacher, by an Islamic terrorist, in Éragny, Val-d'Oise.

In early 2021, Blanquer removed himself from the race to lead the LREM campaign in Île-de-France during that year's regional elections and to potentially succeed Valérie Pécresse as president of the Regional Council of Île-de-France.

In addition to his government role, Blanquer has been heading Le Laboratoire de la République since 2021; the organisation is a think tank tasked with countering wokeism. He joined the law faculty of Paris 2 Panthéon-Assas University in 2022 as professor of civil law.

== 2022 legislative election ==
In the 2022 French legislative election, he stood in Loiret's 4th constituency but came third, and was eliminated in the first round.

== Personal life ==
Blanquer has been divorced twice.

== Bibliography ==
- "Requiem pour Jean-Michel Blanquer", in Thiollet, Jean-Pierre (2022), Hallier en roue libre, Paris: Neva Editions, ISBN 978-2-35055-305-4
