= Marlène Schiappa =

French politician

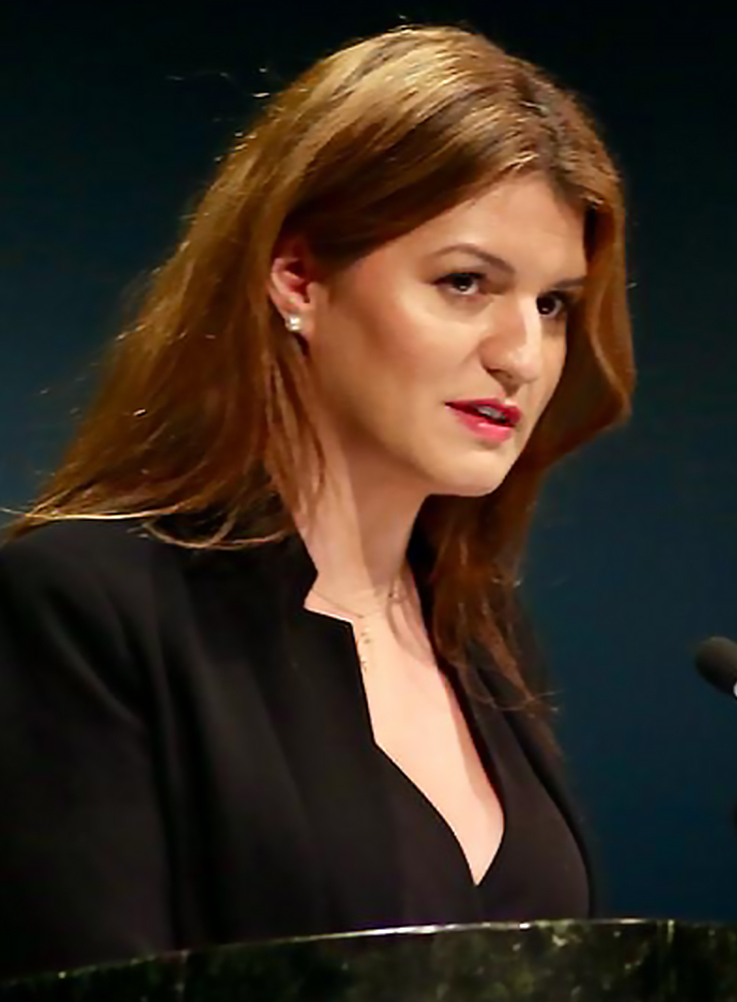
- Schiappa in 2019

State Secretary for the Social and Solidarity Economy and Associative Life
- In office 4 July 2022 – 20 July 2023
- President: Emmanuel Macron
- Prime Minister: Élisabeth Borne
- Preceded by: Olivia Grégoire (portfolio renamed)
- Succeeded by: Office abolished

Minister Delegate in charge of Citizenship
- In office 6 July 2020 – 20 May 2022
- President: Emmanuel Macron
- Prime Minister: Jean Castex
- Minister: Gérald Darmanin
- Preceded by: Office established
- Succeeded by: Sonia Backès

Secretary of State for Gender Equality
- In office 17 May 2017 – 6 July 2020
- President: Emmanuel Macron
- Prime Minister: Édouard Philippe
- Preceded by: Laurence Rossignol (portfolio renamed)
- Succeeded by: Elisabeth Moreno (portfolio renamed)

Personal details
- Born: 18 November 1982 (age 43) Paris, France
- Party: La République En Marche!
- Spouse: Cédric Brugière (m. 2006)
- Children: 2 daughters
- Education: University of Grenoble

Marlène Schiappa (French pronunciation: [maʁlɛn ʃjapa]; born 18 November 1982) is a French writer and politician who served as State Secretary for the Social and Solidarity Economy and Associative Life, attached to the Prime Minister, in the Borne government (2022–2023), as Minister Delegate in charge of Citizenship, attached to the Minister of the Interior, in the government of Prime Minister Jean Castex (2020–2022) and as Secretary of State for Gender Equality in the government of Prime Minister Édouard Philippe (2017–2020).

Ultimately, Schiappa was sacked from government in July 2023 as part of a cabinet reshuffle, a dismissal linked to the ongoing political scandal surrounding the "Marianne Fund" to combat Islamist extremism, a fund she set up as junior minister in 2021, and whose handling came under public and parliamentary scrutiny in 2023. The fund has faced criticism for its lack of transparency and the conditions under which grants were awarded. Accusations of favoritism and mismanagement arose, particularly regarding the allocation of funds to associations that were perceived to be close to the government like "Conspiracy Watch" founded by Rudy Reichstadt.

== Education ==
Schiappa attended Lycée Claude-Bernard in the 16th arrondissement of Paris, where she obtained her Baccalauréat ES. She studied Geography at the Sorbonne for a year. She took evening class in communications and earned a bachelor's degree validated by the University of Grenoble. On 24 January 2024 she announced on LinkedIn that she was joining Emlyon Business School as a student.

== Professional career ==
In 2007, Schiappa started working at the advertising company Euro RSCG, the same year she founded the online magazine "Les Pasionarias". In 2008 she set up a blog for working mothers called "Maman travaille" (Mummy works), following the blog success she set up a support network for working mothers to put together proposals for changes in politics. After the birth of her first daughter, she left advertising and began writing novels on the theme of motherhood and feminism, some of the most successful books were: Letters To My Uterus and Who Are The Rapists. She moved to Le Mans in northwestern France.

== Political career ==
In 2014 Schiappa was elected deputy mayor of the city of Le Mans, in charge of gender equality and discriminations, a position she held until 2017. In 2015 she met Emmanuel Macron, then minister of the economy, at a technology event, gifting him her book Plafond de mère, a few weeks later he asked her to participate in a conference about gender equality and politics.

In 2014 she co-founded the Movement of French Elected Officials for Equality (MEFE). From 2016 to 2017, Shiappa became delegate advisor to technological innovation and economic attractiveness of the territory. In 2016 she also served as an advisor to Laurence Rossignol (Minister of Families, Childhood and Woman's rights) in the government of Prime Minister Manuel Valls.

In 2016–17, Schiappa was delegate to the department of Sarthe in charge of gender equality for La République En Marche! as well as member of its national Investiture Committee.

=== Secretary of State for Gender Equality ===
In 2017, Schiappa became Secretary of State for Gender Equality attached to the Prime Minister.

In 2018, Schiappa successfully introduced a law to deter predatory remarks and street harassment, such as wolf-whistling. In 2018, she proposed a change to the French civil code to introduce a ban on corporal punishment; the bill called "anti-smacking bill" in the media was approved on 30 November 2018.

On the eve of International Women's Day in 2018, Schiappa appeared, alongside Roselyne Bachelot among others, in a performance of Eve Ensler's Vagina Monologues at the Bobino theater in Paris.

In 2019, amid revelations of the Jeffrey Epstein affair, Schiappa and fellow cabinet member child welfare minister, Adrien Taquet called for an investigation into the activities in France of the convicted sex offender Jeffrey Epstein "so that his death does not deny his victims the justice they are entitled to".

In November 2019, Schiappa proposed that foreigners convicted of sexual crimes and violence against women would be deported. This proposal was criticised by some feminists who called it "feminationalism" and unequal punishment based on nationality, and also by a legal expert who said that such measures already existed since 1970 for serious crimes including the worst sexual crimes.

=== Minister Delegate in charge of Citizenship ===
On 6 July 2020, Schiappa was appointed Minister Delegate in charge of Citizenship, attached to the Minister of the Interior, in the government of Prime Minister Jean Castex.

During the COVID-19 pandemic in France, in September 2020, Schiappa announced that foreign health workers would be fast-tracked to obtain French citizenship.

== Works ==
Schiappa has published more than 28 novels and essays under her name as well as under the pseudonym Marie Minelli.

- J’aime ma famille (2010)
- Osez l'amour des rondes (2010)
- Maman travaille, le guide (2011)
- Je reprends le travail après bébé (2012)
- Le Dictionnaire déjanté de la maternité (2013)
- Éloge de l’enfant roi (2013)
- Les 200 astuces de Maman travaille (2013)
- Le Guide de grossesse de Maman travaille (2014)
- Pas plus de 4 heures de sommeil (2014)
- Sexe, mensonges et banlieues chaudes (2014)
- J’arrête de m’épuiser, with Cédric Bruguière, (2015)
- La Seule Chose à briser, c'est le silence (2015)
- Plafond de mère, with Cédric Bruguière, (2016)
- Marianne est déchaînée (2016)
- Lettres à mon utérus (2016)
- Ensemble contre la gynophobie (2016)
- Femmes de candidats (2017)
- Où sont les violeurs ? Essai sur la culture du viol (2017)
- Les Lendemains avaient un goût de miel (2017)
- La Culture du viol (2018)
- Le Deuxième sexe de la démocratie (2018)
- Si souvent éloignée de vous : lettres à mes filles (2018)
- Une et indivisible : L'Urgence de défendre la République (2019)
- Entre toutes les femmes : Onze rencontres exceptionnelles (2020)
- Les Droits des femmes face aux violences (2020)
- Scandale (2024)

== Controversy ==
In early 2023, an investigation by two French news outlets accused the Fonds Marianne, an anti-radicalism fund Schiappa set up in 2021 to promote French Republican values and fight online extremism and that she supervised, of very lax oversight.

In April 2023, Schiappa caused controversy when she appeared on the cover of the Playboy magazine's French edition, wearing a low-cut white dress while the country is undergoing civil unrest.

== Personal life ==
Schiappa grew up in a multiracial council estate north of Paris, she is the daughter of Jean-Marc Schiappa, a historian of Corsican descent and Catherine Marchi, a Vice-principal in Dijon. Schiappa has two sisters. After a short marriage in 2001, she married Cédric Bruguière in 2006, they have two daughters together. She has a brown belt in judo.

== See also ==
- Castex government
