= Frédérique Vidal =

French biochemist and politician (born 1964)

Minister of Higher Education, Research and Innovation
- In office 17 May 2017 – 20 May 2022
- Prime Minister: Édouard Philippe; Jean Castex
- Preceded by: Najat Vallaud-Belkacem (National Education, Higher Education, and Research)
- Succeeded by: Sylvie Retailleau

Personal details
- Born: 9 May 1964 (age 62) Monaco
- Education: University of Nice Sophia Antipolis; Pasteur Institute

Frédérique Vidal (French: [fʁedeʁik vidal]; born 9 May 1964) is a Monegasque-born French-based biochemist, academic administrator, and politician who served as Minister of Higher Education, Research and Innovation in the government of Prime Ministers Édouard Philippe and Jean Castex from 2017 to 2022. She was the president of the University of Nice from 2012 to 2017.

== Early life ==
Vidal was born in Monaco. She was educated in Monaco and earned a master's degree in biochemistry from the University of Nice Sophia Antipolis. She earned a Master of Advanced Studies in molecular virology from the Pasteur Institute, and a PhD in biology from the University of Nice Sophia Antipolis.

== Career ==
Vidal began her career as a biochemist for Virbac.

Vidal joined her alma mater, the University of Nice, as an associate professor in 1995. She became a full professor in 2002, and she served as the chair of the biology department from 2005 to 2008. There is no evidence that Vidal officially directed a thesis; she published one scientific peer-reviewed paper as last author and has an h-index of 14 (retrieved on Web of Science, February 2021).

She was the vice dean of its college of sciences from 2007 to 2009, and its dean from 2009 to 2012. She succeeded Albert Marouani as the university president in 2012. During her first term, Vidal founded Université Côte d'Azur, a consortium consisting of the university, and local business schools and research centres, to increase the international attractiveness of the university. She was re-elected as president in 2016.

Vidal was opposed to the circulaire Guéant, a failed proposal by Interior Minister Claude Guéant whose aim was to curtail the ability of non-EU foreign students to stay in France after the completion of their studies. She suggested the University of Nice should not discriminate on the basis of national origin or financial resources.

On 17 May 2017, Vidal was appointed Minister of Higher Education, Research and Innovation in the First Philippe Government.

In March 2019, Vidal criticized the Polish Institute of National Remembrance for its role in the disruption of Holocaust conference in Paris.
