= Sophie Cluzel =

French politician (born 1961)

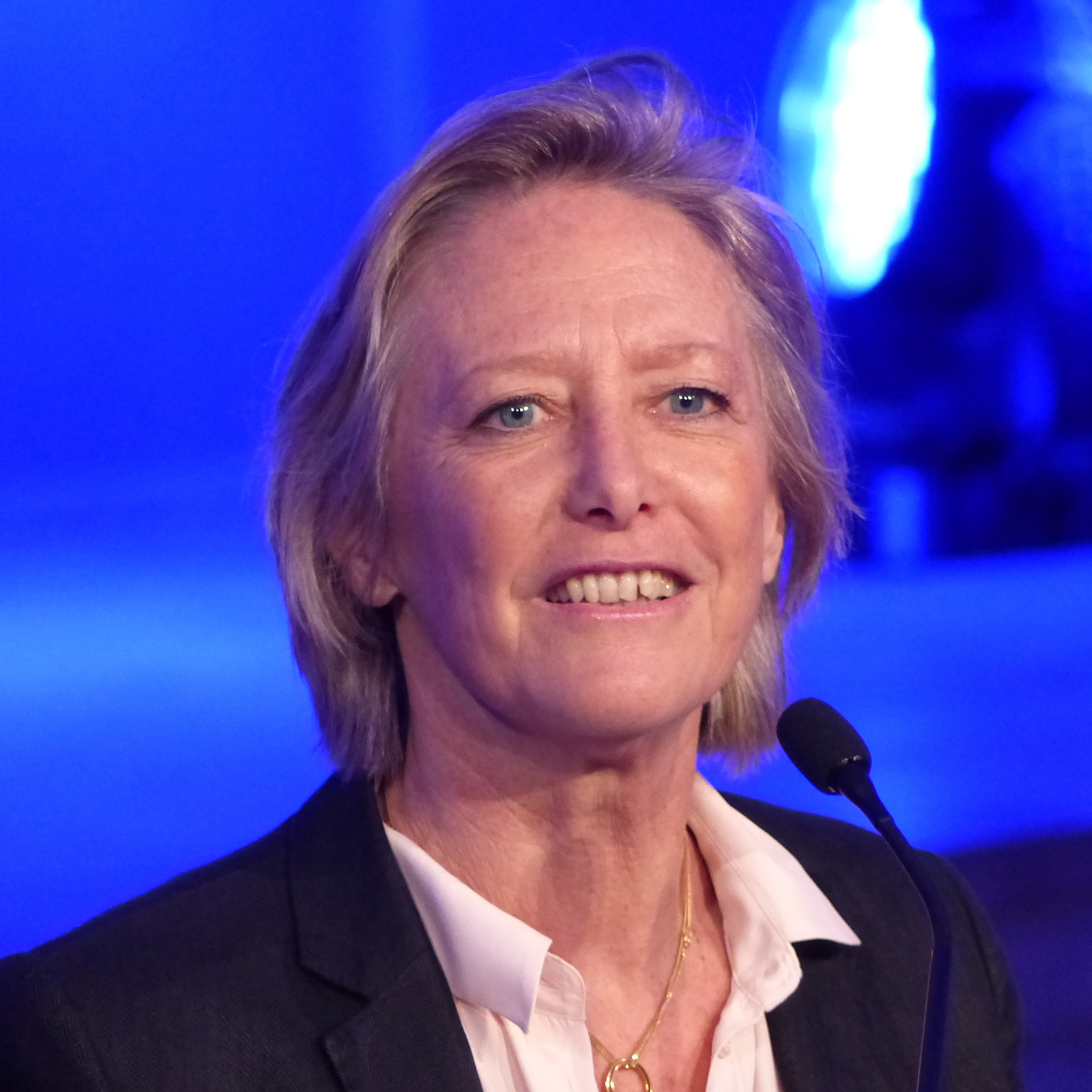
- Sophie Cluzel in 2018

Secretary of State in charge of Disabled People
- In office 17 May 2017 – 20 May 2022
- President: Emmanuel Macron
- Prime Minister: Édouard Philippe; Jean Castex
- Preceded by: Ségolène Neuville
- Succeeded by: Damien Abad

Personal details
- Born: Sophie Marchand; 7 January 1961 (age 65) Marseille, France
- Party: La République En Marche!
- Education: Euromed Marseille

Sophie Cluzel (French pronunciation: [sɔfi klyzɛl]; born 7 January 1961) is a French politician of La République En Marche! (LREM) who served as the Secretary of State in charge of People with Disabilities in the governments of successive Prime Ministers Édouard Philippe and Jean Castex from 2017 to 2022.

== Early career ==
Early in her career, Cluzel was the founder of various associations for the education of disabled children, including the SAIS 92 collective and the association Grandir à l'école (Growing up at school), an initiative dedicated to children with Down syndrome.

Cluzel served as president of the National Federation of Associations Serving Students with Disabilities and as administrator of the National Union of Associations of Parents to Mentally Handicapped Persons and their Friends (UNAPEI) from 2011 to 2013.

== Political career ==
For the 2021 regional elections, Cluzel was nominated as LREM's candidate to become President of the Regional Council of Provence-Alpes-Côte d'Azur. Following an agreement between LREM and the Republicans (LR), she later ran on same ticket led by LR's Renaud Muselier, the incumbent president of the Regional Council.

== Personal life ==
Cluzel is married to a nephew of Jean Cluzel.
