= French North Korean =

French North Korean or North Korean French may refer to:

- French people in North Korea
- North Koreans in France
- France–North Korea relations
- Multiracial people of French and North Korean descent
