= Gilles Babinet =

French multi-entrepreneur

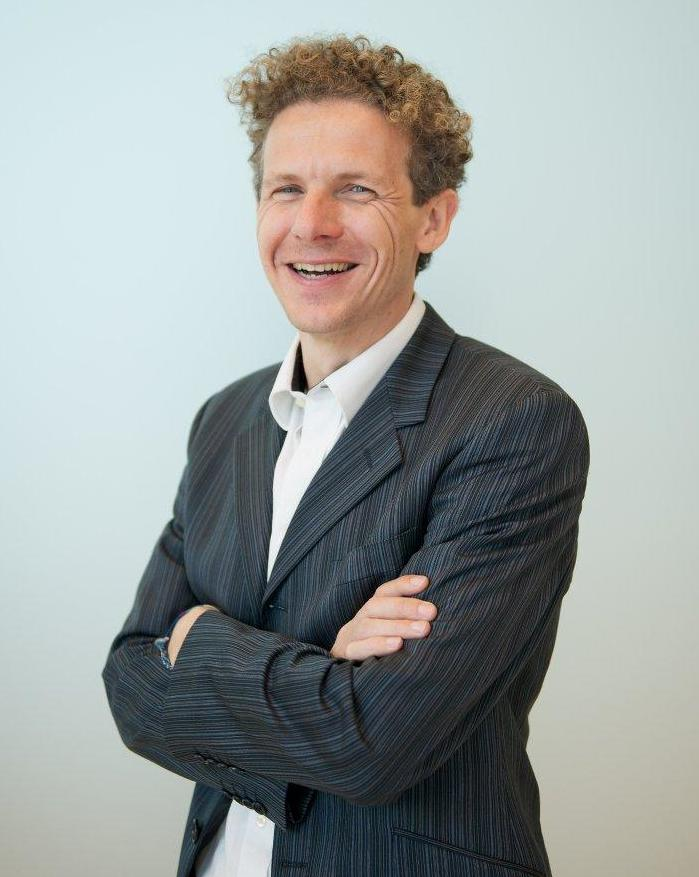
- Gilles Babinet in 2009
- Born: 1967 (age 58–59); Paris, France
- Occupations: Multi-entrepreneur, digital expert, author
- Known for: Co-president of the Conseil National du Numérique, French Digital Champion for the EU
- Website: laitao.fr

Gilles Babinet (born 1967) is a French multi-entrepreneur.

He represents France in the Digital Champions group built by the European Union.

He is also co-President of the Conseil National du Numérique, a body advising the French Government on digital matters.

== Biography ==
Born in Paris, Babinet dropped out from school at 15 and then graduated his French "Baccalauréat" at the age of 20 as a free candidate.

== Career ==
He has created nine companies since 1989 in various areas of activity:

Escalade Industrie: founded in 1989, his first company, specializes in work-at-height interoperations and had forty employees at the end of its first year.

Absolut Design created with Clément Bataille in 1991, focused on public transportation, including the design of the streetcar of Bordeaux, and the design of the garbage cans of the subway in Paris. In 2000, Babinet sold what had become BETC Design to Euro RSCG.

Musiwave: launched in 2000, as Musiwap, then renamed Musiwave. In 2002, it became the first company in the world to offer "hifi" ringtones . This very year, the company also offered downloads of CD-quality songs using GPRS technology, in a partnership with the English telecommunications company Vodafone. The company was finally sold to Openwave for US$139m in January 2006. In December 2007, Openwave sold it to Microsoft.

Captain Dash: a product for the automatic aggregation and synchronization of all kinds of business data. Its SaaS solution, mixing data visualization, design, and mobile devices, gives marketers a dashboard to visualize, evaluate, and correlate data flows from their own ERP and external data such as the weather, air quality, car traffic, vacation periods, holy days, Google trends, political elections, TV audience, and the like.

Eyeka is a free website with more than 200,000 consumers in 91 countries which offers a platform for creative contests. To date, it has launched more than 450 contests with €1,300,000 in prizes Its objective is to connect talent with leading brands to imagine new concepts, invent better products and co-create engaging content.

MXP4 develops interactive music solutions that create revenue opportunities for the music, media and marketing industries. It creates a video game-like environment where consumers can play with the music.

Digibonushas been helping brands build relationships with their fans since 2009 through social media experiences such as polls, prize draws, photo contests, quizzes, and more.

Nowadays, Babinet has stepped down from the management of his other firms to concentrate on his role as executive chairman of Captain Dash. Along with this position, he is also a non-executive director at LinkByNet, a cloud service company as well as member of the Strategic advisory board of EY France. From 2002 until 2010, Babinet was also at the board of administrators of the Mobile Entertainment Forum, an international Association promoting leisure services on mobiles. Mr. Babinet is also an active member of the association 100 000 entrepreneurs.

== French National Digital Council ==
He was the elected president of the French National Digital Council (Cnnum), from 2011 to 2012. The council is in charge of advising the government on digital economy and new technology. Under his presidency, it focused on Government reform programs to boost competitiveness. The Cnnum was especially committed to the development of e-education, innovation funding, and open data.

He was appointed French Digital Champion in 2012 by Fleur Pellerin, French minister of digital technologies, and works with Neelie Kroes, European Commissioner in charge of digital technologies. This function is the follow-up of his former position as president of the French National Digital Council (Cnnum),

In June 2018, Gilles Babinet was reappointed as a member of the French National Digital Council. On July 5, he was appointed vice-President, under the presidency of Salwa Toko.

In February 2021, he was appointed as co-president of the French National Digital Council with Mrs. Françoise Mercadal-Delasalles.

== Institut Montaigne ==
Babinet also participated in some of the Institut Montaigne's studies :

- June 2011 : "How to develop our small and medium size companies", a report giving concrete solutions to develop the French network of small companies inside and outside France.
- March 2013 : "For a digital New Deal", a report presenting 10 propositions to promote France as a major actor of the digital transition.
- April 2015 : "Big Data et Objects Connecté, faire de la France un champion digital " a report that focuses on the optimal regulation to ease the development of the digital economy .
- June 2017 : "Enseignement Supérieur, connectez-vous" a report stressing the need for Universities to reform themselves in order to remain competitive in the digital era.
- March 2018 : "Protection sociale : Une mise à jour vitale". A report on the social protection changes needed to guarantee more justice and adequacy for all citizens.
- May 2019 :" L'Europe et la 5G : Passons la cinquième! - 1ère Partie". Written by Achour Messas, Julien Huvé, Laurent Inard, and Davud Luponis, the report was supervised by Gilles Babinet.
- April 2020 " " Internet : Le péril jeune?". Report on how to form, guide, and empower youth with their web's use

== La Paillasse ==
Babinet has been a proactive supporter of La Paillasse an open-science laboratory dedicated to biological and Wetware research. While helping La Paillasse to secure its initial funding from the Mayor Office of Paris, Babinet also brought in the Swiss laboratory Hoffmann-La Roche to set up and launch in May 2015 the program "Epidemium" dedicated to the computation of Data in the Oncological field.

== Writing ==
Books

Babinet has published

– His first book in January 2014: "L'Ère numérique, un nouvel âge de l'humanité", ("The digital era, a new age of humanity") where he discusses the impact of new technologies on our societies, our lives, and our institutions. Throughout his book, he identifies five areas: Education, Healthcare, the State, Knowledge, and Production, that are deeply challenged in the context of the ongoing digital revolution.

– In March 2015 : "Big Data, penser l'homme et le monde autrement", a book that aims to explain what is the concept of big data and what type of usages it can deliver. The book also addresses the ethical issues of machine learning and automation.

– In December 2016 "Transformation Digitale, l'avènement des plateformes" a book to explain how companies should transform themselves in order to thrive in the digital era.

— In June 2019 " Transformation digital 2.0" (preface)

— In November 2020 : " Refondre les politiques publiques avec le numérique" Guide on how politicians and government could and should use digital tools in public politic.

Articles

- "L’Etat Islamique, enfant monstrueux des années Internet", Les Echos, 19 November 2015
- "Laissons les start-up faire concurrence à Pôle emploi" Les Echos, 3 November 2015
- "Redevance sur les smartphones : une mauvaise idée", Les Echos, 3 September 2015
- "Ne protégez plus vos innovations; partagez-les !", Les Echos, 03/08,2015
- "Réussir sa transformation digitale en quatre leçons", Les Echos, 22 June 2015
- "Colbert et les smartgrids", Les Echos, 3 March 2015
- "Trois raisons d'y croire", Les Echos, 20 January 2015
