= Van Uffelen =

van Uffelen is a surname. Notable people with the surname include:

- Chris van Uffelen (born 1966), Dutch-German author
- Denis van Uffelen (born 1971), Belgian tennis player
- Lucas van Uffelen (1586–1637), Dutch merchant
- Saskia Van Uffelen, Belgian businesswoman
