= Digital Champions =

The Digital Champions are appointed by each European Union Member State to help them and the European Commission promote the benefits of an inclusive digital society. The Digital Champions act locally. They work with citizens, communities, businesses, governments, and academia. They do so by helping individuals become digital, by promoting e-skills in education, fostering e-government services, encouraging entrepreneurship, supporting businesses to embrace new technologies and be more competitive, contributing to research and innovation. They also advise the European Commission on the implementation of the Digital Agenda for Europe. The European Commission regularly interact with the Digital Champions and this exchange provides a valuable platform to discuss, compare and expand action at grass-roots level. The Digital Champions meet at least twice a year.

== Background ==
In December 2011, the European Council stressed that the Digital Single Market was an area of growth potential for the European Union. Vice-President Neelie Kroes, the Commissioner for the Digital Agenda, then asked the European Commission to take up this challenge by appointing a national Digital Champion, who could help get every European digital. On 14 February 2012 the European Commission President José Manuel Barroso wrote to Member States and asked them to take further dedicated action to make the Digital Single Market a reality. One way to do this was to appoint a national Digital Champion. The first meeting of the Digital Champions and Vice-President Kroes was held in Brussels in June 2012. Further meetings were held in Sofia in September 2012 and in Brussels 2013. The Digital Champions convened for the fourth time in Dublin back-to-back with the Digital Agenda Assembly. The Champions fifth and sixth meetings were held in Brussels and their seventh meeting back-to-back to the Digital Action Day on 29 September 2014. The Digital Champions met with European Vice-President Andrus Ansip and European Commissioner Günther Oettinger in February 2015. Their ninth meeting took place back-to-back with the Digital Assembly in Riga in June 2015 and since then they met several times either in Brussels or at subsequent Digital Assemblies.

== Digital Champions by country ==
| Member State | Digital Champion |
|---|---|
| Austria | Ingrid Brodnig |
| Belgium | Saskia van Uffelen |
| Bulgaria | Gergana Passy |
| Cyprus | Stelios Himonas |
| Czech Republic | Ondrej Felix |
| Denmark | Niels Bjorn Andersen |
| Finland | Linda Liukas |
| France | Gilles Babinet |
| Germany | |
| Greece | Nikos Michalopoulos |
| Hungary | Jobbágy László |
| Italy | Diego Piacentini |
| Latvia | Reinis Zitmanis |
| Lithuania | Renata Danielene |
| Luxembourg | Romain Martin |
| Malta | Godfrey Vella |
| Netherlands | Tineke Netelenbos |
| Poland | Wlodzimierz Marcinski |
| Portugal | Domingos Folque Guimaraes |
| Romania | Paul Andre Baran |
| Slovakia | Peter Pellegrini |
| Slovenia | Marko Grobelnik |
| Spain | José Angel Alonso Jimenez |
| Sweden | Jan Gulliksen |
