= French South Korean =

French South Korean or South Korean French may refer to:

- French people in South Korea
- South Koreans in France
- France–South Korea relations
- Multiracial people of French and South Korean descent
