= Startup Europe Summit =

The Startup Europe Summit (SES) is a pop-up conference that brings together entrepreneurs, investors, academics, policy makers and major corporates. It showcases new EU-funded initiatives designed to boost Europe's tech and web startups. The first SES was held in Berlin in 2015.

== Startup Europe Summit 2015 ==
The Startup Europe Summit 2015 was a two-day technology summit hosted at Factory Berlin on February 12 & 13 that was put together in cooperation with the European Commission, Factory and the Startup Europe Initiative. There were talks from Europe's key startup players, a startup fair showcasing the newest technology products developed in Europe as well as a closed top-floor, available for private meetings between founders, industry representatives and policy makers. The invite-only event attracted 1200 attendees.

Speakers included European Commissioners Günther H. Oettinger and Andrus Ansip, Israeli VC Yossi Vardi, and Marie Ekeland of France Digitale. The closing speech was given by the Ex-Vice President of the European Commission and current Special Envoy for Startups, Neelie Kroes.

Prezi founder Adam Somlai-Fischer demonstrated his new presentation app Nutshell live on stage. Ijad Madisch from Research Gate also debuted a new product - the RG Format, an interactive alternative to pdf. John Emerson, US ambassador to Germany, spoke about data protection and failure in a talk that was picked up on by the Wall Street Journal. While Angel List's Philipp Moehring publicly launched UK syndicates, which allow individuals to invest alongside accredited investors.

The entire summit was live streamed and videos of the event have been made publicly available along with photos and the schedule.

== Startup Europe Summit 2016 ==
Speakers included ROBYN SCOTT Co-founder & CEO, Apolitical, Christophe Maire Founding Partner & CEO, Atlantic Labs Travis Kalanick CEO, Uber, Günther H. Oettinger Commissioner, Digital Economy & Society, Pawel Chudzinski Managing Partner, Point Nine Capital, Katja Bergman Partner, MOOR Capital, Florian Meissner Co-founder & CEO, EyeEm, Carlos Moedas Commissioner, Research, Science and Innovation, Jamie Shea Emerging Security Threats, NATO, Neelie Kroes Special Envoy, StartupDelta, Kaidi Ruusalepp Founder & CEO, Funderbeam, Jeff Lynn Co-founder & CEO, Seedrs, and many more.

== Startup Europe Summit 2018 ==
Sofia hosted the fourth edition of Startup Europe Summit. The policy conference is focused on early stage pioneers and is led by the European Commission.

Organised in Sofia on 15 November 2018, the event was focused on technology leadership, European tech ecosystem funding and on solutions to strengthen the startup environment in Central and Eastern Europe and Western Balkans.

Four Prime Ministers and Commissioner Gabriel plus 700 stakeholders from the continent's buoyant startup ecosystem, including investors and entrepreneurs, gather in the Bulgarian capital to generate initiatives that can support the next generation of pioneers achieve success in Europe, and beyond.

== Startup Europe Summit 2019 ==
Known as an evolving tech hub in Romania, the city of Cluj-Napoca will host the fourth edition of Startup Europe Summit in 2019.

The Romanian Presidency of the Council of the European Union has decided to organise the Startup Europe Summit as an EU Presidency event on 21–22 March 2019 in Cluj-Napoca, Romania.

The three objectives of the Summit were: to reinforce CEE ecosystems and framework conditions while creating closer links with Western European startup ecosystems; to showcase Cluj and Romania as a startups hub; and to present the state of play and progress made by the EU networks created at the Startup Summit in Sofia.

Featured guests include: Commissioner Mariya Gabriel, Kat Borlongan - Director, La French Tech, Martin Villig - Co-founder, Bolt, Marius Ghenea - Investment Director at 3TS Capital Partners, Miguel Arias - Global Entrepreneurship Director, Telefónica, Alberto Onetti - chairman, Mind The Bridge Foundation or Robin Wauters - Founder, Tech.eu.
