= Mass surveillance in France =

Mass surveillance in France has existed over centuries.

== History ==
As part of the 2010s global surveillance disclosures, Le Monde found that the DGSE intercepted signals on the French public.

Following the Charlie Hebdo shooting, France passed the Intelligence Act.

Following the November 2015 Paris attacks, France again expanded surveillance powers.

France's practices gained increased scrutiny around the 2024 Summer Olympics including over the effectiveness of such practices. The usage at the olympics made France the first EU country to legalize Al video surveillance which Amnesty International described as undermining EU efforts to regulate AI including through the AI Act. Concerns were also raised that the Olympics were being used as a pretext to get the foot-in-the-door.

== See also ==
- Frenchelon
- Global surveillance § France
