= Conseil national du numérique =

French independent advisory commission

- CNNum's logo since 2017
- Abbreviation: CNNum
- Type: independent advisory commission
- Headquarters: 6 rue Louise Weiss, 75013 Paris
- Official language: French
- Website: cnnumerique.fr

The Conseil national du numérique (French Digital Council, abbreviated CNNum or less commonly CNN) is a French independent advisory commission created on 29 April 2011 by the French presidential decree n°2011-476. It was reorganized and expanded by another French presidential decree on 13 December 2012, to expand its spectrum of actions to all the questions set up by the development of the digital in society and economy.

The council issues independent opinions and recommendations on any question relating to the impact of digital technologies on economy and society. The government can consult the council on new legislation or draft regulations.

== History ==
In October 2014, the CNNum got responsible for organising a national consultation on the French digital strategy ("Digital Ambition" or Ambition numérique) which would lead to the drafting of the law for a digital republic. On June 18, 2015, the Ambition Numérique report was handed over to the French Prime Minister Manuel Valls by the president of the Conseil national du numérique, Benoit Thieulin, in presence of Ministers and Secretaries Emmanuel Macron, Marisol Touraine, Clotilde Valter and Axelle Lemaire. During the ceremony, Manuel Valls announced the digital strategy of the French government.

On February 10, 2016, Mounir Mahjoubi was appointed president of the council by former president of the French Republic François Hollande. Mahjoubi launched a project on the digital transformation of SMEs, the digitisation of universities and digital inclusion. In January 2017, he resigned from the CNNum to join Emmanuel Macron's presidential campaign as Digital Leader. He was then appointed Secretary of State for Digital Affairs on May 17, 2017. Following his resignation, the presidency of the council is assumed in a collegial manner by three vice-presidents : Guy Mamou-Mani, Sophie Pène and Amal Taleb.

In December 2017, the government repealed the decree of December 13, 2012 and replaced it with a new decree, appointing thirty new members. The Government appointed Marie Ekeland, co-founder of the Daphni investment fund, as president. On 19 December 2017, President Marie Ekeland and 28 of the 29 other members resigned following a controversy arising from the request for the ouster of Rokhaya Diallo, who had been appointed a few days earlier. This episode raises the question of the council's independence from the French government, with Marie Ekeland deploring in her letter of resignation that "the current form of appointment and functioning of the council is confusing and cannot guarantee its independence". The controversy attracted public attention and was related by The New York Times under the title "France Fails to Face Up to Racism".

After several months of vacancies, a new term of office was appointed on 29 May 2018, with Salwa Toko as president. In 2019, the French newspaper Acteurs publics writes that "a year after its formation, the Conseil national du numérique starts at last to play its part as switchman and, sometimes, as contradictor to the Government".

Following the text of Law No. 2018-699 of August 3, 2018 aimed at guaranteeing the presence of members of parliaments in certain bodies outside Parliament and simplifying the procedures for their appointment, the CNNum must include among its members two deputies and two senators appointed by the presidents of the two parliamentary chambers, the National Assembly and the Senate.

Since 2018, the CNNum has published several reports on digital accessibility, platform workers, digitisation of the health system, digital identity, or the environmental impact of digital technologies.

== Citizens consultations ==
The council can be mandated by the French government to organize citizens consultations over different topics, usually regarding issues related to digital regulation. These consultations are open to all and can be organized online as well as during "contributive events", where participants are invited to collectively reflect on one topic.

=== The General Estates on new digital regulations ===
In July 2018, the French secretary of state for digital affairs and former president of the CNNum, Mounir Mahjoubi, tasked the French Digital Council with the organisation of a large citizens consultation on new digital regulations, entitled "General Estates on new digital regulations" (états généraux des nouvelles régulations du numérique), under the patronage of French prime minister Edouard Philippe.

==== First phase ====
From July 2018 to January 2019, working groups including CNNum members, experts and administrations worked on public regulations scenarios divided in four topics:

- Economic regulation: the working group drafted scenarios for new competition regulation for the digital sector, especially in order to limit tech giants' market power, protect consumers and let smaller companies thrive on concentrated digital markets;
- Social regulation: the working group explored questions related to platform workers' social protection and the collaborative economy.
- Societal regulation: the working group made propositions regarding online freedom of expression, fight against illicit or heinous content or personal data protection.
- Regulation toolbox: the working group reflected on the new rules and authorities needed to regulate tech actors at French or European level (such as the General Data Protection regulation, the Platform to Business regulation or the Digital Services act). It suggested for instance the creation of a Platform Observatory.

The results of the first phase of work was handed over to Mounir Mahjoubi on February 14, 2019, by the president of CNNum, Salwa Toko.

==== Second phase ====
The second phase invited a wider audience made of civil society, platforms, various organisations or think tanks, experts, and academics to react on the different scenarios and recommendations that emerged from the first phase of the General Estates. It invited everyone to contribute to the reflection on new tech regulation via an online consultation platform, using civic tech and participatory democracy tools. The consultation also included thematic workshops organised between January and May 2019.

Participants were invited to contribute on 6 topics :

1. citizens protection against online illicit or heinous content while preserving freedom of expression;
2. competition rules in the face of "Big Tech"
3. public regulatory toolbox
4. platform workers' social protection
5. public interest data sharing
6. screen overexposure, particularly among younglings.

The advisory commission claims to have received more than 900 contributions for around 800 participants.

==== Results ====
The citizens consultation resulted in the publication of a synthesis of contributions on May 12, 2020.

=== Digital ambition ===
On September 4, 2014, French Prime Minister Manuel Valls asked the French Digital Council to handle a national consultation on digital technology. The national concertation aimed at experimenting an unprecedented manner of public policies construction, using participatory democracy tools. The consultation took place under the patronage of Axelle Lemaire, Secretary of State for Digital Affairs, and Thierry Mandon, Secretary of State for State Reform and Simplification.

For five months (October 2014-February 2015), the CNNum led a broad consultation on France's "digital ambition", in order to gather proposals and courses of action to make digital technologies an asset, both from an economic and societal point of view. The CNNum decided to structure this consultation around twenty-six consultations divided into four themes: "Growth, innovation, disruption"; "Loyalty in the digital environment"; "The digital transformation of public action"; "The digital metamorphosis of society".

The online consultation platform, designed with the civic tech organisation OpenDemocracy allowed every citizen, public or private organisation to contribute to the proposed themes. At the end of the consultation phases, the CNNum published summaries open to comments for each consultation, retracing the major controversies that emerged and the proposed courses of action.

Events were also organised outside of Paris on each of the themes, respectively in Lille, Strasbourg, Bordeaux and Nantes, in the presence of local stakeholders. The independent advisory body claims it has received 17 678 contributions from around 5 000 participants.

The national concertation resulted in the Ambition Numérique (Digital Ambition) report. The report was handed over on June 18, 2015, by the president of the CNNum, Benoit Thieulin, to the French Prime Minister, Manuel Valls, who publicly announced his government's digital strategy.

== Organization ==
The council's thirty members come from across the digital spectrum, and include researchers and activists. The council organises public consultations at both local and national level, and is in constant contact with France's digital ecosystem, including elected officials, members of civil society, researchers, digital experts, entrepreneurs and professional organisations.

=== Composition 2018-2020 ===
The French Digital Council is composed of 30 members appointed by a decree issued by the Prime Minister of the French Republic dated May 30th, 2018.

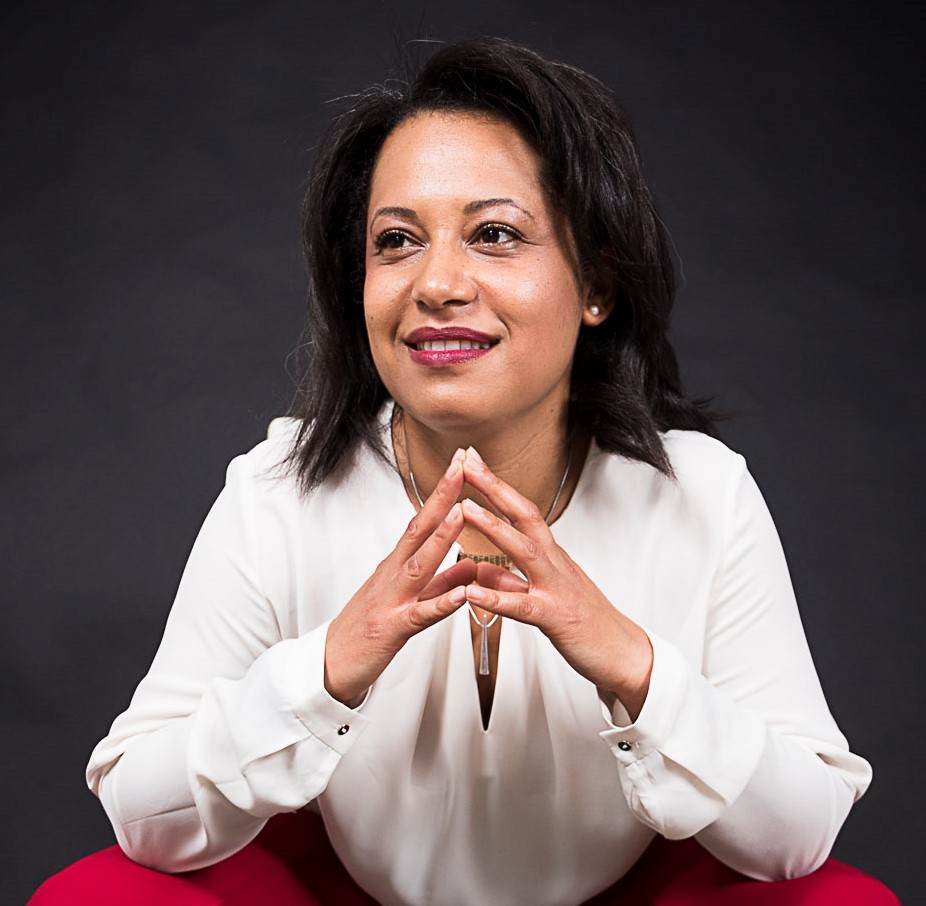
Salwa Toko, president of the French Digital Council since 2018

During the 2018-2020 mandate, members of the CNNum took positions in the public debate, sometimes in opposition to the French government. They were opposed to the Law of Mobility Orientation (Loi d'orientation des mobilités)'s dispositions concerning platform workers, as noted by media L'Usine Digitale, which titled "The President of the CNNum persists and signs: she doesn't want the platforms social responsibility charters for platform workers". The controversial dispositions were later partly censored by the French Constitutional Council. Members called for the implementation of social dialogue between platforms and workers as well as that of a "Digiscore", a rating system for platforms based on social criteria such as working conditions or workers' revenues. In an op-ed in Le Monde, Salwa Toko declared herself against a third status, specifically designed for platform workers in a grey zone between employment and self-employment : "Do we want to create a three-speed company, made up of employees, self-employed workers and workers with hybrid status, the conditions of which are then decided by judges on a case-by-case basis, leading de facto to the creation of a new precariat?", she asked.

They also took position against the law on online hate speech proposed by La République en Marche deputy, Laetitia Avia, along with several other fundamental rights organisations and think tanks such as La Quadrature du Net or the Human Rights League. Members of the CNNum said they were "worried on the impact this law could have on freedoms", according to French magazine Libération. The "Cyberhaine" law proposal was challenged before the Constitutional Council in May 2020, which declared large parts of the text were unconstitutional.

Members of the CNNum also acted in favor of digital accessibility for persons with disabilities. It first published an opinion asking the French government to "intensify its efforts in terms of digital accessibility", following the publication of a decree related to the accessibility of online communication services to people with disabilities. According to the advisory body, the initial decree project allowed for many possibilities for organisations to escape their obligations regarding digital accessibility. The French Digital Council called instead for more public resources allocated to the digital accessibility of online public services. In a February 2020 report entitled "Digital accessibility, between necessity and opportunity", Member of the CNNum Jérémie Boroy handed over the council's conclusions to Secretary of State for Digital affairs Cédric O and Secretary of State for People with Disabilities, Sophie Cluzel.

=== Current and former members ===
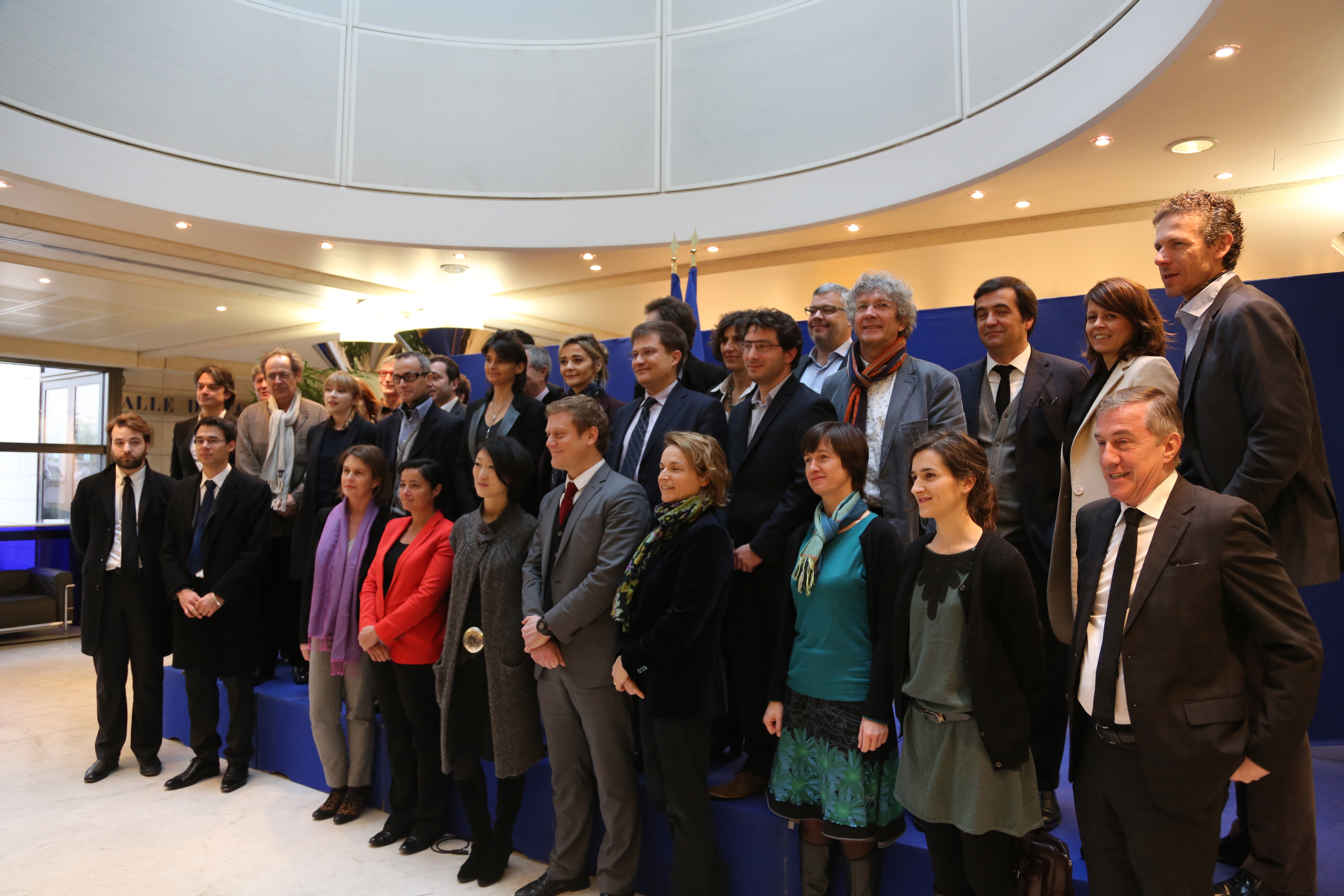

- Salwa Toko
- Gilles Babinet
- Nathalie Collin
- Gaël Duval
- Yann Algan
- Gilles Babinet
- Salwa Toko
- Constance Le Grip
- Jean-Michel Mis
- Mounir Mahjoubi
- Guy Mamou-Mani
- fr:Benoît Thieulin
- Roxanne Varza
- Tariq Krim
- Serge Abiteboul
- Tristan Nitot
- Bernard Stiegler
- Brigitte Vallée
- Jean-Baptiste Soufron

== List of publications ==
=== 2020 ===
- Boosting cultural diversity with Tech - September 2020
- Environment and Digital transformation roadmap. 50 measures for a European and national agenda on sustainable tech, meaning sober technologies and at the service of the ecological and solidary transition and of the sustainable development goals - July 2020 - Roadmap
- Competition and regulation. Case study on social networks interoperability - July 2020 - Case Study
- Working in the platform era. Upgrade required - July 2020 - Report
- Digital identities. Keystone to digital citizenship - June 2020 - Report
- Trust, innovation, solidarity. For a French vision of digital technologies in health - June 2020 - Report
- General Estates of the new digital regulations : syntheses of citizen consultations - May 2020 - Syntheses
- STOP COVID APP : Opinion of the council on the French contact tracing app in the context of COVID-19 - Avril 2020 - Opinion
- Digital accessibility, between necessity and opportunity - February 2020

=== 2019 ===
- State transformation : beyond the norm, think design - November 2019 - Opinion
- CNNum x SISTA Charter for the acceleration of women entrepreneurs financing - October 2019
- "We demand that the abandon of platform social responsibility charters" - September 2019 - Open letter
- The CNNum calls the French government to intensify its efforts on digital accessibility - May 2019 - Opinion
- Avia Law on illicit and hainous content : position of the council - March 2019 - Position

==== Other works ====
http://www.cnnumerique.fr/avis/

- Franco-German CryptoParty organized in Berlin on December 13, 2016 with the Beirat "Junge Digitale Wirtschaft" (BJDW), iRights.Lab and the French Digital Council.
- Second edition of the Franco-German Conference on digital issues that was held in Berlin on 13 December 2016. The BJDW and the French Digital Council called Germany and France to encompass the effects of the Digital Revolution on the society and the economy.
- Report of the council on the "fichier des titres électroniques sécurisés (TES)": public consultation online platform and link to the report.
- Report of the council on the digital transformation of SMEs: "Croissance connectée - Les PME contre-attaquent". The roadmap, diagnosis and the existing mechanisms benchmark by July, 2016.
- Report of the council on "l’Université numérique : du temps des explorateurs à la transformation" and the higher education system digital transformation framework. Issued on May 24, 2016, and on December 14, 2016, to Mr Thierry Mandon, Minister of State for Higher Education and Research, attached to the Minister of National Education, Higher Education and Research.
- Report of the council on "Travail emploi numérique : les nouvelles trajectoires". The council issued its report about the "Labor, employment and digital technologies" to Mrs Myriam El Khomri, Minister of Labour, Employment, Vocational Training and Social Dialogue, on January 6, 2016.
- Report of the council about the French Digital Bill The council was officially consulted by the Government on October 6, 2015, on the French digital draft bill ("projet de loi pour une "République numérique").
- Report of the council entitled "Pour une convergence des transitions écologique et numérique". On November 25, 2016, the Transition² programme partners and the council called for the convergence of both ecological and digital transitions.
- Franco-German Action Plan "Agir pour l’Innovation" (API). On October 27, 2015, the council and its German counterpart the BJDW, issued the joint action plan "Acting for Innovation" to Sigmar Gabriel, German Minister for Economic Affairs and Energy, and Emmanuel Macron, French Minister of the Economy and Finance, at the first Franco-German Conference on digital issues, chaired by the president of France, François Hollande, and the chancellor of Germany, Angela Merkel.
- Report No. 2015-2 on "La santé, bien commun de la société numérique" The council issued its report on "Health, a common good in a digital society" to Marisol Touraine, Minister of Social Affairs and Health on October 13, 2015. The report presents 15 proposals to enhance the French health innovation ecosystem and build a wide care-givers/patients network.
- Report "Ambition Numérique" (in French) handed over to Prime Minister Manuel Valls on 18 June 2015. 70 recommendations from the CNNum divided in 4 themes for a French and European policy on digital transition.
- Report No. 2014-4 dated 3 October 2014 "Jules Ferry 3.0": Building a fair and creative school system in a digital world 40 recommendations from the CNNum divided in 8 axes to build a creative and fair school in a digital world.
- Report No. 2014-2 dated 15 June 2014 on platform neutrality Recommendations from the CNNum for the platforms to stay at the service of innovation and respect freedoms.
- Report No. 2014-1 dated 20 March 2014 on the digital section of the Transatlantic Trade and Investment Partnership Recommendations from the CNNum to invite the EU to reinforce their negotiation possibilities and their strategy on the digital section of the Transatlantic Trade and Investment Partnership.
- Report No. 2013-3 dated 26 November 2013 on digital inclusion Recommendations from the CNNum to guarantee a large access to the digital.
- Report No. 2013-2 dated 10 September 2013 on the taxation of the digital economy Recommendations from the CNNum for a European fiscal strategy concerning the digital.
- Report No. 2013-1 dated 1 March 2013 on net neutrality Recommendations from the CNNum to make of net neutrality a fundamental principle.

==== Opinions by former member compositions ====
- Opinion No. 2014-3 dated 15 July 2014 on Article 9 of the bill on scaling up counter-terrorism provisions According to the CNNum, the targeted article is inefficient and reduce liberties; as such, alternatives are proposed in the opinion.
- Opinion No. 2014-2 dated 15 June 2014 on platform neutrality According to the CNNum, the platforms should stay at the service of innovation and respect freedoms.
- Opinion No. 2014-1 dated 20 March 2014 on the digital section of the Transatlantic Trade and Investment Partnership According to the CNNum, the EU should reinforce their negotiation possibilities and their strategy on the digital section of the Transatlantic Trade and Investment Partnership.
- Opinion No. 2013-6 dated 17 December 2013 on illicit contents and behaviors According to the CNNum, alternatives should be proposed to the measures proposed by politics to fight against cyberbullying and other illicit behaviours.
- Opinion No. 2013-5 dated 6 December 2013 on digital freedoms According to the CNNum, a large concertation on freedoms and rights in the digital era should be organized before modifying counter-terrorism bills and laws.
- Opinion No. 2013-4 dated 22 November 2013 on the law strengthening the fight against the system of prostitution (in French) According to the CNNum, the first article of said law is violating the freedom of expression.
- Opinion No. 2013-3 dated 10 September 2013 on the taxation of the digital economy According to the CNNum, the fiscal regulation of the digital should be done at the European level.
- Opinion No. 2013-2 dated 18 June 2013 on the teaching of computer science (in French) According to the CNNum, computer science should be generalized in French schools.
- Opinion No. 2013-1 dated 1 March 2013 on net neutrality According to the CNNum, net neutrality is a fundamental principle.
- Opinion dated 5 June 2012 on open data
- Opinion dated 4 April 2012 on the proposed banning of regular consultation of terrorist sites
- Opinion dated 6 March 2012 on digital media in schools
- Opinion dated 2 March 2012 on draft decrees and orders relating to the provision of information to central government and local authorities on infrastructure and networks established in their communities
- Opinion dated 14 February 2012 on thoughts about the taxation of the digital economy
- Opinion dated 25 November 2011 on the financing of innovation
- Opinion dated 21 November 2011 on the regulatory section of the transposition of the revised French Telecoms Package
- Opinion dated 30 June 2011 on the bill strengthening consumers’ rights, protection and information
- Opinion dated 17 June 2011 on the draft Decree implementing Article 18 of the Law on Trust in the Digital Economy
- Opinion dated 10 June 2011 relative to the taxation of online advertising
- Opinion dated 6 June 2011 on recommendations on the status of Young Innovative Company
- Opinion dated 23 May 2011 on the draft Order concerning electronic communications
