= Koreans in France =

Koreans in France 재프랑스 한인 Les Coréens en France
- (South Korea) (France)

Total population
- 40,000-45,000

Regions with significant populations
- Paris, Nice, Villeurbanne, Grenoble, Strasbourg, Toulouse, Amiens, Lyon, Marseille, Lille, Nantes, Rouen, Cannes, Montpellier, Bordeaux, Dijon, Strasbourg, Reims, Metz

Languages
- Korean, French

Religion
- Christianity and Mahayana Buddhism

Related ethnic groups
- Korean diaspora, Koryo-Saram

Koreans in France numbered 29,367 individuals as of 2014, making them the 3rd-largest Korean diaspora community in Western Europe, according to South Korea's Ministry of Foreign Affairs and Trade.

== Migration history ==
Korean migration to France began in 1919, when the government of France issued work permits to 35 Korean migrant labourers. From a community of just 3,310 in 1988, their numbers more than tripled by 2000, and then grew a further 30% by 2007. However, from 2009 to 2011, their population shrank by 14%. The vast majority live in Paris — about two-thirds, according to 2011 data, compared with four-fifths a decade before — with the largest concentrations in the 15th arrondissement. There are more than twice as many women as men; the population has grown more gender-imbalanced as compared to a decade prior. Unlike in the United States or Canada, with their large Korean American and Korean Canadian communities, few Koreans in France seek to naturalise as French citizens. Among all South Korean nationals or former nationals in France, 786 (6%) have become French citizens, 2,268 (18%) are permanent residents, 6,325 (50%) are international students, and the remaining 3,305 (26%) hold other kinds of visas.

Aside from South Korean expatriates, children adopted from Korea into French families form another portion of France's Korean population; most were adopted at between ages three and nine. The number of North Korean refugees has also been on the rise.

== Education ==
Koreans in France are served by five Korean-language weekend schools, the oldest and largest of which is the Paris Hangul School, established 18 August 1974; it enrolled 170 students as of 2007. Four others, in Villeurbanne, Grenoble, Strasbourg, and Toulouse, were established between 1994 and 2000; they enrolled a further 78 students. A significant number also attend French universities; in total, about half of the Korean population in France are estimated to be students, falling from two-thirds a decade ago.

== Inter-ethnic relations ==
Not many French people know that their country has a Korean community at all. In many cases, Koreans are mistaken for Chinese and thus lumped in as economic refugees.

As of 2001, only about 200 of the South Koreans in France were members of internationally married couples consisting of a South Korean partner and a French partner. Such couples experienced a number of cultural conflicts, most commonly over the rigour of their children's education.

Portrayals in popular culture of Koreans in France include the 2004 South Korean television series Lovers in Paris; its popularity has resulted in an increase in the number of Korean tourists visiting France. A more recent one is Hong Sang-soo's 2008 film Night and Day.

== Notable people ==
- Myung-whun Chung, Seoul-born Korean American, director of the Orchestre Philharmonique de Radio France
- Jean-Baptiste Kim, former unofficial North Korean spokesman
- Fleur Pellerin, Ministry of Culture
- Jean-Vincent Placé, French politician
- Daul Kim, Korean model
- Cédric O, French politician
- Delphine O, French politician
- Pom Klementieff, actress
- Ysabelle Lacamp, French novelist, singer and actress
- Euny Hong, author and journalist
- Elisa Shua Dusapin, Franco-Korean writer
- Soun-Gui Kim, South Korean multimedia artist

== See also ==
- French people in Korea
