= Portrait of Andrea Odoni =

Painting by Lorenzo Lotto

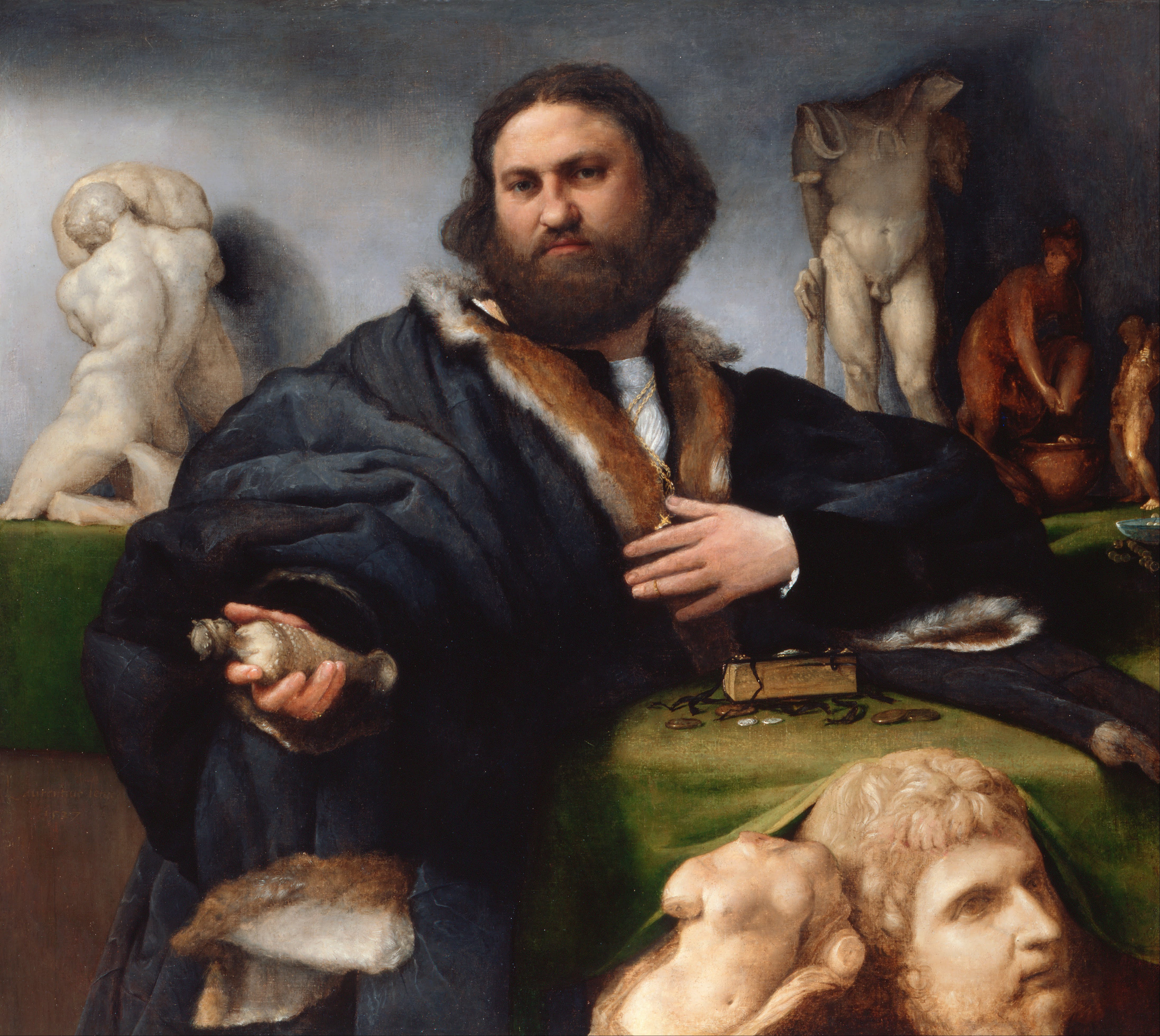
- Artist: Lorenzo Lotto
- Year: 1527
- Medium: Oil on canvas
- Dimensions: 104 cm × 116.6 cm (41 in × 45.9 in)
- Location: Buckingham Palace; London
- Owner: Royal Collection
- Accession: RCIN 405776

The Portrait of Andrea Odoni is an oil painting on canvas by Italian Renaissance artist Lorenzo Lotto, dated 1527. It is now in the Royal Collection of the United Kingdom and hangs in the Picture Gallery in Buckingham Palace, London. The style is typical of Lotto's Venetian period with denser tones, a softer chromatic range and atmospheric effects at the boundaries. The painting is signed and dated by Lotto.

== Sitter ==
Andrea Odoni (1488–1545) was a successful merchant in Venice, the son of an immigrant to the city from Milan. He was therefore a member, though much wealthier than most, of the ordinary cittadini rather than the patrician class who appear in most Venetian portraits. Odoni inherited a collection of art and antiquities from his uncle and considerably expanded it. His house, which Pietro Aretino implied was somewhat ostentatious, was described by Giorgio Vasari as "a friendly haven for men of talent".

There has been considerable debate about the meaning Lotto, presumably together with his sitter, intended to convey with the choice of objects. The portrait was displayed in Odoni's bedroom, alongside paintings by Titian and Palma Vecchio and a reclining nude by Girolamo Savoldo.

== Painting ==
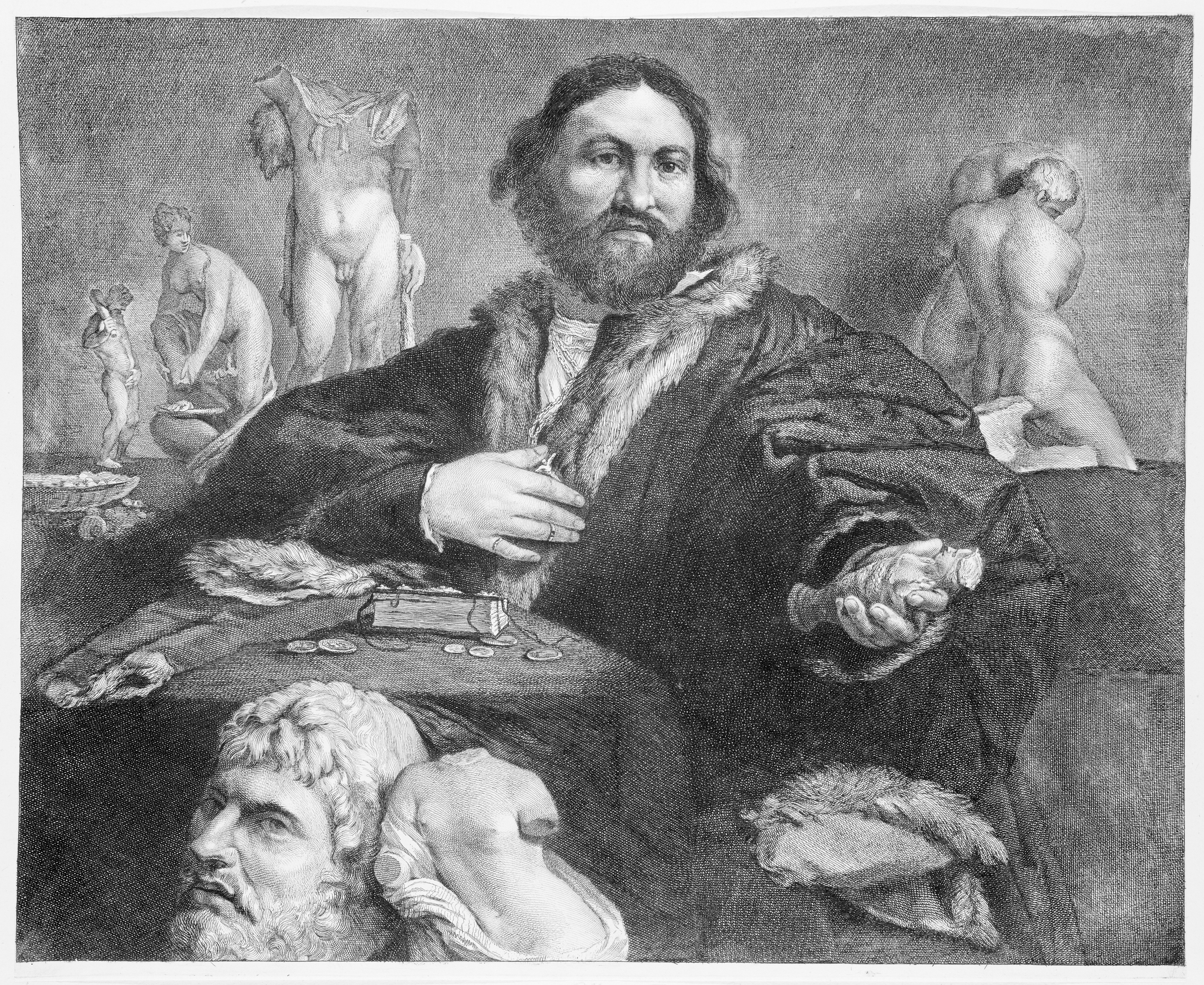
Andrea Odoni by Cornelis Visscher, after 1640, Metropolitan Museum of Art

The horizontal format, with which Lotto had already experimented for portraits of couples, was adopted here for a single subject, a merchant Renaissance humanist portrayed as though among his collection of marbles from classical antiquity. Most of the objects are identifiable and well-known, and are shown here either as other versions (some reduced in size) or as plaster casts. The head of the Emperor Hadrian in the right-hand foreground probably does represent a piece Odoni owned, a cast of piece now in Naples. Others may have belonged to Lotto's studio rather than to Odoni.

The man wears a rich, dark, fur-lined jacket. He sits next to a table, on which there lies a book and some ancient coins. In his hand he holds a small statue of Diana of Ephesus. The other hand touching the heart is a gesture characteristic of Lotto's work.

Art historian Monica Schmitter, in her book, The Art Collector in Early Modern Italy: Andrea Odoni and his Venetian Palace, argues that in the painting, "Odoni invites us to commune with, an imaginary collection, concocted by artist and patron together, to reflect on the very nature of collecting and of art itself."

== Provenance ==
The painting was mentioned in 1532 by Marcantonio Michiel, when it was owned by the sitter, Andrea Odoni. It was also seen by Giorgio Vasari, presumably on his visit to Venice in 1545. After Odoni's death, it was in an inventory of the collection of his brother and heir, Alvise Odoni in 1555. It later passed to Lucas van Uffelen, probably by 1623, then to Gerrit Reynst, 1639, then to the States of Holland and West Friesland for presentation to Charles II of England as part of the Dutch Gift of 1660. When the painting was in Amsterdam, in the Van Uffelen collection (Van Uffelen returned to live there in 1630) or in the Reynst Collection, it was engraved, in reverse like most engravings of that period, by Cornelis Visscher.

== See also ==
- Portrait of a Gentleman with a Lion Paw
