= Gesetz zur Beschränkung des Brief-, Post- und Fernmeldegeheimnisses =

German law to regulate its intelligence agencies

The Act on Restrictions on the Secrecy of Mail, Post and Telecommunications, Gesetz zur Beschränkung des Brief-, Post- und Fernmeldegeheimnisses in German, also known as the G-10 Act, is a German federal law that regulates the surveillance powers of Germany's intelligence agencies. The shortened and more commonly used name, ‘G-10’, refers to Article 10 of the German Basic Law, which enshrines the right to privacy of communication: It is from these provisions that the law seeks to derogate.

It is similar to Britain's Regulation of Investigatory Powers Act 2000 and is comparable to the Foreign Intelligence Surveillance Act of the United States.

Although the G-10 Act imposes nominal restrictions on the ability of Germany's intelligence agencies to spy on private communications, the law also allows warrantless automated wiretaps of domestic and international communications to prevent terrorist attacks and to maintain national security.

== See also ==
- Intelligence Act (France)
- Investigatory Powers Act 2016 (UK)
