= Mounir Mahjoubi =

French entrepreneur and politician (born 1984)

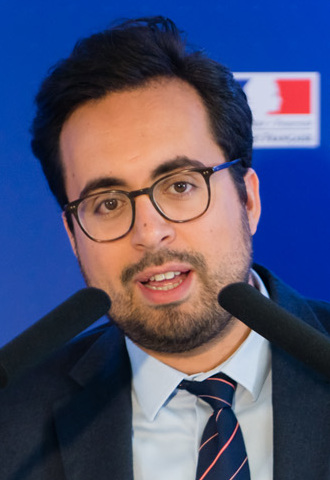

Member of the National Assembly for Paris's 16th constituency
- In office 28 April 2019 – 21 June 2022
- Preceded by: Delphine O
- Succeeded by: Sarah Legrain
- In office 21 June 2017 – 21 July 2017
- Preceded by: Jean-Christophe Cambadélis
- Succeeded by: Delphine O

Secretary of State for the Digital Sector
- In office 17 May 2017 – 27 March 2019
- President: Emmanuel Macron
- Prime Minister: Édouard Philippe
- Preceded by: Christophe Sirugue
- Succeeded by: Cédric O

President of the French Digital Council
- In office 5 February 2016 – 19 January 2017
- Preceded by: Benoît Thieulin
- Succeeded by: Marie Ekeland

Personal details
- Born: 1 March 1984 (age 42) Paris, France
- Party: LREM (2017—present)
- Other political affiliations: PS (before 2017)
- Education: Sciences Po

Mounir Mahjoubi (born 1 March 1984) is a French entrepreneur and politician of La République En Marche! (LREM) who served as a member of the National Assembly from June to July 2017 and from 2019 to 2022. From 2017 until 2019 was the Secretary of State for Digital Affairs in the government of Prime Minister Édouard Philippe.

A former President of the French Digital Council, Mahjoubi resigned in January 2017 to join the presidential campaign of Emmanuel Macron as digital manager.

== Early life ==
Mahjoubi was born in the 12th arrondissement of Paris to working class Moroccan parents who emigrated in the 1970s from Afourar, Beni Mellal. His father was a decorator and his mother a housekeeper.

Mahjoubi was very technological as a child and even won an Young Inventors competition organized by children's science magazine, Science et Vie Junior He was employed by internet provider, Club Internet, when he was 16 and the company eventually training him to be a network technician. He was also employed as a trade union representative for the union, CFDT.

Mahjoubi obtained a master's degree in finance and strategy from the Paris Institute of Political Studies in 2009. He was a member of the Olivaint Conference, one of the oldest and private student societies in French history.

== Private sector career ==
Mahjoubi founded Equanum along with Guilhem Chéron and Marc-David Choukroun in 2010, a company which develops and gives farmers and artisans a dedicated Internet platform to sell their product. Mahjoubi left the company in 2012 to work on the Hollande campaign.

Mahjoubi was Deputy General Manager for BETC Digital from 2013 to 2016. In September 2016, he founded the "French Bureau", a start-up company that aims to accompany major groups in their innovation process.

== Political career ==
=== Early political activities ===
Mahjoubi joined the Socialist Party when he was 18. In 2006, he helped create the "Segosphere" movement to assist 2007 Presidential candidate, Ségolène Royal. He supported Francois Hollande's campaign for the 2012 presidential elections and even worked on it, assisting with the digital aspect.

Mahjoubi was nominated by President Hollande as Chairman of the Conseil national du numérique (French Digital Council) in 2016, succeeding Benoît Thieulin. The priority projects of the council under his guidance were the digital transformation of Small and medium-sized enterprises and universities.

=== La République En Marche! career ===
In 2017, he resigned from the council and joined En Marche! serving as digital manager of Macron's campaign team. On 6 April 2017, Mahjoubi was selected as candidate for the 16th constituency of Paris for the legislative elections, running under La République en marche! label. He ran against Jean-Christophe Cambadélis, the First Secretary of the Socialist Party, who had represented the district as lawmaker for 20 straight years. Mahjoubi later won the seat with 51% of the vote in the second round.

Mahjoubi was nominated Secretary of State for Digital Affairs by Édouard Philippe on 17 May 2017. In a 2018 reshuffle of Philippe's government, Mahjoubi's department has been restructured; he now reports to Finance Minister Bruno Le Maire.

Mahjoubi announced on 6 March 2019 his candidacy as LREM candidate for the 2020 Paris municipal election. To be able to devote himself to this candidacy, he left the government on 27 March and thus reinstated his seat in the National Assembly. He subsequently served on the Committee on Foreign Affairs. He did not compete in the 2022 legislative election.

== Political positions ==
At a parliamentary hearing in 2020, Mahjoubi criticized the head of Amazon's France unit that the latter was "taking the piss" after telling a parliamentary committee that the company paid the French state 420 million euros ($508 million) in 2019 and had sales of 5.7 billion euros.

== Personal life ==
In 2015, Mahjoubi became a qualified cook after completing a Certificat d'aptitude professionnelle cuisine course. On the International Day Against Homophobia, Transphobia and Biphobia (17 May) 2018, Mahjoubi came out as gay via Twitter.
