= EYeka =

eYeka, S.A.
- Company type: Private
- Founded: Paris, France (2001)
- Headquarters: Paris, France
- Key people: Gilles Babinet (President); François Pétavy (CEO)
- Website: www.eYeka.net www.eYeka.com

eYeka (/aj kɑ/) is an online crowdsourcing and co-creation platform that allows brands to announce and conduct contests through the Internet. Companies create sets of questions, called "community briefs" or "call-for-entries", to which people can respond by submitting visual creations.

== Development ==
eYeka was founded in Paris, France, in 2006 by Gilles Babinet and Frank Perrier as an online platform that enabled brands, media, content owners, and mobile operators to operate their own media. The name "eYeka" was chosen as a combination of the English word "eye" and the Egyptian word "ka", meaning spirit. The company received its seed funding of €5 million from Ventech, DN Capital, and SFR Développement SAS. The French venture capital firm, I-Source, became an investor in January 2010, and eYeka raised €3 million in its second round of financing. In 2010, eYeka opened offices in London, the United Kingdom, and Singapore.

Over time, eYeka's focus changed from operating user-generated content channels to hosting creative contests online. Since 2008, eYeka has exclusively hosted online co-creation contests for brands and nonprofit or public organizations. Its first community participants were photographers and videomakers. By December 2010, eYeka had about 100,000 members. Companies use the material posted by the members to guide new product development, to gather marketing, and/or to obtain user-generated content.

In early 2011, eYeka launched in San Francisco and New York City and increased its membership to about 150,000. In late 2011, Japanese advertising agency Asatsu-DK acquired exclusive distribution rights for eYeka's platform in Japan. The company's sales increased by about 80% in 2011, and eYeka secured a venture loan through Generis Capital Partners for expansion into Brazil, Mexico, and Korea.

In 2011, eYeka launched an online interface called "beYond", which allows client organizations to find, manage, and share crowdsourcing projects.

In April 2012, eYeka was selected as a winner of Red Herring's Top 100 Europe Award. In 2012, eYeka organized a contest to support UNESCO's World Press Freedom Day.

In 2015, the company employed about 50 people. By this time, it had posted about 400 contests; it had 200,000 content creators from 94 countries and a number of corporate clients.
