= Wetware (biology) =

The term wetware is used to describe the protocols and molecular devices used in molecular biology and synthetic biology.

Where biological components and systems are treated in a similar manner to software, and similar development models and methodologies are applied, the term 'wetware' can be used to imply an approach to their problems as 'bugs' and their beneficial aspects as 'features'. In this manner, genetic code can be subjected to Version Control Systems such as Git, for the development of improvements and new gene edits, therapeutic components and therapies.

== Examples ==
The National Science Foundation (NSF) funded Wiki project Open Wetware (OWW) provides a resource for reagent, project and laboratory notebook sharing.

A somewhat related NSF consortium Synthetic Biology Engineering Research Center (SynBERC) constructed and distributed wetware. It was succeeded in 2016 by the Engineering Biology Research Consortium.
