= Sarah Legrain =

French politician (born 1985)

Member of the National Assembly for Paris's 16th constituency
- Incumbent
- Assumed office 22 June 2022
- Preceded by: Mounir Mahjoubi

Personal details
- Born: Sarah Nathalie Legrain; 17 November 1985 (age 40) Paris, France
- Party: La France Insoumise (2016-present)
- Education: École Normale Supérieure
- Profession: Teacher

Sarah Legrain (born 17 November 1985) is a French teacher and politician. A member of La France Insoumise (LFI), she was elected to represent the 16th constituency of Paris in the National Assembly in the first round of the 2022 legislative election. She was re-elected in the first round of the 2024 French legislative election.

== See also ==
- List of deputies of the 16th National Assembly of France
- List of deputies of the 17th National Assembly of France
