= Bernard Pons =

French politician and medical doctor (1926–2022)

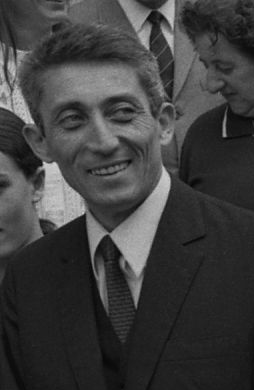
- Pons in 1969

Minister of Transport
- In office 18 May 1995 – 2 June 1997
- President: Jacques Chirac
- Prime Minister: Alain Juppé
- Preceded by: Bernard Bosson
- Succeeded by: Jean-Claude Gayssot

Member of the National Assembly for Paris's 16th constituency
- In office 25 May 1997 – 18 June 2002
- Preceded by: Pierre Rémond
- Succeeded by: Françoise de Panafieu

Personal details
- Born: 18 July 1926 Béziers, France
- Died: 27 April 2022 (aged 95) Aigues-Mortes, France
- Party: RPR
- Education: Lycée Thiers

Bernard Pons (18 July 1926 – 27 April 2022) was a French politician and medical doctor who was a member of the Union of Democrats for the Republic from 1971 to 1976 and a member of the Rally for the Republic party thereafter. He served as Secretary General of Rally for the Republic, Minister for Transport, and continued as a special advisor to the Union for a Popular Movement until 2008 after his retirement from active politics in 2002.

== Early life ==
Born Claude Bernard Pons on 18 July 1926 in Béziers, Pons qualified as a doctor and worked as a general practitioner.

== Political career ==
Pons was elected to the lower house of the French parliament in 1967 and served as a member of this house until 2002. He served in the Ministry of Agriculture from 22 June 1969 to 28 March 1973. In the government of Jacques Chirac, he served as Minister for Overseas Territory and travelled to Noumea to solve the Ouvéa cave hostage taking situation. In the government of Alain Juppé, he served as Minister of Transport.

Pons played a role in helping the Cahors wine region to regain its reputation. He successfully lobbied for Appellation d'origine contrôlée for the region. This brought significant money to the region.

In December 1997 he was appointed a commander of the Order of Tahiti Nui.

Governmental functions

Secretary of State for Agriculture: 1969–1973

Minister of Overseas Departments and Territories: 1986–1988

Minister of Planning, Infrastructure and Transport: May–November 1995

Minister of Equipment, Housing, Transport and Tourism: 1995–1997

Electoral mandates

European Parliament

Member of the European Parliament: 1984–1985 (Resignation). Elected in 1984

National Assembly of France

President of the Rally for the Republic Group in the National Assembly: 1988–1995 (Became minister in 1995). Elected in 1988, reelected in 1993

Member of the National Assembly of France for Lot's 2nd constituency: 1967–1969 (Became secretary of State in 1969) / 1973–1978. Elected in 1967, reelected in 1968, 1973

Member of the National Assembly of France for Essonne's 2nd constituency: 1978–1981. Elected in 1978

Member of the National Assembly of France for Paris's 22nd constituency: 1981–1986 (Became minister in 1986)

Member of the National Assembly of France for Paris's 16th constituency: 1988–1993 (Became minister in 1995) / 1997–2002. Elected in 1981, reelected in 1986, 1988, 1993, 1997

General Council

General councillor of Lot (department): 1967–1979. Reelected in 1973

Municipal Council

Councillor of Paris: 1983–2008. Reelected in 1989, 1995, 2001
