= Portrait of a Gentleman with a Lion Paw =

Painting by Lorenzo Lotto

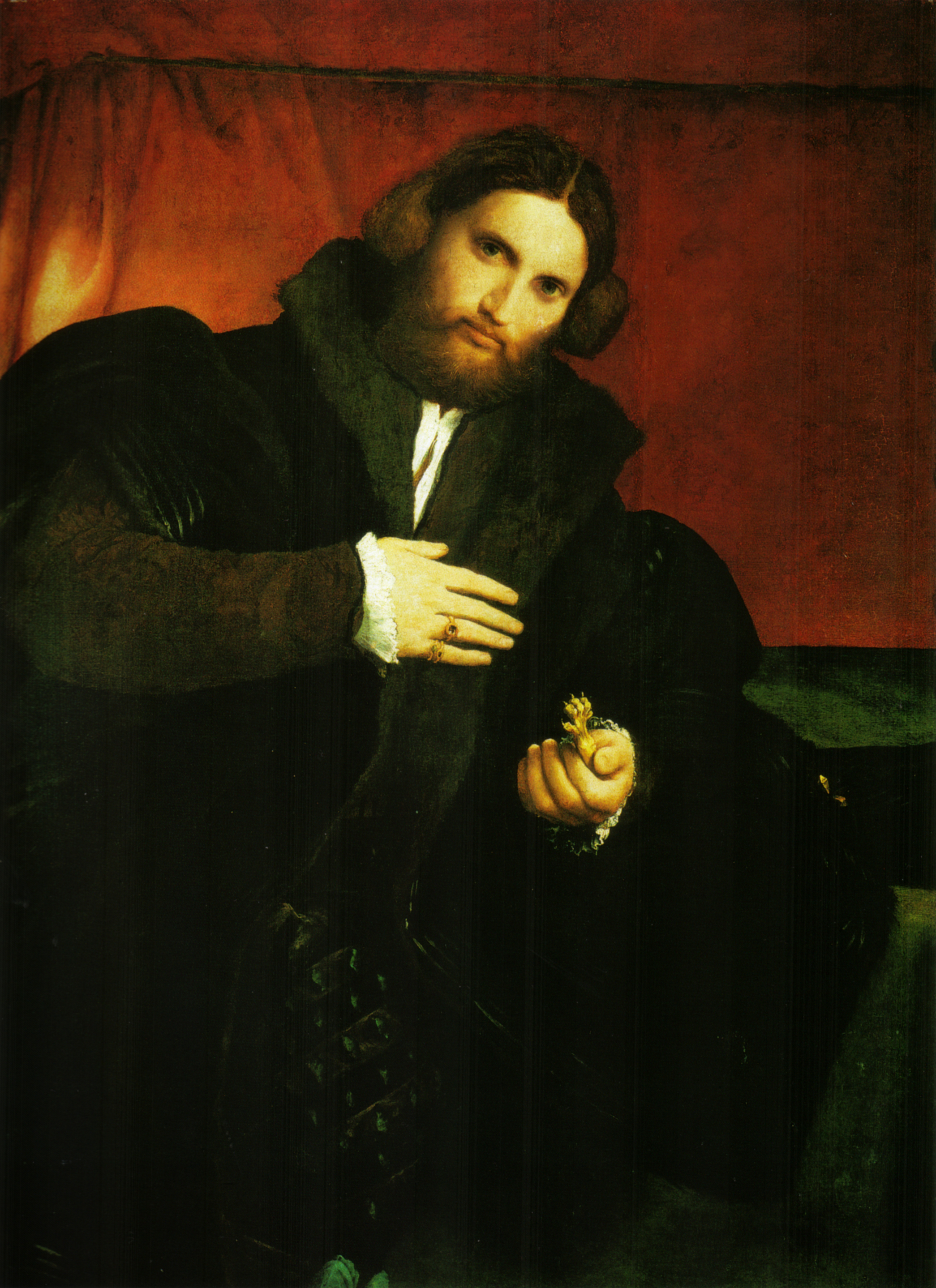
- Artist: Lorenzo Lotto
- Year: c. 1524–1525
- Medium: Oil on canvas
- Dimensions: 95.5 cm × 69.5 cm (37.6 in × 27.4 in)
- Location: Kunsthistorisches Museum; Vienna

The Portrait of a Gentleman with a Lion Paw is an oil-on-canvas painting by the Italian High Renaissance painter Lorenzo Lotto, dating c. 1524–1525. It is housed in the Kunsthistorisches Museum, in Vienna.

== History ==
The work's history can be traced from 1679, when it was listed in the collection of Archduke Leopold Wilhelm of Austria. Neither the identity of the sitter nor the date the portrait was painted is known, although the work has been assigned to Lotto's early Venetian period, when he carried out commissions for several private patrons.

== Description ==
The work shows a gentleman wearing a rich, fur-lined black coat. He stands in front of a rich red and a green textile background and shows us a gilt lion's paw. His right hand, in a gesture typical of Lotto, touches his heart, showing two valuable rings. The composition and the colors show the influence of Titian, then the most respected painter in Venice.

The symbolic meaning of the lion's paw is not clear. It could be an allusion to the subject's name, perhaps Leonino Brambati of Bergamo, or a member of the Venetian Zatta family (zatta in Venetian means "paw"). It has also been suggested that the lion's paw has masonic significance.

== See also ==
- Portrait of Andrea Odoni

== Sources ==
- Pirovano, Carlo (2002). Lotto. Milan: Electa.
