= Salwa Toko =

French diversity and digital literacy activist (born 1975)

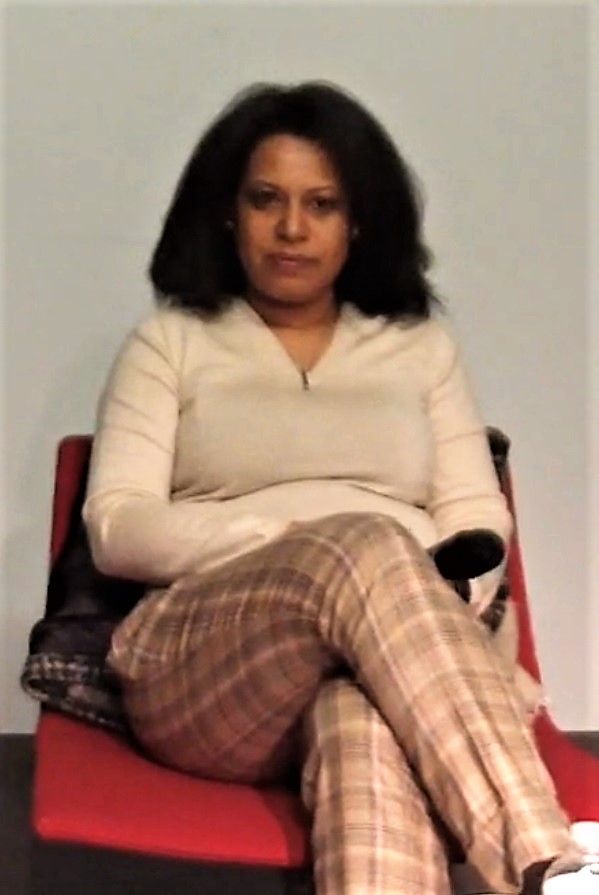
- Toko in 2019
- Born: October 1975 (age 50–51); 5th arrondissement of Paris, France
- Education: Sciences Po
- Employer: Conseil national du numérique

Salwa Toko (born October 1975) is a diversity and digital literacy activist. She is President of the Conseil National du Numérique (CNNum).

== Early life and education ==
Toko was born in the 5th arrondissement of Paris. Her mother is of Moroccan, Syrian and Lebanese heritage and her father is from Nigeria and Benin. Her grandmother fought for women's rights in Arab countries. Toko grew up in Mali and attended high school in France. Whilst she had initially intended on studying medicine at college, she switched to law and specialised in international law. Toko completed her specialist science training at Sciences Po.

== Career ==
Toko was appointed Director of a television channel in Benin in 2000. Toko founded the Senegal the Africatic school which helped young people integrate internet in their work. Toko returned to France in 2009, where she joined the Fondation Agir Contre l'Exclusion (FACE). FACE looks to connect the business world with education. In 2014 Toko established WiFilles, a group within FACE that looks empower women in digital literacy. As part of WiFilles Toko trains teenage girls in digital skills including computer programming, web development and robotics. The girls are recruited from middle school. The organisation has been recognised by François Hollande, who awarded Toko the program La France s'engage, a €200,000 prize, and supported by Orange S.A.

In April 2018 Toko launched Becomtech, an EdTech organisation that supports women after their baccalauréat, Becomtech offers three to five week coding programmes across France and is funded by Total Foundation and Maïf.

Toko was selected by Mounir Mahjoubi as the President of the Conseil National du Numérique (CNNum) in 2018. Her role is to reflect on major issues facing the French tech sector. She has called for people to consider laws to protect workers on zero-hours contracts, and has said that Uber and Deliveroo workers can be considered the precursors to robots under current employment law. She was inducted into L'Académie des Sciences Techniques Comptables in 2019. She was selected by E-commerce magazine as one of the top women in technology in 2019. In France only 10% of engineering students are women and only 3% of cyber security specialists are women. In her capacity as President of CNNum Toko advocates for more diversity in technology.
