= MXP4 =

Music game developer and data format

- Website type: Online social music games
- Headquarters: Paris, {{{location_country}}}
- Website: www.mxp4.com
- Commercial: Yes
- Launched: 2008
- Current status: Inactive since 2013

MXP4 was a social music game developer and a former music services company with headquarters in Paris, France. It was co-founded in 2008 to create an interactive music solution that enabled music fans to play with and modify songs. The company then shifted into a social music game developer, under the name "Bopler," in late 2010. The MXP4 music format enabled labels and artists to package multimedia content – streaming music, videos, artist bio, concert listings, share buttons for social networks, and merchandise links - into a single .mxp4 file, which could be accessed via a web-based application. The MXP4 applications also offered interactive features enabling users to play with, remix and sing along with tracks.

MXP4 changed its focus and became a B-to-C player with the creation of the Bopler brand in 2010. Bopler was one of the few social music gaming platforms present on Facebook. License contracts were signed with the main actors in the music industry to enable the legal use of tracks in its games. The company attempted to expand beyond Facebook and prepare the launch of music games across all digital platforms (online, mobile and tablets); but the company's Facebook page has not been active since 2013, and the domain www.mxp4.com is currently for sale.

== History ==
The company was founded in 2008 by Gilles Babinet, Sylvain Huet and Philippe Ulrich. Albin Serviant (former GM at Vivendi Mobile Entertainment and MUSIWAVE CMO) is CEO, whilst industry leading board members include JF Cecillon (former CEO of EMI Music) and Jordan Greenhall (former CEO and chairman of DivX). The company was backed by investors Sofinnova Partners, Ventech and Orkos Capital.

The company worked with labels and artists including Motown, Britney Spears, Pink, Basement Jaxx, Bat For Lashes, Paramore, Pet Shop Boys and David Guetta to create interactive versions of their tracks.

In July 2009 MXP4 and Motown released MXP4 versions of Jackson 5 songs that allowed fans to strip each track down to its stems, including Michael Jackson's original vocals, and recombine them to create a personal mix.

In October 2009, MXP4 and French DJ/producer David Guetta launched the first MXP4-powered iPhone app, that allowed users to remix his track When Love Takes Over on their iPhones.

In January 2010 MXP4 launched a new feature called "Max It", which creates remixes of tracks in real-time while the user listens, and built a Max It editor that allowed artists to create interactive music apps.

In late 2010, MXP4 shifted its focus towards the creation of social music games. Having signed license contracts with rights owners in the music industry (labels and publishers), it created the brand Bopler and launched the music games portal Bopler Games in May 2011, available on Facebook. Bopler Tap Tour followed in March 2012, then Bopler Rock Tour in June 2012, both music-tapping games on Facebook where the player played a series of concerts and plays to popular songs, gathering "fans" and collecting "stars" along the way.

== Brand partnerships ==
In February 2010, MXP4 and Air France launched an interactive Facebook music application with the band Phoenix, to promote the launch of the Air France Music onboard service.

In March 2010, Brand Asset Group built an application for Coca-Cola's "MyCoke" web presence powered by MXP4, with an interactive version of the song 'Are You Getting Enough Happiness' by Janelle Monáe.

Since then, MXP4 has partnered brands such as Diesel Music, Cofinoga, etc.
