= Paris's 16th constituency =

Constituency of the National Assembly of France

16th constituency of Paris
- inline Constituency of the National Assembly of France

- Paris, showing its post 2012 legislative constituencies
- Deputy: Sarah Legrain; LFI
- Department: Paris
- Cantons: 19th arrondissement of Paris (part)

The 16th constituency of Paris is a French legislative constituency in Paris, which has existed since 2012. It is in the north-east of the city. It was created by the 2010 redistricting of French legislative constituencies. Before that, the 16th constituency referred to a constituency in the north-west, created by the 1986 redistricting. Before that, it was in the south of the city.

16th constituency of Paris
- inline Constituency of the National Assembly of France

- Paris, showing its legislative constituencies between 1988 and 2012
- Member: constituency abolished, 2012
- Department: Paris

Map of Paris constituencies in 1981.

== Historic representation ==
Election	Member	Party	Notes
1958	Christian de La Malène	CNIP	Joined government
1961	Lucien Carbon	UNR	Substitute for de La Malène
1962	Christian de La Malène	UNR	
1967	Christian de La Malène	UDR	
1968	Christian de La Malène	UDR	
1973	Christian de La Malène	CDP	
1978	Edwige Avice	PS	
1981	Edwige Avice	PS	Joined government
1981	Roger Rouquette	PS	Substitute for Avice
1986	Proportional representation - no election by constituency		
1988	Bernard Pons	RPR	
1993	Bernard Pons	RPR	Joined government
1995	Pierre Rémond	RPR	Substitute for Pons
1997	Bernard Pons	RPR	
2002	Françoise de Panafieu	UMP	
2007	Françoise de Panafieu	UMP	
2012	Jean-Christophe Cambadélis	PS	Previously deputy for Paris's 20th constituency, based on the same area of Paris
2017	Mounir Mahjoubi	LREM	Secretary of State for Digital Affairs July 2017 to 2019
2017	Delphine O	LREM	Substitute for Mahjoubi
2019	Mounir Mahjoubi	LREM	Retook seat after leaving government
2022	Sarah Legrain	LFI	
2024	Sarah Legrain	LFI	

== Election results ==
=== 2024 ===
Candidate	Party	Alliance	First round			Second round		
Candidate	Party	Alliance	Votes	%	+/–	Votes	%	+/–
Sarah Legrain	LFI	NFP	32,422	62.47	+0.51			
Elsa Pariente	RE	ENS	10,154	19.56	-0.88			
Christèle de Fromont de Bouaille	RN		4,829	9.30	+5.36			
Marie Toubiana	LR diss.		2,291	4.41	-1.43			
Victor Huguet	UDI		1,003	1.93	N/A			
Cecile Fischer	REC		506	0.97	-1.99			
Nordine El-Marbati	LO		409	0.79	-0.03			
Marie-Noëlle Blondel	DVC		287	0.55	N/A			
Hakima Khelfa	DIV		1	0.00	-0.56			
Hortense Villenave	EXG		0	0.00	N/A			
Valid votes			51,902	98.46	+0.23			
Blank votes			516	0.68	-0.38			
Null votes			296	0.56	+0.15			
Turnout			52,714	68.98	+19.19			
Abstentions			23,703	31.02	-19.19			
Registered voters			76,417					
Source: Ministry of the Interior, Le Monde
Result						LFI HOLD		

=== 2022 ===
Legislative Election 2022: Paris's 16th constituency
Party	Candidate	Votes	%	±%
LFI (NUPÉS)	Sarah Legrain	20,829	56.51	+13.04
LREM (Ensemble)	Yanis Bacha	7,534	20.44	−17.64
LR (UDC)	Marie Toubiana	2,153	5.84	−1.56
MDP	François Bechieau	2,142	5.81	N/A
RN	Nathalie Monsauret	1,454	3.94	−0.04
REC	Caroline Desgrange	1,092	2.96	N/A
Others	N/A	1,655		
Turnout		36,859	49.79	−1.16
LFI gain from LREM				

Sarah Legrain won in the first round.

=== 2017 ===
Legislative Election 2017: Paris's 16th constituency
Party	Candidate	Votes	%	±%
LREM	Mounir Mahjoubi	13,434	38.08	N/A
LFI	Sarah Legrain	7,350	20.84	N/A
EELV	Dan Lert	3,758	10.65	−0.47
PS	Jean-Christophe Cambadélis	3,035	8.60	−32.63
LR	Anne-Constance Onghena	2,611	7.40	−13.51
FN	Michel Bulte	1,404	3.98	−1.93
PCF	Sergio Tinti	1,192	3.38	−9.26
Others	N/A	2,168		
Turnout		35,862	50.95	
2nd round result
LREM	Mounir Mahjoubi	15,263	51.18	N/A
LFI	Sarah Legrain	14,562	48.82	N/A
Turnout		31,747	45.11	
LREM gain from PS		Swing		

=== 2012 ===
2012 legislative election in Paris's 16th constituency
Candidate	Party	First round		Second round	
Candidate	Party	Votes	%	Votes	%
Jean-Christophe Cambadélis	PS	14,864	41.23%	22,734	70.04%
Jean-Jacques Giannesini	UMP	7,538	20.91%	9,725	29.96%
Sergio Tinti	FG	4,556	12.64%		
Bernard Jomier	EELV	4,009	11.12%		
Michel Ciardi	FN	2,131	5.91%		
Violette Baranda	MoDem	1,071	2.97%		
Adrien Havas	PP	441	1.22%		
Christian Ghiotti	PPLD	333	0.92%		
Wafa Guiga	NPA	220	0.61%		
Marina Podgorny	LO	188	0.52%		
Mustapha Saadi	PR	163	0.45%		
Serge Sebban	POI	163	0.45%		
Thierry Rochas	NC	157	0.44%		
Rudy Kazi	PCD	85	0.24%		
Thierry Broutin	AR	66	0.18%		
Irène Akoun	DVD (PDL)	64	0.18%		
Valid votes		36,049	98.99%	32,459	96.07%
Spoilt and null votes		367	1.01%	1,327	3.93%
Votes cast / turnout		36,416	54.98%	33,786	51.02%
Abstentions		29,814	45.02%	32,434	48.98%
Registered voters		66,230	100.00%	66,220	100.00%

=== 2007 ===
Elections between 1988 and 2007 were based on the 1988 boundaries.

Map of Paris Constituencies, 1988-2007 elections

Legislative Election 2007: Paris's 16th constituency
Party	Candidate	Votes	%	±%
UMP	Françoise De Panafieu	22,695	64.68	
PRG	Christine Goudert-Martin	4,385	12.50	
MoDem	Olivier Mousson	4,029	11.48	
FN	Danièle Lancon	1,111	3.17	
LV	Yves Contassot	1,087	3.10	
Others	N/A	1,779		
Turnout		35,337	63.72	
UMP hold				

=== 2002 ===
Legislative Election 2002: Paris's 16th constituency
Party	Candidate	Votes	%	±%
DVD	Françoise de Panafieu	14,217	40.83	
UMP	Bernard Pons*	7,779	22.34	
PS	Nelly Oehlhaffen	5,414	15.55	
FN	Danièle Lancon	2,124	6.10	
DVD	Atanase Périfan	1,737	4.99	
LV	Camille Cabral	832	2.39	
MPF	Alexandre Varaut	719	2.07	
Others	N/A	1,995		
Turnout		35,116	70.64	
2nd round result
DVD	Françoise de Panafieu	18,688	100.00	
Turnout		22,622	45.52	
DVD gain from RPR				

* Withdrew before the 2nd round

=== 1997 ===
Legislative Election 1997: Paris's 16th constituency
Party	Candidate	Votes	%	±%
RPR	Bernard Pons	17,206	53.63	
PS	Elizabeth Larrieu	5,276	16.44	
FN	Danièle Deleuze	3,325	10.36	
DVD	Alexandre Varaut	1,924	6.00	
LV	Martine Auber	1,175	3.66	
PCF	Geneviève Jollet	740	2.31	
Others	N/A	2,438		
Turnout		33,026	63.27	
RPR hold				
