= Linda Liukas =

Finnish programming instructor and children's writer

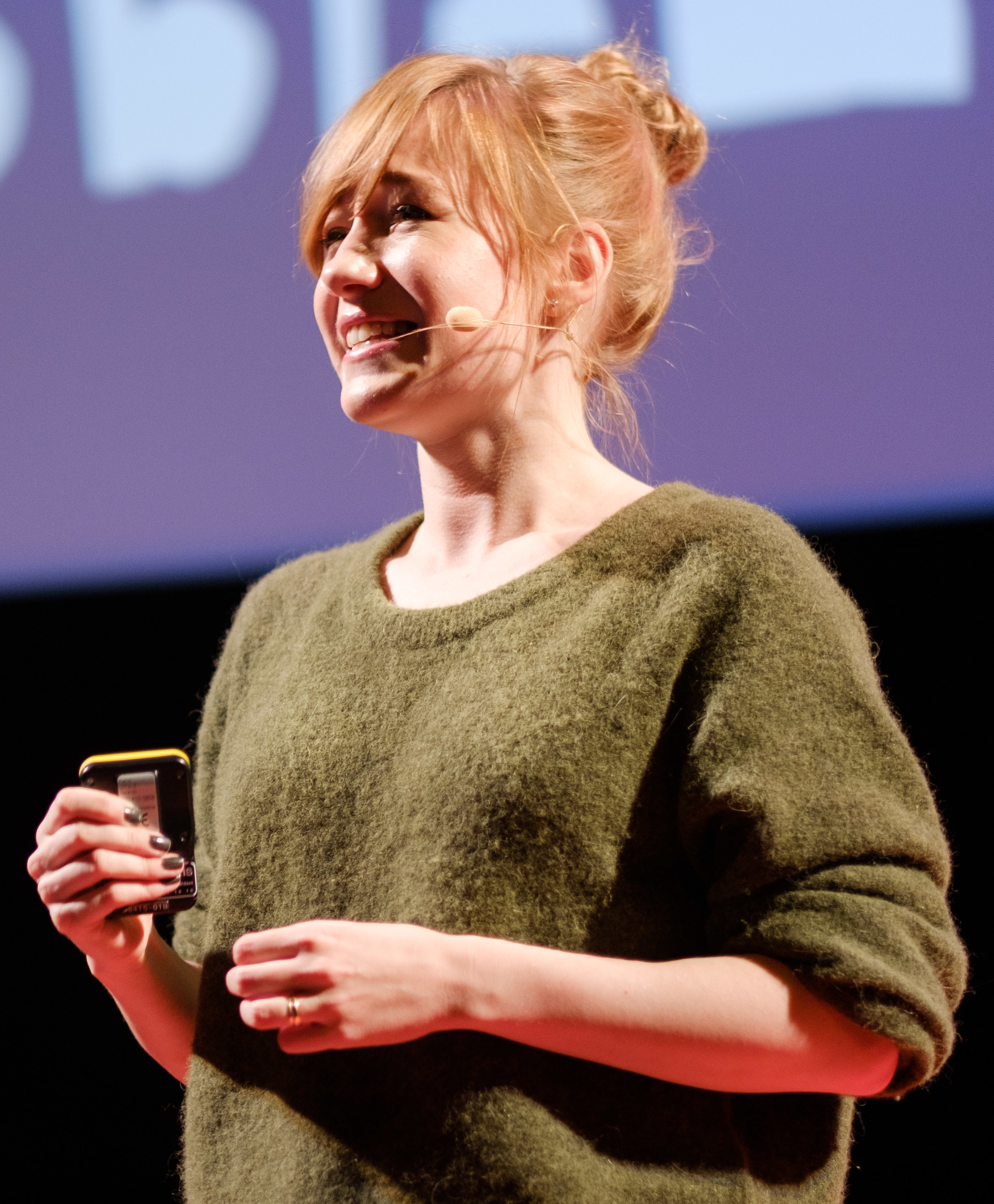
- Liukas at the Data of Tomorrow Conference 2017
- Born: 1986 (age 39–40); Finland
- Occupation: Children's book author
- Website: lindaliukas.com

Linda Liukas (born 1986) is a Finnish children's book author, illustrator and an instructor for beginner programmers. In 2014, her Hello Ruby coding book for children raised $380,000 on Kickstarter becoming the platform's most highly funded children's book.

In 2013, the European Commission gave Linda Liukas the title of "Digital Champion of Finland".

In October 2015, Liukas delivered a keynote talk at TEDxCERN.

== Career ==
When she was 13, Liukas first showed an interest in creating websites. In 2001, she made a page in Finnish about Al Gore, hoping to show him how much she admired his values, not to mention his looks. For the next ten years she studied philosophy, business, French and engineering but maintained an interest in programming. When she was 23, she once again became interested in the web. She co-founded Rails Girls, a site designed to help women learn basic programming. Thanks to her involvement, the approach has become a worldwide success, leading to workshops in over 160 cities. Liukas also works with the online training platform Codecademy which provides courses free of charge.

Liukas also started to learn the programming language Ruby but encountered a number of difficulties. She sorted them out by drawing pictures featuring a little girl called Ruby: "Whenever I ran into a problem that I didn't understand, I'd think 'how would Ruby explain this?'." Initially Ruby was a side-line Liukas created for herself drawing sketches of the little red-haired girl encountering a snow leopard or sorting out problems with penguins and green robots. When Liukas showed her approach to her friends, they encouraged her to publish the illustrations and explanations in book form. After a number of revisions and improvements, the book was scheduled for publication on 6 October 2015.
