= Delphine O =

French politician (born 1985)

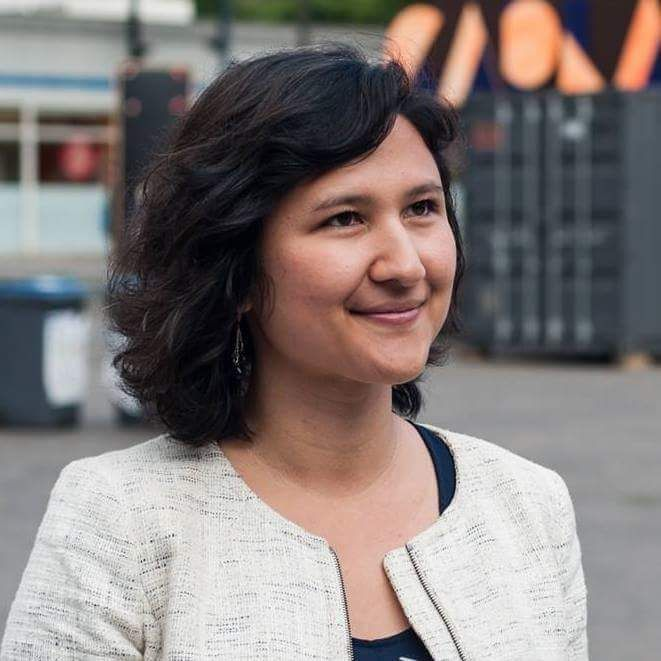
- O in 2017

Member of the National Assembly for Paris's 16th constituency
- In office 22 July 2017 – 27 April 2019
- Preceded by: Mounir Mahjoubi
- Succeeded by: Mounir Mahjoubi

Personal details
- Born: 25 December 1985 (age 40) Mont-Saint-Aignan, France
- Party: La République En Marche!
- Relatives: Cédric O (brother)
- Education: École normale supérieure New Sorbonne University; Freie Universität Berlin; Pantheon-Sorbonne University; John F. Kennedy School of Government
- Occupation: Business executive

Delphine O (born 25 December 1985) is a French politician and a former member of the French National Assembly, who represented Paris. She is the Secretary General of the Generation Equality Forum 2021.

== Early life and education ==
Born to a French mother and a Korean father, Delphine O grew up in Lyon. She graduated from the rue d'Ulm École normale supérieure, in the Letters section in 2004. She also holds a diploma from the New Sorbonne University and she specialized in Franco-German relations and European politics at Pantheon-Sorbonne University. She was an intern at the French Ministry of Foreign Affairs at the French embassy in South Korea between 2007 and 2008 and then worked at the consulate general of France in New York from 2010 to 2012.

Graduate of the Harvard Kennedy School's Master in Public Policy (living in Iran for one year to write her master's degree: "Iranian Politics in Afghanistan"), she graduated in geopolitics of the Middle East. She works with ActionAid in Kabul, Afghanistan, on Afghan women's participation in local democratic life and on women's rights. After several stays in Iran, she moved to Tehran for a few months in 2015.

Back in France, she co-founded an online media, Lettres Persanes, which aims to better inform the French public on the news of politics, the economy, society and culture of Iran and sells services of counseling and training.

== Political career ==
O joined En Marche! from the creation of the movement. A member of the group of experts on international affairs who drew up the foreign policy program of Emmanuel Macron, coordinator of the national mobilization of working-class neighborhoods, she has been involved in local actions in the 19th arrondissement of Paris since the beginning of the campaign presidential election: tugging, door-to-door, program development workshops, organization of public meetings.

=== Member of the National Assembly ===
O was selected as the alternate to Mounir Mahjoubi, who was elected to the French National Assembly on 18 June 2017 representing the 16th constituency of Paris, and subsequently took her seat in the National Assembly on 22 July following the appointment of Mahjoubi to the second Philippe government the previous month.

In the National Assembly, O sat on the Foreign Affairs Committee. She was a rapporteur of the Working Group on the opening of the National Assembly to society and its scientific and cultural influence, the mission of information on the universal national service and vice-president of the International Study Group on the Issues of the Democratic People's Republic of Korea (North Korea). She was a President of France-Iran Friendship Group and vice-president of France-Turkey Friendship Group.

Mounir Mahjoubi having left the government and automatically regaining his parliamentary seat, she left the National Assembly in April 2019.

In May 2019, O was appointed Ambassador and Secretary General of the UN World Conference on Women.

== Other activities ==
- European Council on Foreign Relations (ECFR), Member
- French Institute for International and Strategic Affairs (IRIS), Member of the Board of Directors

== See also ==
- 2017 French legislative election
