= Cédric O =

French politician (born 1982)

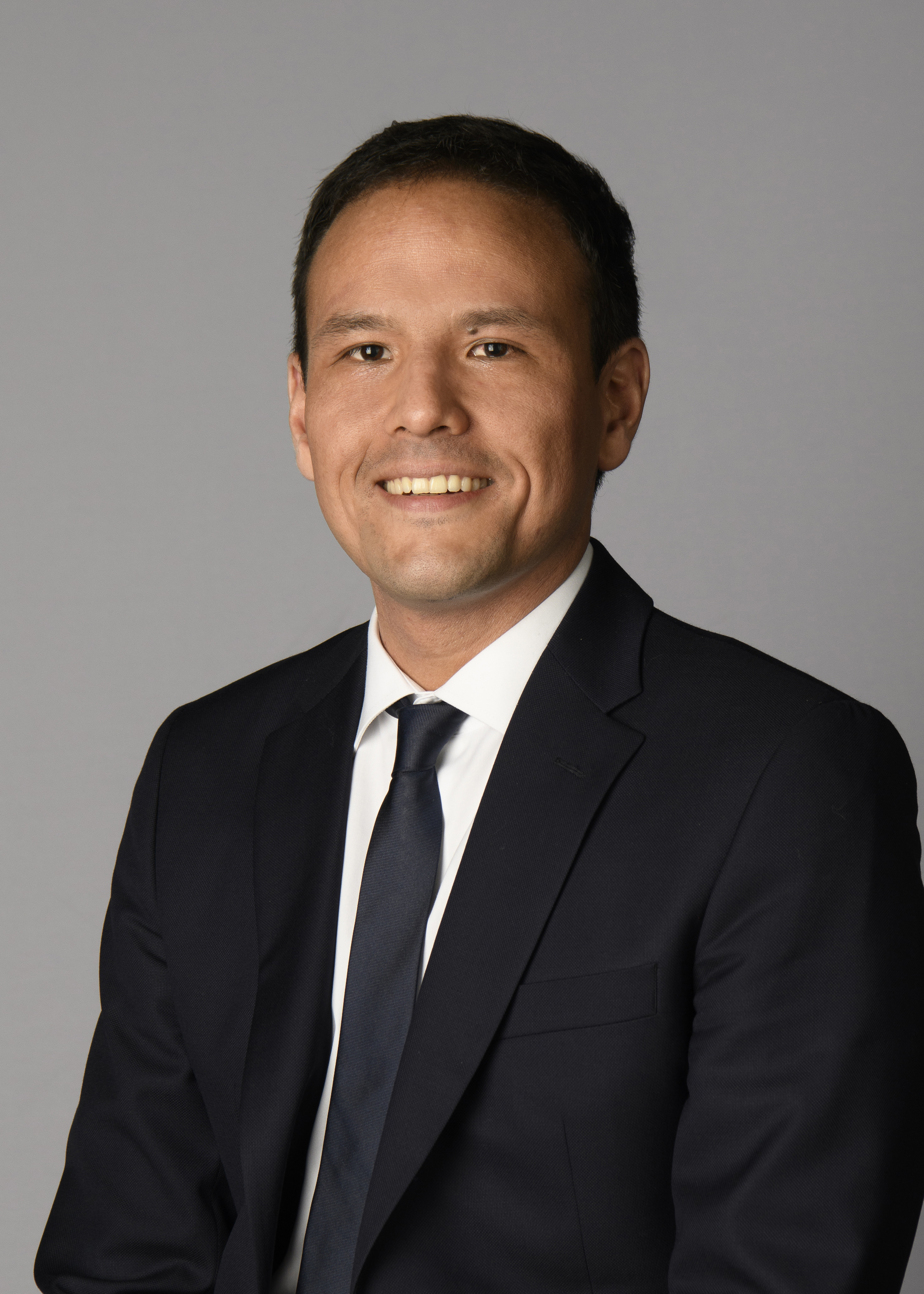

Secretary of State for the Digital Sector
- In office 31 March 2019 – 20 May 2022
- President: Emmanuel Macron
- Prime Minister: Édouard Philippe; Jean Castex
- Preceded by: Mounir Mahjoubi
- Succeeded by: Jean-Noël Barrot

Personal details
- Born: 18 December 1982 (age 43) L'Arbresle, France
- Party: La République En Marche!
- Relatives: Delphine O (sister)
- Education: Lycée du Parc
- Alma mater: HEC Paris

Cédric O (born 18 December 1982) is a French politician of La République En Marche! (LREM) who served as Secretary of State (junior minister) for the Digital Economy in the governments of successive Prime Ministers Édouard Philippe and Jean Castex from 2019 to 2022.

O is a cofounder of the artificial intelligence startup Mistral AI.

== Early life and education ==
Cédric O, son of a French mother from Lyon and a Korean executive, was born on 18 December 1982. He is the brother of Delphine O, former member of the National Assembly for Paris's 16th constituency.

After graduating from Lycée du Parc, he enrolled at HEC Paris and graduated in 2006.

== Business career ==
In 2007, O started working as communications manager for the Operationelle corporation. Between 2014 and 2017, he was project manager for the Safran aircraft & rocket engine manufacturing company.

== Political career ==
Along with future La République En Marche! cadres Ismaël Emelien and Benjamin Griveaux, as well as HEC alumnus Stanislas Guerini, O participated in the campaign team of Dominique Strauss-Kahn for the 2006 French Socialist Party presidential primary.

After serving as political adviser to finance minister Pierre Moscovici, during the presidency of Socialist François Hollande, O was appointed treasurer of the La République En Marche! party in Emmanuel Macron's 2016–17 presidential campaign. In November 2017, O assumed the duties of political advisor to Macron and prime minister Édouard Philippe.

Also since November 2017, O has been part of LREM's executive board under the leadership of the party's successive chairmen Christophe Castaner and Stanislas Guerini.

On 31 March 2019, O was appointed Parliamentary Undersecretary for the Digital Economy, serving under the leadership of minister Bruno Le Maire. In this capacity, he has invited tech CEOs to meet with the French president about the so-called “tech for good" project, as well as venture capitalists to Paris to promote to them the purported benefits of investing in the French "tech ecosystem." Cédric O convinced Facebook to allow French regulators to investigate the company's moderation processes, and also arranged a meeting between Macron and Mark Zuckerberg.

On 26 July 2020, O was appointed State Secretary of Digital Transition and Electronic Communications. Among his tasks was the installation of the future 5G network in France.

== Life after politics ==
From 2022 to 2023, O served on the European Space Agency’s High-Level Advisory Group on Human and Robotic Space Exploration for Europe.

== Other activities ==
- European Council on Foreign Relations (ECFR), Member

== Political positions ==
Amid efforts to contain the COVID-19 pandemic in France, O was one of the early supporters of the government's proposal for a state-supported “StopCovid” contact-tracing app project. He later publicly accused Apple Inc. of undermining the effort by refusing to help make its iPhones more compatible with the app.

In a joint statement in October 2020, O and his Dutch counterpart Mona Keijzer called for a European Union authority to regulate large technology companies and argued that such an authority should be able to prevent digital platforms from blocking access to their services “unless they have an objective justification.”
