= Engineering Biology Research Consortium =

Non-profit, public-private partnership

The Engineering Biology Research Consortium (EBRC) is a non-profit, public-private partnership focused on advancing biotechnology and engineering biology to address broad societal needs.

== Mission ==
According to EBRC, the group is dedicated to bringing together an inclusive community committed to advancing engineering biology to address national and global needs.

"We showcase cutting-edge research in engineering biology, identify pressing challenges and opportunities in research and application, articulate compelling research roadmaps and programs to address them, and provide timely access to other key developments in engineering biology. Driven by member-led working groups, we focus on Research Roadmapping, Education, Security, and Policy & International Engagement."

== History, work, and membership ==
The EBRC was founded in 2016 by members of the 10-year NSF-funded Synthetic Biology Engineering Research Center (SynBERC) at the conclusion of the ERC grant period. During its grant period, SynBERC made significant contributions to the field of synthetic biology through research from members' labs, interactions between academic and industry members, and activities to support socially responsible innovation.

In 2022, EBRC entered into an agreement with NIST to develop tools for safe development of nucleic acid synthesis using artificial intelligence. In 2024, they partnered again with NIST to defend against misuse of AI in synthetic biology.

EBRC offers members tools and events to stay aligned with the evolution and growth of the synthetic biology community. EBRC develops new activities and programs to support and sustain the impact of research, products, discoveries, and ideas from the synthetic biology community.

EBRC also publishes reports for technical and research milestones to achieve certain scientific outcomes.

In 2026, EBRC expanded its programming to include national policy event partnerships with groups like the Federation of American Scientists and the National Security Commission on Emerging Biotechnology.

India Hook-Barnard has served as CEO of EBRC since 2021.

== Select publications ==
- Engineering Biology: A Research Roadmap for the Next-Generation Bioeconomy (2019)
- Microbiome Engineering: A Research Roadmap for the Next-Generation Bioeconomy (2020)
- Engineering Biology & Materials Science: A Research Roadmap for Interdisciplinary Innovation (2021)
- Engineering Biology for Climate & Sustainability: A Research Roadmap for a Cleaner Future (2024)
