= Kim Soun-Gui =

South Korean multimedia artist based in France

- 김순기
- Born: 1946 (age 79–80); Buyeo, South Korea
- Education: College of Fine Arts, Seoul National University, École Nationale d'Arts Décoratifs de Nice, Université d'Aix-en-Provence, Université de Nice
- Occupation: Artist
- Known for: Multimedia art

Korean name
- Hangul: 김순기
- RR: Gim Sungi
- MR: Kim Sun'gi
- Website: www.kimsoungui.com

Kim Soun-Gui (Korean: 김순기, b. 1946) is a South Korean multimedia artist based in France. Kim was born in Buyeo, South Korea. After graduating from the College of Fine Arts at Seoul National University in 1971, she moved to France to pursue further study in semiology, philosophy, and aesthetics. She began teaching in 1973 as a professor at the École Supérieure des Beaux-Arts in Marseille from 1974 until 2000, and then the Ecole Nationale Superieure d’Art, Dijon from 2001-2011.

Kim moves across different mediums, including video, drawing, painting, performance, installation, photography, sculpture, and calligraphy to create her work. Her expansive practice is conceptually-driven, leading her to use a wide range of mediums to explore ideas in philosophy, engage with political and social issues, and collaborate with a wide range of thinkers, artists, and performers. Kim's emphasis on openness and play dominate much of her work, allowing her to shift between and blend different references from different times and places, involve multiple participants in performances and installations, and explore the formal possibilities of both new and old mediums ranging from video to calligraphy.

The National Museum of Modern and Contemporary Art (MMCA) presented the first major retrospective of Kim's work in Korea from 2019-2020 that later traveled to the ZKM Center for Art and Media in Karlsruhe from 2022-3. The show title "Soungui Kim: Lazy Clouds" refers to the title of a poem Kim wrote, the name of the book of poetry she published in France, and a self-assigned nickname the artist has used since college. The title also hints at the positive connotations of laziness as a means of engaging in philosophical and creative play.

== Early life ==
Kim was born in 1946 in Buyeo, Chungnam, South Korea. She grew up in Daejeon, and then Seoul. Kim's mother was a well-known calligrapher and painter exhibiting work under the name Sang Man, and Kim's grandfather practiced calligraphy as well. As a result, Kim studied calligraphy since early childhood, and argues that practicing calligraphy has been essential to her practice. She was also exposed to photography and film at a young age due to her uncle who studied photography in Japan, and worked in the film industry.

Kim enjoyed drawing and painting as a child, with one elementary school teacher telling her that she could become an artist, and move to Paris, where she could meet artists from across the world. The idea that moving abroad could expose one to other cultures later propelled Kim in adulthood to move to France. In addition to drawing and calligraphy, Kim learned danso (Korean flute) at the National Gugak Center, and traditional archery at Hwanghakjeong. After graduating from high school, Kim continued taking danso lessons at the National Music Center. Archery and the colors related to it would appear in her work in the early 70s, such as Ten Thousand Ugly Ink Dots (1982).

== Education ==
Kim completed her undergraduate and graduate studies at the College of Fine Arts at Seoul National University from 1966-71. Her classmates included artist Sung Wankyung and architect Chung Guyon. While attending school, she studied French through language exchange with a French Catholic priest. She exhibited a piece titled Sori (1970) for her graduate school degree show. For the work, Kim hung up a ripped piece of cloth that she had submerged in paint on a piece of wood.

In 1971, the Centre Artistique de Rencontre International in Nice invited Kim, and awarded her a scholarship that allowed her to move to France at the age of 25 and study at the École Nationale d'Arts Décoratifs de Nice. Upon graduating she was selected for an exhibition featuring work by select graduates from art colleges in the area. The show was held at L'Institut d'Environnement. She then went on to study semiology, philosophy, and aesthetics at the Université d'Aix-en-Provence and the Université de Nice. While studying Shitao's ideas on paintings, and Eastern philosophy and aesthetics more broadly, Kim continued her artistic practice.

In 1974, she became a professor at the École Supérieure des Beaux-Arts in Marseille. She also taught at Ecole Nationale d’Art Décoratif, Nice from 1974-5, and Ecole Nationale Superieure d’Art, Dijon from 2001-2011. Scholar Jean-Michel Rabaté credits Kim with showing students in cities across France the potential of video art in unprecedented ways.

== Work ==
=== Process ===
Kim emphasizes the openness of her work, stating that words like "situation," "play," and "gesture" best describe her artistic practice.

Kim has used the word "situation" to explain her work since 1971 when she arrived in France. Unable to utilize an existing term common in art, and drawn to the word's implication of openness and contingency, she found herself drawing on it when asked to speak about her practice. She claims that the word was not taken from the Situationists of the 1960s, and distinguishes her work from them in both context and approach. By the end of the 70s, she was able to use the term "installation" to label her work.

Kim states that works like Stock Exchange (2005-ongoing) showing changing stock prices exemplify the fluctuation of movement in her work. In this particular work, Kim's emphasis on process and continued variation allows her to critically look at the rapid pace of change in a hyper-modern Asia.

=== Medium ===
Kim has worked across a wide-range of media, including video, drawing, painting, performance, installation, photography, sculpture, and calligraphy. She stated in a 2019 interview that she only chooses the medium for work after deciding the concept.

==== Video art ====
Kim created her first video work in 1971-3 titled Il-Ki (Journal) with an 8mm movie camera, and continued to create video works with an 8mm movie camera she purchased in 1973, or video cameras she borrowed. After meeting artists like John Cage and Nam June Paik in the late 70s, and purchasing a video camera in 1983, Kim shifted towards working primarily with video. From 1983 to 1984, she researched the medium at CIRCA, and later at Studio National Des Arts Contemporains (SNAC). Soon after, she often turned to and traveled with video cameras and homemade pinhole cameras (which she termed her "foolish camera") for her work.

==== Multimedia art ====
Kim's conception of multimedia art moves beyond medium-specificity and the limits that it might impose, and rather offers the artist a new way of interacting with the world:

"I don't see multimedia art as an artistic genre, rather a way of being, thinking, seeing and behaving. It's an open gesture, an indeterminate domain, a pluralistic manner of seeing, in other words a formless mode of approach based on a diversification of sites, prospects, languages and techniques. It's the 'movement of thought' or movement simple, its tracing. A Stroke of the Brush, the step. It ignores forms, distinctions, hierarchies yet has the capacity to change indefinitely and includes all domains and times simultaneously. This is why I like to call it 'Open media.'"

Kim's linkage between newer mediums like video with artistic practices with longer histories, such as calligraphy, both allows the artist to think of multimedia art expansively, and is a direct result of technological advances—the accessibility and portability of camcorders fundamentally changed how Kim created video art.

===== Vide&O (1989) =====
Vide&O is one example of her cross-medial work, offering a life-sized television made entirely of ice. The name of the sculpture was borne out of a misunderstanding with the employee at the ice factory who made the work, and wrote the words "empty water" instead of "video" on the piece ("vide eau," meaning "empty water," is pronounced the same as "vide" "O"). Kim liked the accidental name, and stuck with it given that the sculpture showed a video monitor that was empty.

==== Station 0 Time (1996-7) ====
The Korean National Center for Industrial Technology commissioned the multimedia work consisting of two components. The first was a multi-video projection that displayed a random combination of TV and satellite channel signals, and videos showing the day's weather and times across the world which were drawn from over 45,000 sources.

=== Participation and performance ===
A number of Kim's works involve participation from the public or invited artists and friends, keying into her desire to create open-ended works that move beyond the individual, and can take on different forms with multiple iterations. While documenting individual performances in the video Il-Ki (Journal) (1971-3), Kim expanded the scope of her performances with large-scale works like Situation Plastique II, and III (1971–73, 1973).

==== Situation Plastique II, III (1971-1973, 1973) ====
For Situation Plastique II (Cagnes sur Mer, October 1972; Nice, November, 1972; Grasse, July 1973; Monaco), Kim and the participants flew kites that the artist made with cloth from Korea while participants took turns shooting the group with a video camera. Situation Plastique III - Octobre à Bordeaux (1973) required over 300 art students in Bordeaux to help attach pieces of cloth and balloons to stones, and then sever the connections, allowing over 300 balloons to float away and disappear.

==== "Soungui Kim Art Festival" (1975) ====
Kim's solo exhibition at the U.S. Culture Center in Seoul titled "Soungui Kim Art Festival" was her first show in the U.S. since moving to France. The exhibition featured a series of programs, including screenings and open discussions on trends and practices in contemporary art—a format unusual for its time. The Korean Central Intelligence Agency (KCIA) confiscated her work Sori (1970) which she installed in an alley near the exhibition space. In addition to Sori, the show included works like Today (1975, 1998). However, the works included in the show are now all gone, and are available only through video and written documentation.

==== Today (1975, 1998) ====
Kim first conceived of the work in 1975, but considers each installation a new piece. The installation includes a drawn calendar on the exhibition wall covering the dates of the show. Each day of the exhibition, visitors are welcome to write in whichever language, script, and color they choose the words "yesterday," "today," and "tomorrow" under the current date. The peculiarity of Kim's calendar renders every day "yesterday," "today," and "tomorrow," thus destabilizing our notions around time, and illustrating how the passage of time is tied to both lived experience and language.

==== Space Time (1975, 2008, 2019) ====
Kim created a performance for the festival celebrating the 100th issue of the Korean magazine Space. For the 1975 of this performance, she recorded the movements of participating performers with drawings. The 2008 version at Art Sonje Center featured a Buddhist priest, curator, and cellist, and the 2019 iteration at the National Museum for Modern and Contemporary Art (MMCA) centered on Kim, a robot named Younghee, and shaman Kim Mihwa.

=== Interest in social, political, and economic issues ===
Kim's interest in form and modes of engagement with art do not preclude directly addressing political, social, and economic issues. Works like Stock Exchange (2005-ongoing) and Lottery Neighborhood (1999) consider issues around the market and labor, while iterations of Colpoteurs (1991-ongoing) consider issues ranging from the Gulf War and French governmental policies, and Sans nom (Without Name) (1995) centers on Korean "comfort women."

=== Engagement with philosophy ===
Kim's wide array of references to thinkers across time and the world reveals a deep investment in the connections between art and other fields. She draws heavily from philosophy, citing figures like Guy Debord and Zhuangzi, utilizing terms from Buddhism and Daoism, and engaging in dialogue with Jacques Derrida and Jean-Luc Nancy. Kim blends philosophy and artistic practice together in her description of painting, bringing in references to the origins of Chinese writing, Shitao, Vattimo, and Wittgenstein.

Kim's interest in the philosophical aspects of art extends to her conceptions of medium forms as well. When discussing her work "Dream of Butterfly (Songe d’un papillon)" (1992) centered on the funeral for a Buddhist monk, Kim compares video as a medium to the Daoist and Buddhist concept of "emptiness":

"Video is nothing but a 'shining empty vessel,' a 'vessel to fold time'; video is nothing but timing and energy. Video is X time of the frequency of an electron; one video image is composed of one twenty-fifth of second. Video is pure movement of timing and the life itself is nothing but how to use everyday time. Therefore video is life, use of time." Kim's linkage of video and the temporality of the living world offers an expansive understanding of the medium that moves beyond its technological functions.

=== Interaction with and influences from other artists ===
Kim first heard about Fluxus through artist Ben Vautier, who lived in her neighborhood in France, and she became familiar with the artists' work through the head of Ecole de Nice Jacques Lepage. Kim first met John Cage in 1978 at the John Cage Festival in Sainte Baume, France, where he asked her to perform 0',00". She then met Nam June Paik in 1979 through Cage. Kim received at research grant in 1982 from the Cultural Ministry of France to stay in New York and work on a project titled "Multimedia and Namjune Paik." She photographed, taped, and wrote about Paik's preparation for his solo show at the Whitney Museum of Art. While in New York, Kim became acquainted with figures associated with The Kitchen, and artists like Ko Nakajima, Frank Gillette, John Sanborn, and Ira Schneider.

Kim collaborated with both artists for video works titled Bonjour Nam-June-Paik (1984) and John Cage: Empty Words (1986).

==== Bonjour Nam-June-Paik II (1984) ====
For the joint performance, Kim wrote poetry on silk with the pattern of TV color bars.

John Cage: Empty Words and Mirage Verbal (1986)

Cage used text from Marcel Duchamp's journals to perform on the day of Kim's birthday at a festival she organized at La Vielle Charite with the Association of the Mediterranean Institute of Research and Creation (IMEREC). The festival titled "Video and Multimedia: Soungui Kim and Her Invitees" included John Cage, Nam June Paik, Ko Nakajima, Daniel Charles, Ira Schneider, and Davison Gigliotti.

==== Influences from dance and poetry ====
Kim has also discussed the work of dancers, and poets like Merce Cunningham, Yvonne Rainer, Steve Paxton, and Tao Yuanming.

== Critical reception ==
For the first few decades of her career, Kim was largely unknown in the Korean art world, exhibiting primarily outside of Korea. In 1995, the National Museum of Modern and Contemporary Art (MMCA) tried to work with Kim to take part in the exhibition for their "Artist of the Year" program, but the project fell through during negotiations. While Kim exhibited in other venues in Korea, Korean audiences had little exposure to the broad scope of her oeuvre until the 2019-2020 solo exhibition "Soungui Kim: Lazy Clouds" at MMCA.

Art critic Hye-jin Mun describes a consistency in Kim's oeuvre exemplified by the key words" play, process, situation, the everyday, coincidence, non/sense, inaction, loss of self, and paradox. But Mun also notes the difficulty of categorizing and broadly contextualizing Kim's work given her uniqueness in relation to the Korean and French art scenes.

== Select exhibitions ==
=== Solo exhibitions ===
- "Soun Gui Kim" (American Cultural Center, Seoul, 1975)
- "Soun Gui Kim" (Gallery Kyeon-Ji, Seoul, 1977)
- "Ten thousand ugly ink dots" (Galerie DAAD, Berlin, 1985)
- "Soun Gui Kim" (Galerie Donguy, Paris, 1988)
- "Passages" (Centre d’Art Contemporain, Troyes, France, 1989)
- "0 Time" (Musée d’Art Moderne et d’Art Contemporain de Nice, Nice, 1991)
- "Station 0 Time" (Korean Institute of Industrial Technology, Cheonan, Korea, 1996)
- "Stock Exchange I" (La Maison du Livre d’Artiste Contemporain, Domart en Ponthieu, 1999)
- "Stock Exchange II" (Art Sonje Center, Seoul, 2001)
- "P.A.P." (Galerie Lara Vincy, Paris, 2001)
- "Stock Exchange III" (La Maison de l’Art et de la Communication de Sallaumine, Sallaumine, 2001)
- "Points de vue" (Galerie de/di/dY, Paris, 2005)
- "Soun Gui Kim/Films" (The Film Gallery, Paris, 2006)
- "Soun-Gui Kim" (Platform Seoul, Gallery Ye Mec, Seoul, 2008)
- "Stock+Garden," (Gallery 175, Seoul, 2008)
- "Beating the market: Soun-Gui Kim in dialogue with Cage, Derrida, and Nancy" (Slought Foundation, Philadelphia, 2013)
- "Lunes, Où, Par-dessus le marché, Silence" (Art Sonje Center, Seoul, 2014)
- "Kim Soun-gui: 0 Time" (Arario Gallery, Seoul, 2018)
- "Soun-Gui Kim: Lazy Clouds" (National Museum of Modern and Contemporary Art (MMCA), Seoul, 2019-2020; ZKM Center for Art and Media, Karlsruhe, 2022-2023)

=== Group exhibitions ===
- "Contemporary art festival, Space 75" (National Theater of Myeongdong, Seoul, 1975)
- "Rencontre Internationale de la Photographie" (Arles, 1995)
- "Gwangju Biennale PAUSE" (Gwangju, Korea, 2002)
- "Past in reverse" (Kemper Museum of Contemporary Art, Kansas; Hood Museum, Depaul University, Indiana; Dartmouth College, New Hampshire; Hanover Peeler Art Center, Hanover, 2005)
- "Media City Seoul 2010" (Seoul History Museum, Seoul, 2010)
- "Asian Film & Video Art Forum" (MMCA, Seoul, 2015)
- "Is it morning for you yet: The 58th Carnegie International" (Carnegie Museum of Art, Pittsburgh, 2022)
