= Lucas van Uffelen =

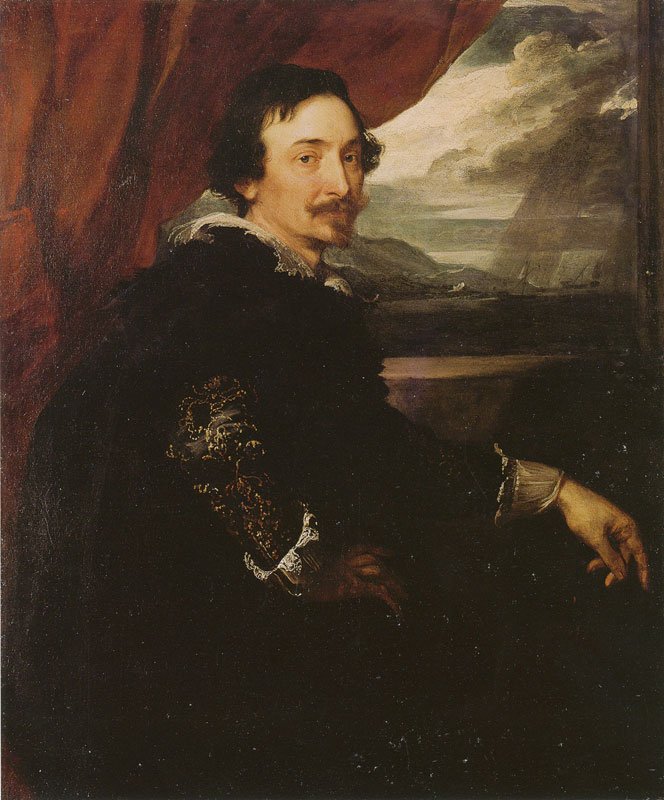
- Portrait by Anthony van Dyck
- Born: 1586; Amsterdam
- Died: 1637 (aged 50–51); Amsterdam

Lucas van Uffelen or Uffel (1586 – 1637) was a highly wealthy Dutch merchant, shipowner, mecenat and influential art collector based in Amsterdam and Venice.

Uffelen was born in Amsterdam. He moved to Venice where he assembled a significant and celebrated art collection, which included paintings by Titian, Rubens, Rembrandt, Ribera, Reni and Guercino as well as Van Dyck, and Raphael’s Portrait of Baldassare Castiglione. He returned to Amsterdam in 1630 and continued to collect art. Lukas had his portrait painted by Anthony van Dyck twice, once in 1622 and later in the fashionable "action" style of getting up from one's chair. He appears to be getting up to greet the viewer after studying the objects of his collection.

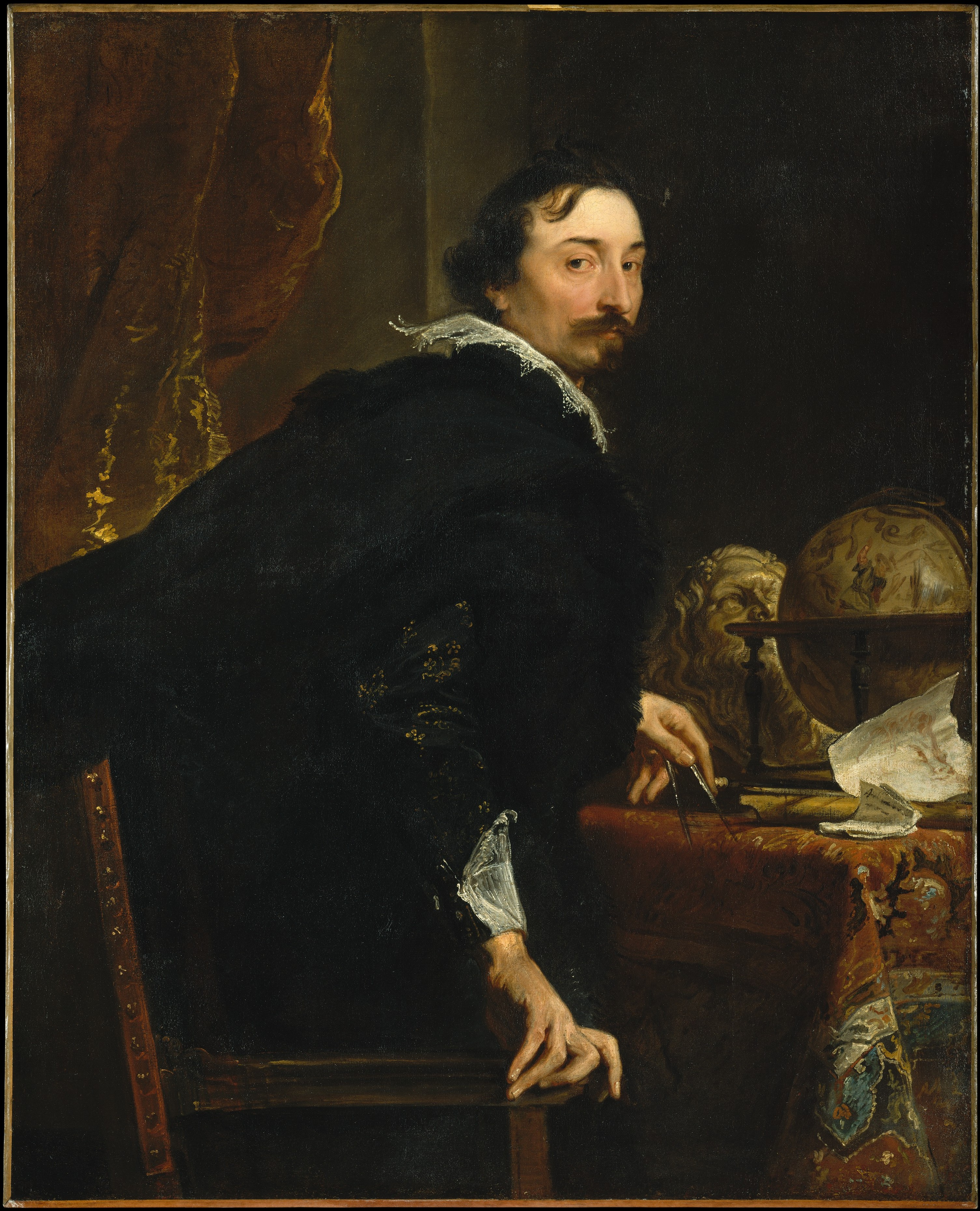
Second portrait by Anthony van Dyck

When Lucas Van Uffelen died, his art collection went under the hammer at a public auction in Amsterdam on April 9, 1639. The event attracted the artists and collectors of the era. Among those present were Rembrandt Van Rijn and Joachim Von Sandrart. Rembrandt was so inspired by Raphael's Portrait of Baldassare Castiglione that he made a quick sketch of it in his notebook and noted the final sale price. The person who ultimately won the bidding war and purchased the portrait for the sum of 3,500 guilders was Alfonso López. Many of the other Italian paintings were purchased by the Reynst Collection.

López was a prominent Portuguese merchant, diplomat and patron of the arts born into a moorish and/or jewish family. His immense wealth and political value shielded him from the Inquisition. His collection was open to viewing in Amsterdam and deeply influenced Rembrandt. Rembrandt lived in the Jodenbuurt, Amsterdam's Jewish district—on the same street as Vermeer's father, Reynier Jansz Vos, when Reynier worked as an apprentice silk weaver.

Lukas van Uffelen and his family operated within the global trade networks where Marranos (hidden persecuted-Jews from Spain and Portugal) played a crucial economic och cultural role. Lucas was related to Van Dyck through the Cuypers family. Hans van Uffelen, Lukas father was a registered historical printmaker, painter, and copyist active in Amsterdam during the early 17th century (approx. 1601–1613). Hans, also a shipping agent and merchant, traveled to Bahia, Brazil, (between 1598 and 1601). Hans made illustrations of exotic plants and animals, including the papaya and the tarantula, which were specimens previously unknown in Europe.

Hans black-and-white etching, depicting himself and his wife Agneta van Liesvelt, is preserved in the collections of the Rijksmuseum Amsterdam. Following the Spanish Fury in Antwerp (1576) the couple relocated to Amsterdam. The left side depicts Agneta. She came from a family of well-known printers, including Jacob van Liesvelt who was executed in 1545. Her side of the portrait features her family's coat of arms depicting an open book with a kneeling figure and an executioner holding a raised sword. The right side depicts Hans van Uffelen with his family coat of arms.

== Notable works from his collection ==
- Portrait of Andrea Odoni
- A Man with a Quilted Sleeve
- Portrait of Baldassare Castiglione
