= Saskia Van Uffelen =

Belgian business woman, active in the ICT field

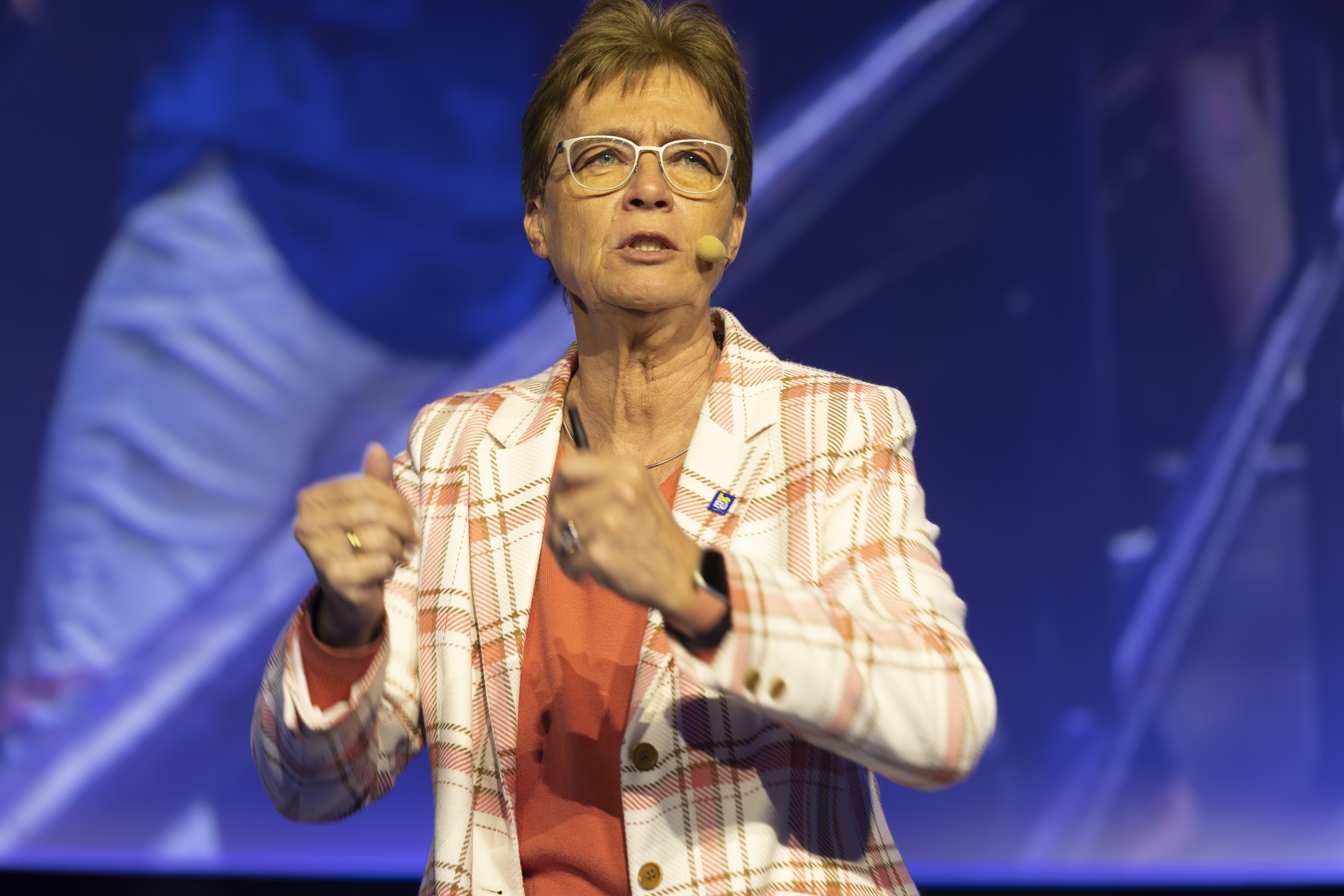
- Van Uffelen in 2024
- Citizenship: Belgian
- Occupation: Business executive
- Notable work: Iedereen baas! (2014)
- Title: CEO of Ericsson Belux (2014–2018); CEO of Bull & CSB Consulting (2008–2014)
- Awards: Hogenheuvel college member (2010)

Saskia Van Uffelen is a Belgian business woman, active in the ICT field, and involved in activities related to the skills impact of digital transformation.

== Biography ==
She started her career in the IT sector in 1984, held several roles in IT companies (Xerox, Compaq, HP and Arinso), became CEO of Bull & CSB Consulting in 2008, and was CEO of Ericsson Belux between 2014 and 2018.

She holds positions on the board of Belgian postal company bpost SA, High voltage company Elia System Operator SA, Elia Asset SA, and insurance company AXA.

Her public interventions, (e.g. TEDx events) focus on embracing the digital and organisational change whilst putting the human factor in the centre.

In 2012, as part of the European DigitalChampions initiative, Belgium nominated her to be part of the Digital Champion expert Group. Her focus is on improving ICT skills.

In 2014 she started the coordination of the Belgian coalition on digital skills and jobs, part of the European coalition on digital skills and jobs and launched the official Federal Belgian initiative digitalchampion.be.

In 2017 she became part of the European Digital Skills and Jobs Coalition Governing Board, overseeing the national coalitions on digital skills.

She became member of the Digital minds for Belgium, an informal advisory body of the Belgian Government related to digital initiatives.

In 2017 she became co-founder of Becentral, an initiative aimed at digital transformation of the Belgian society.

== Awards ==
- Member of Hogenheuvel college, 2010, honorary distinction towards enterprise people from the university KULeuven
- ICT Women of the year by Datanews in 2011.
- The association Flanders-Europa awarded her the medal for economic achievement in 2016.

== Author ==
She published the management book "Iedereen baas" (in Dutch language) or "Tous patron" about the fact that 4 generations (generation X, generation Y, generation Z babyboomers) of employees have to work together on the workfloor.

She is also co-author of the book "social technologies in business: connect share, lead" on how social technologies are transforming organisations.
