= Marie Ekeland =

French entrepreneur (born 1975)

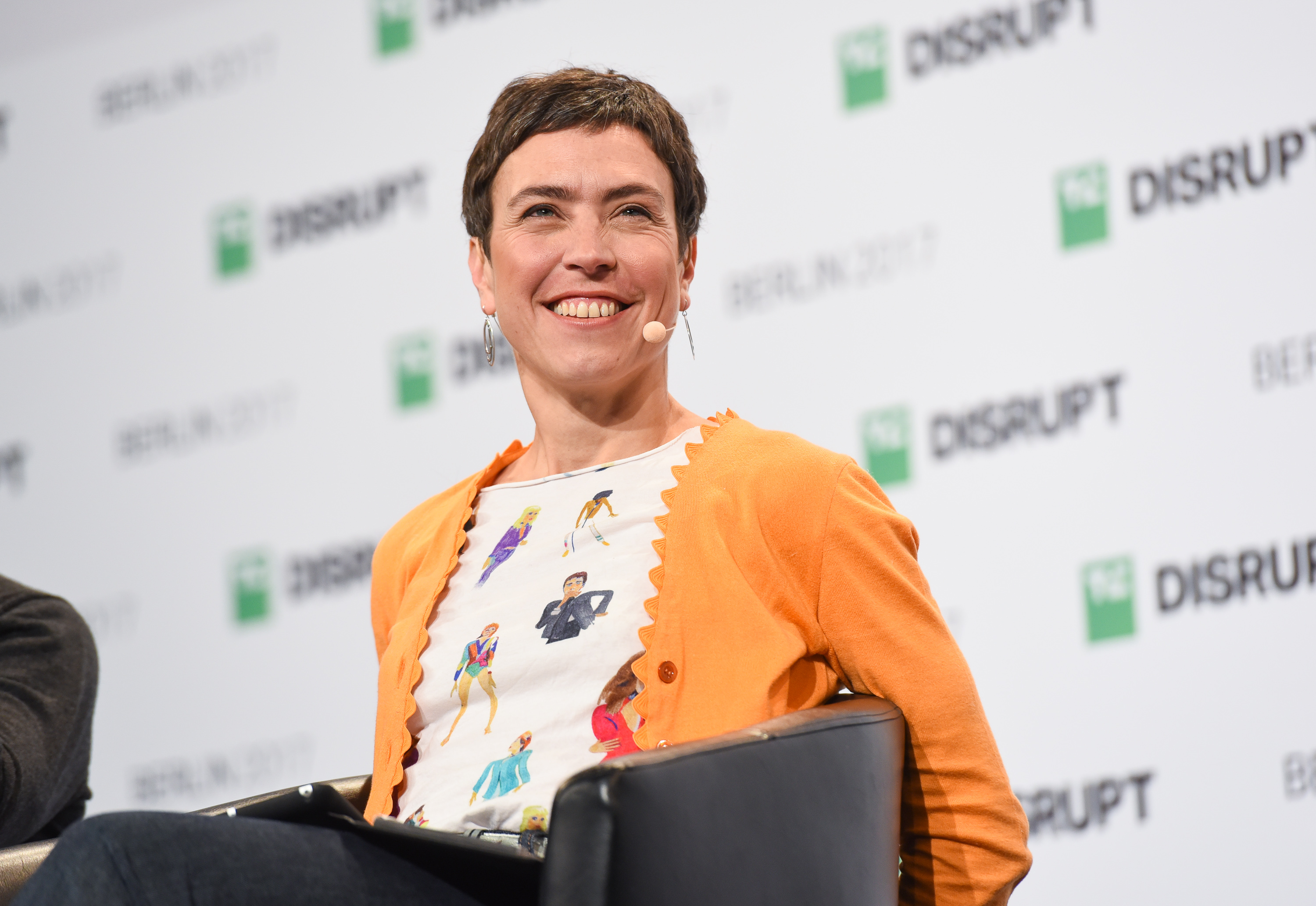
- Born: 15 August 1975 (age 50); Paris
- Education: Université Paris-Dauphine École d'économie de Paris
- Occupation: Venture Capitalist
- Father: Ivar Ekeland
- Honours: Chevalier de l'ordre national du Mérite (2014) Inspiring Fifty France (d) (2016) Chevalier de la Légion d'honneur (2021)
- Website: https://2050.do/team/marieekeland/

Marie Ekeland (born 13 August 1975 in Paris), is a French entrepreneur specializing in start-up financing. She is the co-founder of the Daphni investment fund and the founder and president of the 2050 fund.

At the end of 2017, she became the first woman president of the Conseil national du numérique (French Digital Council, abbreviated CNNum or less commonly CNN), an independent advisory commission created by a French presidential decree to advise the French government on any question relating to the impact of digital technologies on economy and society.

She is also the co-founder of France Digitale, an association to represent the French tech ecosystem. In 2021, she received the chevalier de la Légion d'honneur, the highest French order of merit.

== Early life and education ==
Daughter of the mathematician Ivar Ekeland and his wife Catherine, Marie Ekeland first studied mathematics and computer science at Paris-Dauphine University. After completing her studies at the age of 22, she joined the investment bank JPMorgan Chase in New York as a computer scientist.

Returning to Paris in 1998, she decided to take a sabbatical year to complete her studies by completing a master's degree in “Economic Analysis and Policy” at the School of Advanced Studies in Social Sciences.

== Career ==
From 2000, Marie Ekeland worked at the venture capital arm of Crédit Agricole Private Equity. There she met Xavier Lazarus, who in 2005 suggested that she join forces with Elaia Partners, his venture capital fund specializing in the digital economy founded three years earlier. At Elaia, Ekeland managed some of the firm's successful investments over the years, including the investment in Criteo, a French advertising retargeting start-up which listed on the NASDAQ in 2013.

In 2012, Marie Ekeland co-founded France Digitale, an organization with the aim to create an ecosystem for entrepreneurs and investors and to promote the digital economy.

In 2015, she left Elaia Partners to start her own venture capital firm, Daphni, an investment fund specializing in the digital economy. She describes this investment fund as a new type of venture capital company, based on the platform economy. After a few months, the investment fund raised 150 million euros from investors such as Fnac Darty, Nokia and Société Générale.

She left Daphni in 2019 to direct her focus as an investor on problems like climate change and social inequity. However, she remained on Daphni's financing committee overseeing investments of the firm's first fund, which include Shine, Swile, Holberton School and Lifen.

In November 2020, Marie Ekeland launched a new investment fund called 2050. Rather than following the typical venture capital structure, the fund is a 'fonds de pérennité,' an evergreen fund that allows for mission-driven long-term investments in areas such as the future of food, better healthcare, improving education, shaping a sustainable lifestyle and fostering trust in the media and financial institutions.

== Awards and honors ==
- 2021, Légion d'honneur

== Works ==
- Benoît Thieulin, Yann Bonnet, Somalina Pa, Daniel Kaplan, Marie Ekeland, Valérie Peugeot, Stéphane Distinguin, Marc Tessier (2015): Ambition numérique : pour une politique française et européenne de la transition numérique
