= French people in Korea =

Total population
- 11,346 (2024)

Regions with significant populations
- Seoul

Languages
- French, Korean

Religion
- Catholicism

Related ethnic groups
- French people

There is a community of French people in Korea.

== History ==
French people began coming to Korea as early as the seventeenth century, when French Catholic missionaries first came to the country. However, most missionaries came after the 1886 establishment of relations between France and the Joseon dynasty; the treaty signed between the two countries gave French missionaries the right to evangelise in Korea.

== Distribution ==
There were an estimated 5,343 French nationals in South Korea as of 2016. Most are employed by French multinationals operating in the country. The largest concentration can be found in the Seorae Village in Seoul's Seocho-gu district, which because of its location on a hill is often compared to Montmartre in Paris. Korea's only school using French as the medium of instruction moved there in 1984. Most French children only attend elementary or middle school in Seoul, but then return to France afterwards.

In September 2009, the Seoul metropolitan government announced a five billion-won plan to renovate the area and make it more attractive to foreign residents by widening pedestrian walkways and putting up more signs in French. One portion of the pavement, starting from the entrance to Bangbae Middle School, is painted in red, white and blue, the colours of the flag of France.

== Notable people ==
- Julien Kang, South Korean actor
- Siméon-François Berneux, Catholic missionary
- Victor Collin de Plancy, French diplomat
- Ida Daussy, TV celebrity
- Fabien Yves Jerome Corbineau, model and TV celebrity
- Robin Deiana, model and TV celebrity

== See also ==
- Koreans in France
- French campaign against Korea
