= 2024 French legislative election in Alpes-de-Haute-Provence =

Following the first round of the 2024 French legislative election on 30 June 2024, runoff elections in each constituency where no candidate received a vote share greater than 50 percent were scheduled for 7 July. Candidates permitted to stand in the runoff elections needed to either come in first or second place in the first round or achieve more than 12.5 percent of the votes of the entire electorate (as opposed to 12.5 percent of the vote share due to low turnout).

== Alpes-de-Haute-Provence ==
=== 1st constituency ===
Candidate	Party or alliance		First round		Second round	
Candidate	Party or alliance		Votes	%	Votes	%
Christian Girard	National Rally		18,616	44.30	21,533	54.19
Felix Blanc	New Popular Front	The Ecologists	11,457	27.26	18,206	45.81
Benoit Gauvan	Ensemble	Renaissance	8,132	19.35		
Sandra Raponi	The Republicans		2,956	7.03		
Patricia Campart	Reconquête		468	1.11		
Annabel Ros	Far-left	Lutte Ouvrière	396	0.94		
Nadia Lakhlef Tsalamlal	Union of Democrats and Independents (Note: Dissident not endorsed by Ensemble)		1	0.00		
Total			42,026	100.00	39,739	100.00
Valid votes			42,026	97.10	39,739	91.33
Invalid votes			382	0.88	970	2.23
Blank votes			871	2.01	2,801	6.44
Total votes			43,279	100.00	43,510	100.00
Registered voters/turnout			61,473	70.40	61,472	70.78

=== 2nd constituency ===
Candidate	Party or alliance		First round		Second round	
Candidate	Party or alliance		Votes	%	Votes	%
Sophie Vaginay	Union of the far right	National Rally	18,314	40.89	21,655	50.97
Léo Walter	New Popular Front	La France Insoumise	14,774	32.99	20,834	49.03
Dominique Blanc	Ensemble	Renaissance	10,162	22.69		
Myriam Cadenel	Reconquête		585	1.31		
Loan Reynaud	Miscellaneous right	Independent	512	1.14		
Henri Cyvoct	Far-left	Lutte Ouvrière	438	0.98		
Total			44,785	100.00	42,489	100.00
Valid votes			44,785	96.19	42,489	90.65
Invalid votes			480	1.03	968	2.07
Blank votes			1,295	2.78	3,412	7.28
Total votes			46,560	100.00	46,869	100.00
Registered voters/turnout			66,671	69.84	66,674	70.30
