= 2024 French legislative election in Ardèche =

Following the first round of the 2024 French legislative election on 30 June 2024, runoff elections in each constituency where no candidate received a vote share greater than 50 percent were scheduled for 7 July. Candidates permitted to stand in the runoff elections needed to either come in first or second place in the first round or achieve more than 12.5 percent of the votes of the entire electorate (as opposed to 12.5 percent of the vote share due to low turnout).

== Ardèche ==
=== 1st constituency ===
Candidate	Party or alliance		First round		Second round	
Candidate	Party or alliance		Votes	%	Votes	%
Céline Porquet	National Rally		21,736	39.95	25,419	47.32
Hervé Saulignac	New Popular Front	Socialist Party	20,809	38.24	28,303	52.68
Séverine Gineys	Ensemble	Democratic Movement	6,651	12.22		
Marie-Pierre Chaix	The Republicans		3,067	5.64		
Thierry Dorne	Sovereigntist right	Debout la France	651	1.20		
Muriel Vander Donckt	Far-left	Lutte Ouvrière	518	0.95		
Maryse Leclerc	Reconquête		506	0.93		
Pascal Chambonnet	Far-left	Independent Workers' Party	474	0.87		
Total			54,412	100.00	53,722	100.00
Valid votes			54,412	97.18	53,722	94.34
Invalid votes			507	0.91	918	1.61
Blank votes			1,072	1.91	2,308	4.05
Total votes			55,991	100.00	56,948	100.00
Registered voters/turnout			79,596	70.34	79,596	71.55

=== 2nd constituency ===
Candidate	Party or alliance		First round		Second round	
Candidate	Party or alliance		Votes	%	Votes	%
Vincent Trebuchet	Union of the far right	The Republicans	24,417	35.75	33,926	52.76
Michelle Victory	New Popular Front	Socialist Party	17,051	24.97	30,372	47.24
Laurence Heydel Grillere	Ensemble	Renaissance	11,904	17.43		
Jean-Paul Vallon	Miscellaneous right	Independent	10,509	15.39		
Rémy Nodin	Independent		2,197	3.22		
Gérard Montreynaud	Reconquête		777	1.14		
Jacky Ritz	Sovereigntist right	Debout la France	613	0.90		
Michelle Gaillard	Far-left	Lutte Ouvrière	609	0.89		
Gérard Julien	Independent		213	0.31		
Total			68,290	100.00	64,298	100.00
Valid votes			68,290	97.00	64,298	91.03
Invalid votes			694	0.99	1,464	2.07
Blank votes			1,420	2.02	4,868	6.89
Total votes			70,404	100.00	70,630	100.00
Registered voters/turnout			97,138	72.48	97,151	72.70

=== 3rd constituency ===
Candidate	Party or alliance		First round		Second round	
Candidate	Party or alliance		Votes	%	Votes	%
Cyrile Grangier	National Rally		18,328	31.95	20,379	34.59
Florence Pallot	New Popular Front	La France Insoumise	16,239	28.31	18,125	30.76
Fabrice Brun	Miscellaneous right	Independent (Note: Brun left The Republicans in 2023, but ran as a Miscellaneous Right Independent supporting his former party)	15,194	26.48	20,414	34.65
Quentin Bonnetain	Ensemble	Renaissance	5,984	10.43		
Christophe Marchisio	Far-left	Lutte Ouvrière	482	0.84		
James Marcesse	Reconquête		479	0.83		
Laurent Touzet	Regionalists	Résistons !	331	0.58		
Alexandre Faure	Far-left	Independent	327	0.57		
Félix Zaguedoun-Reynaud	Independent		7	0.01		
Total			57,371	100.00	58,918	100.00
Valid votes			57,371	97.76	58,918	98.13
Invalid votes			471	0.80	335	0.56
Blank votes			845	1.44	789	1.31
Total votes			58,687	100.00	60,042	100.00
Registered voters/turnout			81,022	72.43	81,011	74.12
