= Saur Neptun Gdańsk =

Polish water supply company

Saur Neptun Gdańsk S.A.
- Type: Spółka Akcyjna
- Industry: Water supply company and sanitation
- Founded: 10 December 1991; 34 years ago
- Headquarters: ul. Wałowa 46 80-858 Gdańsk
- Key people: President: Jacek Kieloch; Vice-President: Magdalena Markiewicz
- Revenue: PLN 50 million
- Owner: Saur (51%); Gdańsk Miasto (49%)
- Number of employees: 700
- Parent: Saur
- Website: sng.com.pl

Saur Neptun Gdańsk often abbreviated as SNG is a Polish water supply company which operates in Gdańsk and Sopot. The company serves 550,000 inhabitants, and supplies 27 million cubic meters of water and processes 35 million cubic meters of waste water each year.

== History ==
SNG was created in 1991 after the French company, Saur, had a successful bid to run the city of Gdańsk's water on a 30-year contract. Saur initially invested PLN 10 million into the infrastructure for SNG in Gdańsk. In September 2021, 3 months before the 30 year contract came to an end, the city of Gdańsk announced that the contract would not be renewed and that the city wanted to take control of the company, turning it into a municipal company. The contract with Saur was extended until a deal was reached for the buyout, which was announced in April 2022, costing the city PLN 45 million to buy the shares from Saur. The transfer of the shares would be complete on 1 January 2023, saving the city a reported PLN 76 million through buying the shares than creating a new company or working with a different company.

== Sport ==
SNG sponsored Lechia Gdańsk as the sole main sponsor for the 2006-07 season, and joint main sponsors with Energa SA from 2007-10. In 2013 RC Lechia Gdańsk and RC Arka Gdynia held their derby match at the Stadion Energa Gdańsk for the first time on the occasion of SNG's 20th anniversary.
