= Union of the Far-Right =

Electoral label in French politics

The Union of the Far-Right (French: Union de l'extrême droite, UXD) was a political and electoral descriptor created by the French Ministry of the Interior for the 2024 legislative election to denote candidates from The Republicans (LR) party that were supported and endorsed by the National Rally (RN). Le Monde classified these investitures as joint LR–RN candidacies. Following the second round of the election, a total of seventeen Union of the Far-Right candidates were elected to the National Assembly.

== History ==
Following the 2024 European election results, President Emmanuel Macron announced the dissolution of the National Assembly. The first round of snap elections took place on 30 June 2024, while the second round took place on 7 July 2024. On 11 June 2024, in response to the announcement, Éric Ciotti, leader of The Republicans (LR), suggested that the LR form a political and electoral alliance with the National Rally (RN) and run joint candidates at the upcoming elections. Marine Le Pen, leader of the RN group in the National Assembly, described Ciotti’s announcement as a "brave choice". His response was heavily criticized within LR itself, which led to executives of the party ousting him as leader, causing a crisis within The Republicans. The votes expelling him from party leadership and from the party altogether were overturned on 14 June.

Ciotti subsequently entered into negotiations with the RN, announcing on 17 June 2024 that an agreement had been reached for the RN to support and field no opposition to 62 Ciotti-allied LR candidates in the election. He later denounced the classification of his 63 candidates as the "Union of the Far-Right" by the Ministry of the Interior as a "low manoeuvre by the Macronists aimed at destabilizing our candidates and our voters", calling it "a democratic scandal of unprecedented gravity".

On 9 July 2024, Ciotti announced the formation of the On the Right group in the National Assembly, gathering 16 of the 17 candidates he put forward for the elections.

== Elected candidates ==
- Alexandre Allegret-Pilot, Gard's 5th constituency
- Charles Alloncle, Hérault's 9th constituency
- Brigitte Barèges, Tarn-et-Garonne's 1st constituency
- Matthieu Bloch, Doubs's 3rd constituency
- Bernard Chaix, Alpes-Maritimes's 3rd constituency
- Marc Chavent, Ain's 5th constituency
- Éric Ciotti, Alpes-Maritimes's 1st constituency
- Christelle d'Intorni, Alpes-Maritimes's 5th constituency
- Olivier Fayssat, Bouches-du-Rhône's 6th constituency
- Bartolomé Lenoir, Creuse's constituency
- Hanane Mansouri, Isère's 8th constituency
- Maxime Michelet, Marne's 3rd constituency
- Éric Michoux, Saône-et-Loire's 4th constituency
- Sophie-Laurence Roy, Yonne's 2nd constituency
- Vincent Trébuchet, Ardèche's 2nd constituency
- Sophie Vaginay-Ricourt, Alpes-de-Haute-Provence's 2nd constituency
- Gérault Verny, Bouches-du-Rhône's 14th constituency

== See also ==
- Union of the Right for the Republic
- UDR group
- National Republican Movement
