= Olivier Dussopt =

French politician (born 1978)

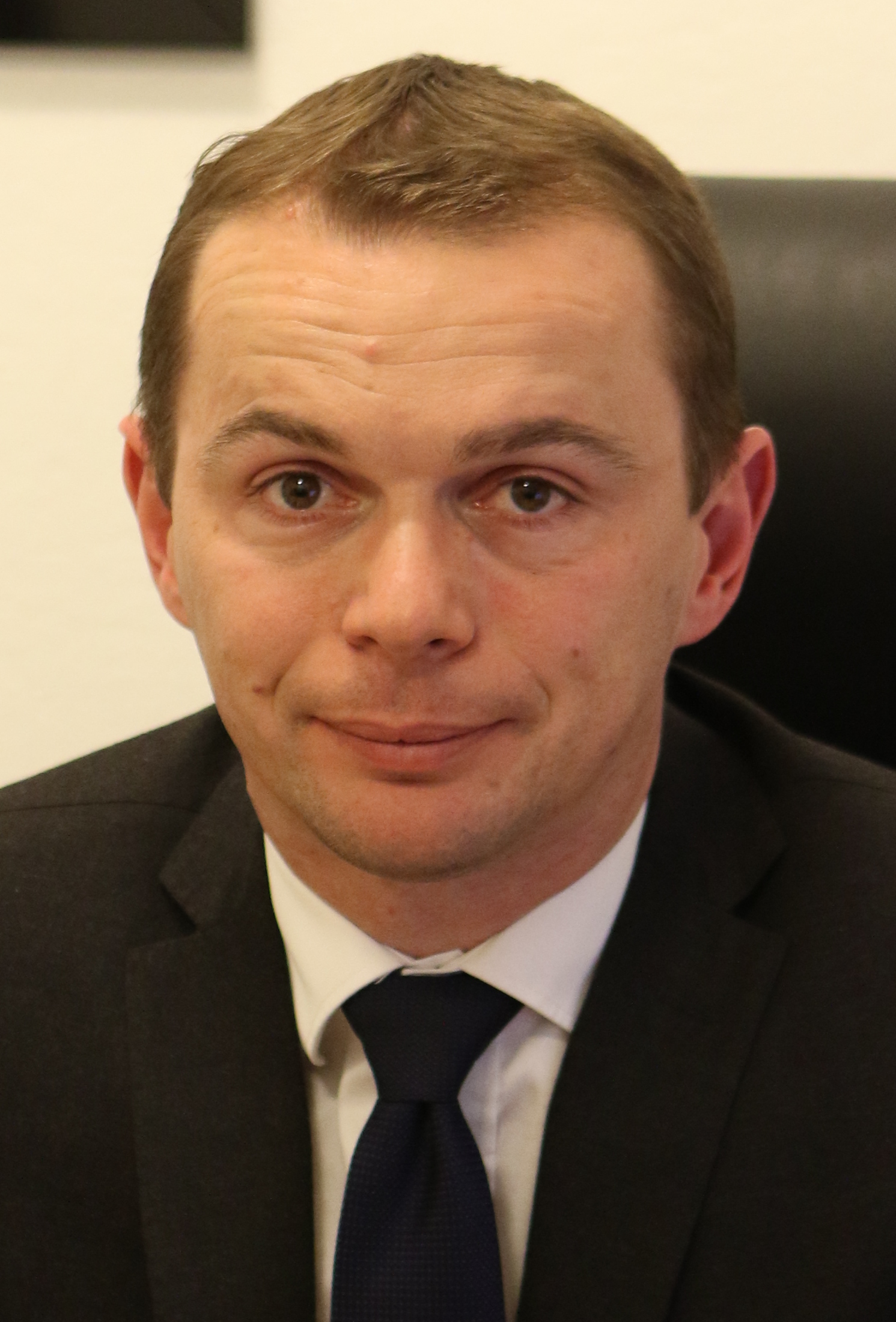
- Dussopt in 2017

Minister of Labour, Employment and Economic Inclusion
- In office 20 May 2022 – 11 January 2024
- Prime Minister: Élisabeth Borne
- Preceded by: Élisabeth Borne
- Succeeded by: Catherine Vautrin

Minister of Public Action and Accounts
- In office 24 November 2017 – 20 May 2022
- Prime Minister: Édouard Philippe; Jean Castex
- Preceded by: Gérald Darmanin
- Succeeded by: Gabriel Attal

Member of the National Assembly for Ardèche's 2nd constituency
- In office 12 February 2024 – 9 June 2024
- Preceded by: Laurence Heydel Grillere
- Succeeded by: Vincent Trébuchet
- In office 22 June 2022 – 22 July 2022
- Preceded by: Michèle Victory
- Succeeded by: Laurence Heydel Grillere
- In office 20 June 2007 – 24 December 2017
- Preceded by: Gérard Weber
- Succeeded by: Michèle Victory

Mayor of Annonay
- In office 16 March 2008 – 10 July 2017
- Preceded by: Gérard Weber
- Succeeded by: Antoinette Scherer

Member of the Regional Council of Rhône-Alpes
- In office 10 July 2006 – 17 March 2008

Personal details
- Born: 16 August 1978 (age 48) Annonay, France
- Party: Renaissance (2022–present)
- Other political affiliations: Socialist Party (2000–2017); Independent (2017–2020); Territories of Progress (2020–2022)
- Education: Grenoble Institute of Political Studies

Olivier Dussopt (French pronunciation: [ɔlivje dysɔpt]; born 16 August 1978) is a French politician who served as minister of labour, employment and integration in the government of prime minister Élisabeth Borne from 2022 to 2024. He previously served as minister of public action and accounts in the governments of successive prime ministers Édouard Philippe and Jean Castex from 2019 to 2022. Dussopt was a member of the National Assembly for Ardèche from 2007 to 2017, and again in 2022 and 2024.

== Career ==
Dussopt was a member of the Socialist Party from 2000 to 2017. From 2007 until 2017, he was a member of the National Assembly. In parliament, he served on the Committee on Economic Affairs (2007–2009) and the Committee on Legal Affairs (2009–2017).

In addition to his parliamentary activities, Dussopt worked on Manuel Valls’ campaign team in the Socialist Party's primaries for the 2017 presidential election. Following the 2017 French legislative election, he was among a minority that voted against the Philippe government's proposal for the 2018 national budget.

On 27 November 2017, Dussopt was appointed by President Macron to the position of Secretary of State to the Ministry of Public Action and Accounts, under the leadership of minister Gérald Darmanin. Soon after that, he was expelled from the Socialist Party. On 24 December 2017 he resigned from the National Assembly.

In 2020, he created the new movement Territories of Progress with fellow minister Jean-Yves Le Drian.

== Controversy ==
On 20 May 2020, French online investigative and opinion newspaper Mediapart revealed that the French utility company Saur gave him a present of lithographs by Gérard Garouste for a value of 2,000 euros in January 2017, just a few days before he announced a contract for a hydroelectric turbine with the same company in his town of Annonay.

After the revelations, he initially answered that it was "A gift from a friend", but later he recognized that it was a gift from the company, and he promised to give back the lithographs. Additionally, the Saur employee who gave him the gift declared that he was not a friend of Dussopt, but that Dussopt was just a client.

== Private life ==
In March 2023, Dussopt outed himself as a gay man in an interview with French magazine Têtu.
