= Philippe-Armand Martin =

French politician (1949–2023)

Member of the National Assembly for Marne's 3rd constituency
- In office 20 June 2012 – 20 June 2017
- Preceded by: Jean-Claude Thomas
- Succeeded by: Éric Girardin

Personal details
- Born: Philippe Armand Martin; 28 April 1949; Cumières, France
- Died: 5 November 2023 (aged 74); Damery, Marne, France
- Political party: UMP

Philippe-Armand Martin (28 April 1949 – 5 November 2023) was a French politician who was a member of the National Assembly. He represented the Marne department, and was a member of the Union for a Popular Movement. Martin died on 5 November 2023, at the age of 74.
