= Ministry of Public Action and Accounts =

Government ministry of France

Minister of Action and Public Accounts
- Ministre de l'Action et des Comptes publics
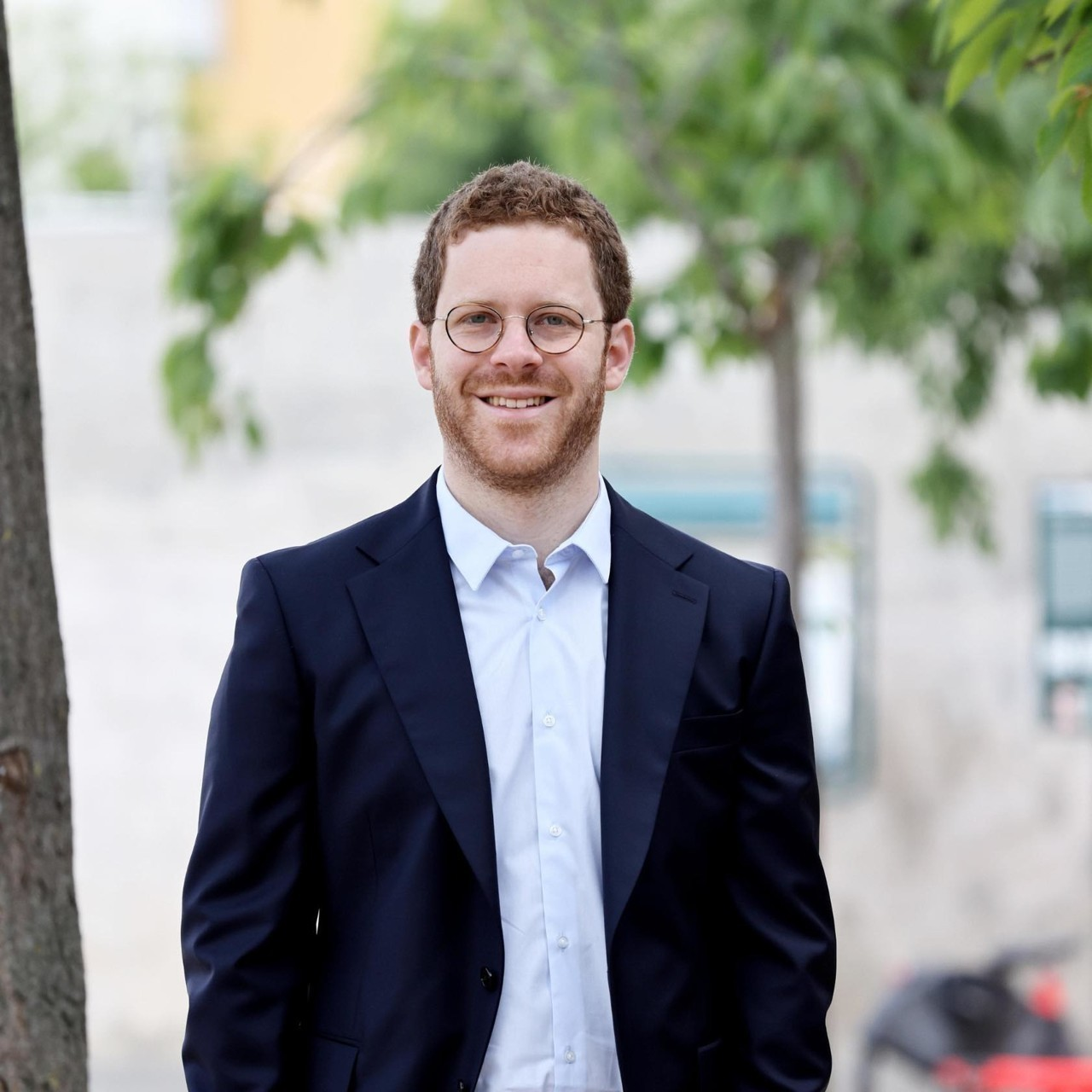
- Incumbent; David Amiel since 22 February 2026
- Style: Monsieur le ministre
- Member of: Council of Ministers
- Reports to: President of the Republic and to Parliament
- Residence: Bercy
- Seat: Paris, France
- Appointer: President of the Republic
- Term length: No fixed term Remains in office while commanding the confidence of the National Assembly and the President of the Republic
- Constituting instrument: Constitution of 4 October 1958
- Precursor: The title of "Minister of Finance" has existed since 1518 in the ancien régime
- Formation: 23 July 1958
- First holder: Antoine Pinay
- Salary: €9,940 per month
- Website: www.info.gouv.fr/ministere/ministere-de-l-action-et-des-comptes-publics

The Ministry of Public Action and Accounts (French: Ministère de l'Action et des Comptes publics) is a ministry of the Government of France. It was created by President Nicolas Sarkozy in 2007, when he split the Ministry of Finance and the Economy into the Ministry of the Budget, Public Accounts and Civil Administration and the Ministry of the Economy, Industry and Employment. Éric Woerth became the first Budget Minister to have a dedicated ministry since Sarkozy himself in 1995.

== History ==
Official logo

Woerth was entrusted with several missions and reforms to be led. The main reforms were to modify the statute of civil servants, to reduce the number of civil servants, to merge the taxation direction and the public compatibility services, to lead a general review of public policies, to reduce the budget deficit, to elaborate a new legislation on online bets.

Budget Minister Jérôme Cahuzac was reattached to the Ministry of the Economy and Finance in 2012; the ministry took its current name and was reestablished again in 2017. It is housed at Bercy, sharing the Economy and Finance Ministry's building on the Seine.

In the government of Prime Minister Jean Castex, Minister for Public Accounts was a junior title held by Olivier Dussopt. Although the officeholder was present at the Council of Ministers, he was administratively attached to the Minister of the Economy, Finance and Recovery, Bruno Le Maire.

== Tasks ==
The Minister of Public Action and Accounts supervises:

- the preparation of the finance law (budget) with the help of his colleague the Minister of the Economy and Finance in taxation ruling matters, he requires the Board for Tax Policy of the Direction générale des Finances Publiques), which is then submitted to Parliament for amendment and final approval;
- the taxation system;
- the accounting of the State and all public bodies (by the Direction générale des Finances Publiques).

The French taxation system is supervised by two separate board:

- the Direction générale des Finances Publiques for tax evaluation and collecting taxes such as VAT or corporate tax, income tax or local taxes based on estate locative value.
- the Direction générale des douanes et des droits indirects for custom, for tax on petrol and fuels and for special indirect taxes such as taxes on alcohol, tobacco);

The taxation information system are being modernised by the so-called Copernic tax project.

By delegation of the Prime Minister, he supervises also the Public Services (essentially statutes and salaries of the State, local and hospital Public Services) and the modernisation of the State (including computing means).

He is responsible with their colleagues for Health, Youth and Sport and for Labour, Labour Relations and Solidarity of the equilibrium of social accounts.

== See also ==
- List of budget ministers of France
