= Emmanuelle Fontaine-Domeizel =

French politician

Member of the National Assembly for Alpes-de-Haute-Provence's 2nd constituency
- In office 22 July 2017 – 3 August 2020
- Preceded by: Christophe Castaner
- Succeeded by: Christophe Castaner

Member of the Alpes-de-Haute-Provence's Departmental council for Canton of Manosque-2
- In office 29 March 2015 – 27 June 2021

Personal details
- Born: 28 August 1973 (age 52) Manosque, France
- Party: Socialist Party (Before 2017); La République En Marche (2017–present)

Emmanuelle Fontaine-Domeizel (born 28 August 1973) is a French nurse and politician of La République En Marche! (LREM) who was a Member of the National Assembly on 22 July 2017, representing Alpes-de-Haute-Provence's 2nd constituency from 2017 to 2020.

== Early life and education ==
Fontaine-Domeizel is the daughter of Claude Domeizel. She was a high-level basketball player. She is now a nurse.

== Political career ==
=== Career in local politics ===
After the departmental elections of 2015, Fontaine-Domeizel was elected departmental councilor of the Canton of Manosque-2 in tandem with Roland Aubert.

=== Member of the National Assembly ===
Fontaine-Domeizel was the substitute for Christophe Castaner as member of the National Assembly for Alpes-de-Haute-Provence's 2nd constituency, and became the member following Castaner's appointment to the government on July 22, 2017.

In the National Assembly, Fontaine-Domeizel served on the Committee on Social Affairs. She was also a Vice President of the Information mission on the revision of the law on bioethics; the Hunting and territories' Working Group; and the France-Vietnam Friendship Group at the French National Assembly.

Fontaine-Domeizel was also a member of several Working Groups on health (End of life; Paramedical Professions; Health and Digital; Health at school).

She left the assembly when Castaner returned to the assembly in August 2020 and left LREM in October of that year.

== Political positions ==
In July 2019, Fontaine-Domeizel voted in favor of the French ratification of the European Union’s Comprehensive Economic and Trade Agreement (CETA) with Canada.

== See also ==
- 2017 French legislative election
