= Jean-Claude Thomas =

French politician

Member of the National Assembly for Marne's 3rd constituency
- In office 12 June 1988 – 17 June 2012
- Preceded by: none (position established)
- Succeeded by: Philippe-Armand Martin

General Councillor of Canton of Reims-10
- In office 17 March 1985 – 16 March 2008
- Preceded by: none (position established)
- Succeeded by: Stéphane Rummel
- Parliamentary group: UMP

Personal details
- Born: 16 March 1950 14th arrondissement of Paris, France
- Died: 13 November 2018 (aged 68) Taissy, Marne, France

Jean-Claude Thomas (16 March 1950 – 13 November 2018) was a member of the National Assembly of France. He represented the Marne department, and was a member of the Gauche démocrate et républicaine.

== Biography ==
Early Life

Jean-Claude Thomas was born on 16 March 1950 in the 14th arrondissement of Paris. Born to Roger Thomas and Georgette Roy, his family collectively ran a grocery store in Paris. When he was three years old, he was sent to Nièvre to live with his aunt and grandparents.

He graduated from the boarding school Lycée Jules-Renard in 1968, and went to medical school in Dijon. He later earned a doctoral degree from a dental school in Reims and became a dentist in 1978.

Political Career

Thomas became deputy to Jean Falala in 1981 and continued in his position when Falala was elected mayor of Reims in 1983. In 1985, Thomas became General Councillor of the newly created Reims-10 district.

Thomas was elected Deputy of the 3rd District of Marne on 18 June 1988 with a slim 50.29% majority over Jean-Claude Fontalirand. He was re-elected in 1992, 1997, 2002, and 2007.

Jean Falala resigned in 1999 amid health concerns, and was succeeded by Jean-Louis Schneiter. Schneiter kept Thomas as General Councillor, and was re-elected in 2001.

However, in 2008, Thomas was defeated by socialist Stéphane Rummel, with 58.15% to 41.85% of votes.

Thomas opted not to run for re-election in Marne's 3rd district in the 2012 elections, instead being succeeded by Philippe-Armand Martin.

Jean-Claude Thomas died on 13 November 2018 at age 68.
