= Marne's 3rd constituency =

Constituency of the National Assembly of France

3rd constituency of Marne
- inline Constituency of the National Assembly of France

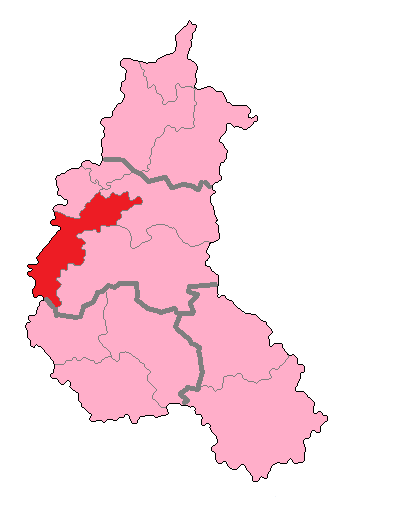
- The constituency shown within Champagne-Ardenne
- Incumbent deputy: Maxime Michelet; LR (UXD)
- Department: Marne
- Cantons: Beine-Nauroy, Bourgogne, Reims-4, Reims-8, Reims-10, Suippes
- Registered voters: 80,596 (2017)

The 3rd constituency of Marne (French: Troisième circonscription de la Marne) is one of five electoral districts in the department of the same name, each of which returns one deputy to the French National Assembly in elections using the two-round system, with a run-off if no candidate receives more than 50% of the vote in the first round.

== Description ==
The constituency is made up of the six former cantons of Beine-Nauroy, Bourgogne, Reims-4, Reims-8, Reims-10, and Suippes.

It covers most of the western edge of the department, plus an area to the south of Reims. Its largest town is Épernay. Today's 3rd constituency bears no resemblance to that of the same name which existed prior to the 2012 election; instead it covers most of the area of the now abolished 6th constituency.

At the time of the 1999 census (which was the basis for the most recent redrawing of constituency boundaries, carried out in 2010) the constituency had a total population of 96,350.

Despite the above-mentioned boundary changes, the area has remained consistently conservative in its voting habits, returning Philippe-Armand Martin (who had previously represented the 6th constituency) at the 2012 election. Martin did not run in the 2017 election and the seat was won by Éric Girardin of La République En Marche!.

== Historic representation ==
Election	Member	Party
1986	Proportional representation – no election by constituency	
1988	Jean-Claude Thomas	RPR
1993	Jean-Claude Thomas	RPR
1997	Jean-Claude Thomas	RPR
2002	Jean-Claude Thomas	UMP
2007	Jean-Claude Thomas	UMP
2012	Philippe-Armand Martin	UMP
2017	Éric Girardin	LREM
2022	Éric Girardin	RE
2024	Maxime Michelet	UXD

== Election results ==
=== 2024 ===
Candidate	Party	Alliance	First round			Second round		
Candidate	Party	Alliance	Votes	%	+/–	Votes	%	+/–
Maxime Michelet	LR-RN	UXD	21,890	43.84	new	25,259	50.88	new
Eric Girardin	RE	Ensemble	15,942	31.92	+1.15	24,384	49.12	-2.31
Chantal Berthélémy	PCF	NFP	9,397	18.82	+0.94			
Johanna Jabbour	DLF	DSV	1,219	2.44	-0.48			
Charlotte Comerais	LO		769	1.54	-0.11			
Julien Sene	REC		719	1.44	-3.10			
Votes			49,936	100.00		49,643	100.00	
Valid votes			49,936	96.46	-0.83	49,643	95.49	+3.03
Blank votes			1,257	2.43	+0.69	1,844	3.55	-2.54
Null votes			575	1.11	+0.14	498	0.96	-0.49
Turnout			51,768	65.97	+20.71	51,985	66.23	+22.01
Abstentions			26,708	34.03	-20.71	26,507	33.77	-22.01
Registered voters			78,476			78,492		
Result			UXD GAIN FROM RE					

=== 2022 ===
Legislative Election 2022: Marne's 3rd constituency
Party	Candidate	Votes	%	±%
LREM (Ensemble)	Éric Girardin	10,841	30.77	-1.10
RN	Jennifer Marc	10,215	28.99	+7.42
PCF (NUPÉS)	Chantal Berthelemy	6,302	17.88	−0.27
LR (UDC)	Antoine Jacquet	3,169	8.99	−11.75
REC	Thomas Adnot	1,601	4.54	N/A
DLF (UPF)	Johanna Jabbour	1,030	2.92	+0.29
DVE	Sonia D'orgeville	789	2.24	+1.21
PA	Bertrand Debarle	710	2.01	N/A
LO	Charlotte Cormerais	581	1.65	+0.65
Turnout		35,238	45.26	−1.46
2nd round result
LREM (Ensemble)	Éric Girardin	16,836	51.43	-8.18
RN	Jennifer Marc	15,897	48.57	+8.18
Turnout		32,733	44.22	+2.85
LREM hold				

=== 2017 ===
Candidate	Label	First round		Second round	
Candidate	Label	Votes	%	Votes	%
Éric Girardin	REM	11,750	31.87	17,946	59.61
Baptiste Philippo	FN	7,953	21.57	12,160	40.39
Rachel Paillard	LR	7,647	20.74		
Roland Jacques	FI	3,550	9.63		
Pierre Martinet	PCF	2,357	6.39		
Jacky Blavier	DLF	968	2.63		
Éric Lamaille	DVD	826	2.24		
David Nicanor	ECO	786	2.13		
Colette Leclercq-Chaudet	ECO	381	1.03		
Laurent Gosseau	EXG	370	1.00		
Jérôme Milutinovic	DIV	286	0.78		
Votes		36,874	100.00	30,106	100.00
Valid votes		36,874	97.93	30,106	90.29
Blank votes		584	1.55	2,539	7.62
Null votes		194	0.52	697	2.09
Turnout		37,652	46.72	33,342	41.37
Abstentions		42,947	53.28	47,254	58.63
Registered voters		80,599		80,596	
Source: Ministry of the Interior

=== 2012 ===
Legislative Election 2012: Marne's 3rd constituency
Party	Candidate	Votes	%	±%
UMP	Philippe-Armand Martin	14,526	32.76	
EELV	Eric Loiselet	11,069	24.97	
FN	David Mascre	6,891	15.54	
DVD	Franck Leroy	4,779	10.78	
DVG	Jean-Paul Angers	2,336	5.27	
FG	Jean-Pierre Langlet	2,184	4.93	
Far left	Michel Martin	902	2.03	
Others	N/A	1,650		
Turnout		44,337	54.53	
2nd round result
UMP	Philippe-Armand Martin	23,135	55.78	
EELV	Eric Loiselet	18,342	44.22	
Turnout		41,477	51.01	
UMP hold				

== Sources ==
Official results of French elections from 2002: "Résultats électoraux officiels en France" (in French).

Official results of French elections from 2017: "" (in French).
