= Gérard Weber =

French politician

Deputy for Ardèche's 2nd constituency in the French National assembly
- Preceded by: Jacques Dondoux
- Succeeded by: Olivier Dussopt

Personal details
- Born: 18 November 1948 Orléansville, French Algeria
- Died: 17 November 2016 (aged 67) Annonay, France
- Party: UMP
- Occupation: Politician

Gérard Weber (1948 – 2016) was a French politician. Born in French Algeria, he became a kinesiotherapist. He served as a member of the National Assembly from 2002 to 2007, representing Ardèche's 2nd constituency. He also served as the mayor of Annonay from 2001 to 2008.
