= Castaner =

Castaner or Castañer is a surname. Notable people with the surname include:

- Christophe Castaner (born 1966), French lawyer and politician
- Juan Castañer Ponce Enrile Jr. (born 1958), Filipino politician
- Lolita Ortiz Castañer (born 1944), Spanish footballer
