= Sophie-Laurence Roy =

French politician (born 1955)

Member of the National Assembly for Yonne's 2nd constituency
- Incumbent
- Assumed office 18 July 2024
- Preceded by: André Villiers

Member of the municipal council of Flogny-la-Chapelle
- Incumbent
- Assumed office 2020

Personal details
- Born: 23 December 1955 (age 70) Paris, France
- Party: National Rally (2024–present)
- Other political affiliations: The Republicans (until 2024)
- Occupation: Lawyer

Sophie-Laurence Roy (French: [sɔfi lɔʁɑ̃s ʁwa]; born 23 December 1955) is a French lawyer and politician of the National Rally (RN) who has served as a member of the National Assembly for Yonne's 2nd constituency since 2024.
