= Ardèche's 2nd constituency =

Constituency of the National Assembly of France

2nd constituency of Ardèche
- inline Constituency of the National Assembly of France

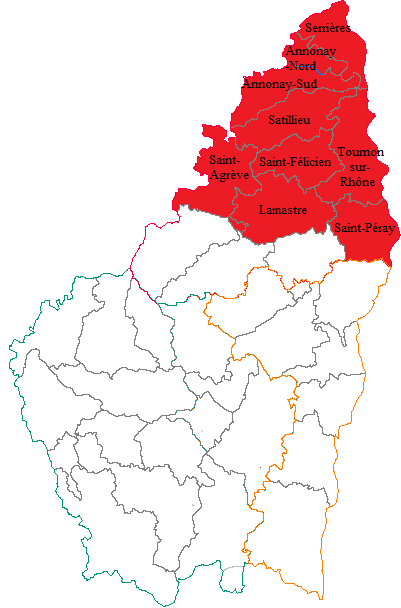
- constituency's location in Ardèche

- Ardèche's location in France
- Deputy: Vincent Trébuchet; LR (UXD)
- Department: Ardèche
- Cantons: Annonay-Nord, Annonay-Sud, Lamastre, Saint-Agrève, Saint-Félicien, Saint-Péray, Satillieu, Serrières, Tournon
- Registered voters: 120,390

The 2nd constituency of Ardèche is a French legislative constituency in the Ardèche département.

== Deputies ==
Election	Member	Party
1988	Régis Perbet	RPR
1993	Henri-Jean Arnaud	RPR
1997	Jacques Dondoux	PRG
2002	Gérard Weber	UMP
2007	Olivier Dussopt	PS
2012	Olivier Dussopt	PS
2017	Olivier Dussopt	PS
2017	Michèle Victory (Note: Substitute for Olivier Dussopt)	PS
2022	Olivier Dussopt	TdP
2024	Vincent Trébuchet	LR

== Election results ==
=== 2024 ===
Candidate	Party	Alliance	First round			Second round		
Candidate	Party	Alliance	Votes	%	+/–	Votes	%	+/–
Vincent Trebuchet	LR-RN	UXD	24,417	35.75	+16.72	33,926	52.76	
Michèle Victory	PS	NFP	17,051	24.97	+1.39	30,372	47.24	
Laurence Heydel Grillere	RE	ENS	11,904	17.43	-12.61			
Jean-Paul Vallon	DVD		10,509	15.39	N/A			
Rémy Nodin	DIV		2,197	3.22	N/A			
Gérard Montreynaud	REC		777	1.14	-2.40			
Jacky Ritz	DLF		613	0.90	-0.65			
Michèle Gaillard	LO		609	0.89	-0.39			
Gérard Julien	DIV		213	0.31	N/A			
Valid votes			68,290	97.00	-1.03	64,298	91.03	
Blank votes			1,420	2.02	+0.45	4,868	6.89	
Null votes			694	0.99	+0.48	1,464	2.07	
Turnout			70,404	72.48	+19.62	70,630	72.70	
Abstentions			26,734	27.52	-19.62	26,521	27.30	
Registered voters			97,138			97,151		
Source: Ministry of the Interior, Le Monde
Result						LR GAIN FROM TdP		

=== 2022 ===
Legislative Election 2022: Ardèche's 2nd constituency
Party	Candidate	Votes	%	±%
TdP (Ensemble)	Olivier Dussopt*	15,014	30.04	+4.08
LFI (NUPÉS)	Christophe Goulouzelle	11,785	23.58	-14.69
RN	Cyrille Grangier	9,512	19.03	+6.73
LR (UDC)	Marc-Antoine Quenette	8,941	17.89	+4.45
REC	Philippe Bory	1,767	3.54	N/A
Others	N/A	2,960	-	−
Turnout		49,979	52.86	−0.72
2nd round result
TdP (Ensemble)	Olivier Dussopt*	25,684	58.86	+15.16
LFI (NUPÉS)	Christophe Goulouzelle	17,955	41.14	N/A
Turnout		43,639	49.64	+3.06
TdP gain from PS				

* Dussopt stood for PS at the previous election, but is standing for TdP as part of the Ensemble alliance having joined the Borne government as Minister of Labour in May 2022. For swing calculation purposes, Dussopt's result at the last election is counted with the NUPES alliance, which is endorsed by PS.

=== 2017 ===
Candidate	Label	First round		Second round	
Candidate	Label	Votes	%	Votes	%
Laurette Gouyet-Pommaret	REM	12,718	25.96	17,179	43.70
Olivier Dussopt	PS	11,531	23.54	22,132	56.30
Marc-Antoine Quenette	LR	6,585	13.44		
Odile Lasfargues-Bouyon	FN	6,026	12.30		
Samia Hasnaoui	FI	4,897	10.00		
Jean-Paul Vallon	DVD	3,293	6.72		
Nadia Senni	ECO	1,460	2.98		
Isabelle François	DLF	1,116	2.28		
Daniel Babarossa	PCF	859	1.75		
Christophe Marchisio	EXG	263	0.54		
Isabelle Strubi	DIV	239	0.49		
Jean-Paul Louis Vallon	EXD	0	0.00		
Votes		48,987	100.00	39,311	100.00
Valid votes		48,987	98.24	39,311	90.69
Blank votes		627	1.26	2,839	6.55
Null votes		253	0.51	1,196	2.76
Turnout		49,867	53.58	43,346	46.58
Abstentions		43,197	46.42	49,718	53.42
Registered voters		93,064		93,064	

=== 2012 ===
Summary of the 10 June and 17 June 2007 French legislative in Ardèche’s 2nd Constituency election results
Candidate	Party		1st round		2nd round	
Candidate	Party		Votes	%	Votes	%
Olivier Dussopt	Socialist Party	PS	22,629	40.29%	28,990	53.35%
Mathieu Darnaud	Union for a Popular Movement	UMP	19,029	33.88%	25,347	46.65%
Véronique Gathercole	National Front	FN	7,583	13.50%		
Myriam Normand	Left Front	FG	2,368	4.22%		
Justine Arnaud	The Greens	VEC	1,907	3.40%		
Claude Escande		CEN	948	1.69%		
Raphaël Nogier	Miscellaneous Right	DVD	377	0.67%		
Brigitte Tussau	Ecologist	ECO	342	0.61%		
Anne-Laure le Grand	Miscellaneous Right	DVD	317	0.56%		
Pascal Guion	Far Left	EXG	271	0.48%		
Jackie Durand	Ecologist	ECO	208	0.37%		
Christophe Marchisio	Far Left	EXG	179	0.32%		
Gabriel Bardonnet	Other	AUT	1	0.00%		
Total			56,159	100%	54,337	100%
Registered voters			90,928		90,825	
Blank/Void ballots			750	1.32%	1,335	2.40%
Turnout			56,909	62.59%	55,672	61.30%
Abstentions			34,019	37.41%	35,153	38.70%
Result					PS HOLD	

=== 2007 ===
Summary of the 10 June and 17 June 2007 French legislative in Ardèche’s 2nd Constituency election results
Candidate	Party		1st round		2nd round	
Candidate	Party		Votes	%	Votes	%
Olivier Dussopt	Socialist Party	PS	14,186	26.10%	29,096	53.71%
Gérard Weber	Union for a Popular Movement	UMP	15,964	29.37%	25,073	46.29%
Jacques Dubay	Miscellaneous Right	DVD	9,171	16.87%		
Dominique Chambon	Democratic Movement	MoDem	4,793	8.82%		
Claude Richard	National Front	FN	2,021	3.72%		
Jean Fantini	Communist	COM	1,909	3.51%		
Jean-Claude Mourgues	The Greens	VEC	1,857	3.42%		
Odette Gorisse	Far Left	EXG	1,365	2.51%		
Véronique Faure	Hunting, Fishing, Nature, Traditions	CPNT	761	1.40%		
Brigitte Inglese	Ecologist	ECO	641	1.18%		
Christophe Frachon	Movement for France	MPF	585	1.08%		
Béatrice Cauvin	Far Left	EXG	443	0.81%		
Patrick Schoun	Divers	DIV	345	0.63%		
Michel Rouby	Far Right	EXD	316	0.58%		
Total			54,357	100%	54,169	100%
Registered voters			88,921		88,923	
Blank/Void ballots			1,032	1.86%	1,714	3.07%
Turnout			55,389	62.29%	55,883	62.84%
Abstentions			33,532	37.71%	33,040	37.16%
Result					PS GAIN	

=== 2002 ===
Legislative Election 2002: Ardèche's 2nd constituency
Party	Candidate	Votes	%	±%
UMP	Gérard Weber	15,629	28.79	
PS	Catherine Rolin	13,454	24.78	
UDF	Dominique Chambon	6,746	12.42	
DIV	Jean-Paul Vallon	5,629	10.37	
FN	Francoise Vanhove	5,449	10.04	
LV	Jean-Claude Mourgues	2,594	4.78	
Others	N/A	4,794		
Turnout		55,351	66.58	
2nd round result
UMP	Gérard Weber	26,634	53.84	
PS	Catherine Rolin	22,835	46.16	
Turnout		51,471	61.92	
UMP gain from PRG				

=== 1997 ===
Legislative Election 1997: Ardèche's 2nd constituency
Party	Candidate	Votes	%	±%
RPR	Henri-Jean Arnaud	16,086	31.62	
PRG	Jacques Dondoux	15,473	30.42	
FN	Henri Desprès	7,050	13.86	
PCF	Patrick Laybros	3,644	7.16	
LV	Michel Rabanit	2,488	4.89	
MPF	Patrick de La Rivière	2,147	4.22	
DIV	François Egéa	1,238	2.43	
DIV	Stéphane Wendliger	1,193	2.35	
GE	Malike Benkhellaf	1,028	2.02	
DVG	Christine Nucci	519	1.02	
Turnout		53,712	67.86	
2nd round result
PRG	Jacques Dondoux	28,357	51.69	
RPR	Henri-Jean Arnaud	26,500	48.31	
Turnout		58,098	73.40	
PRG gain from RPR				
