= 2015 Provence-Alpes-Côte d'Azur regional election =

- 6 and 13 December 2015

All 123 regional councillors
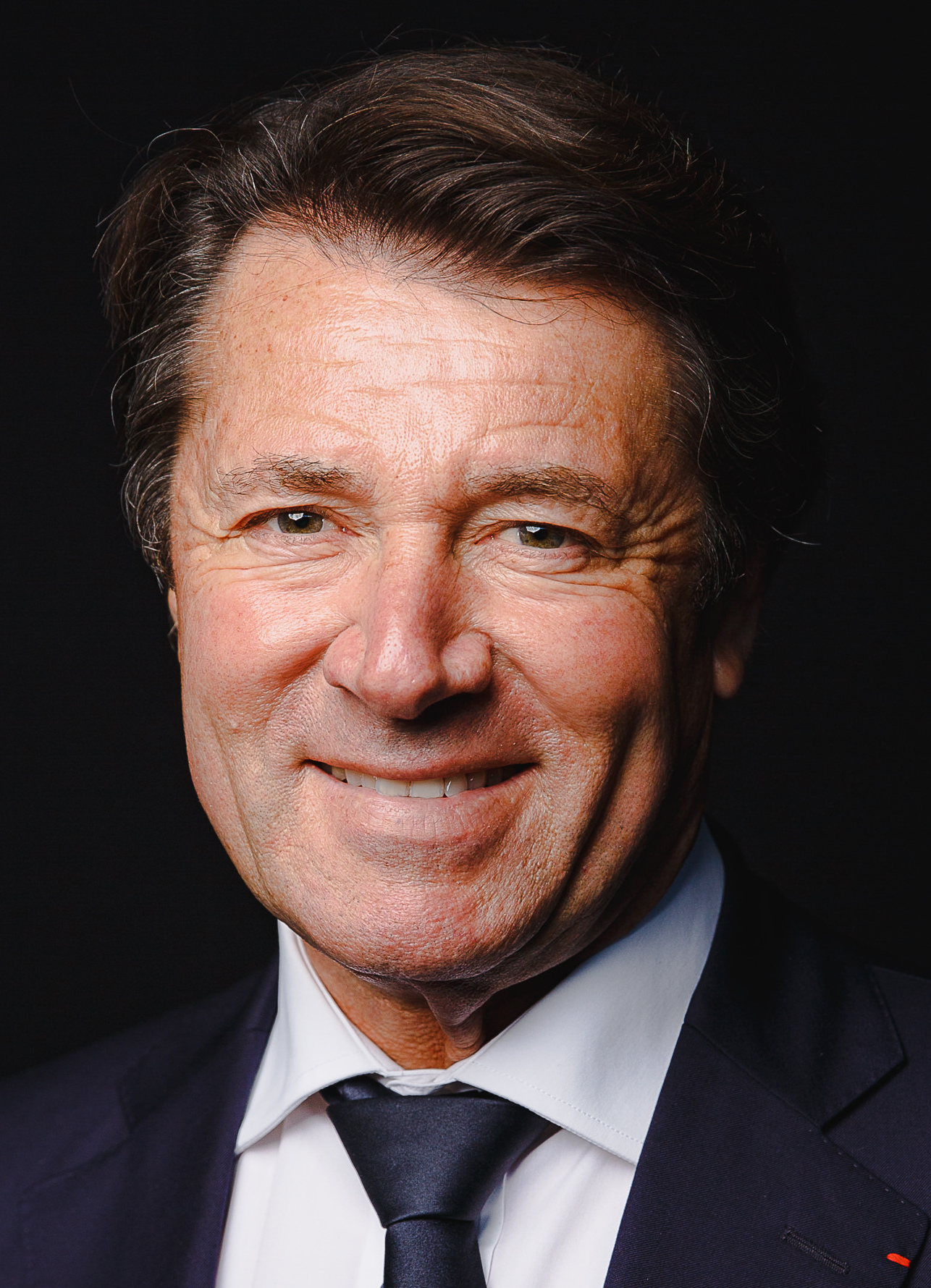

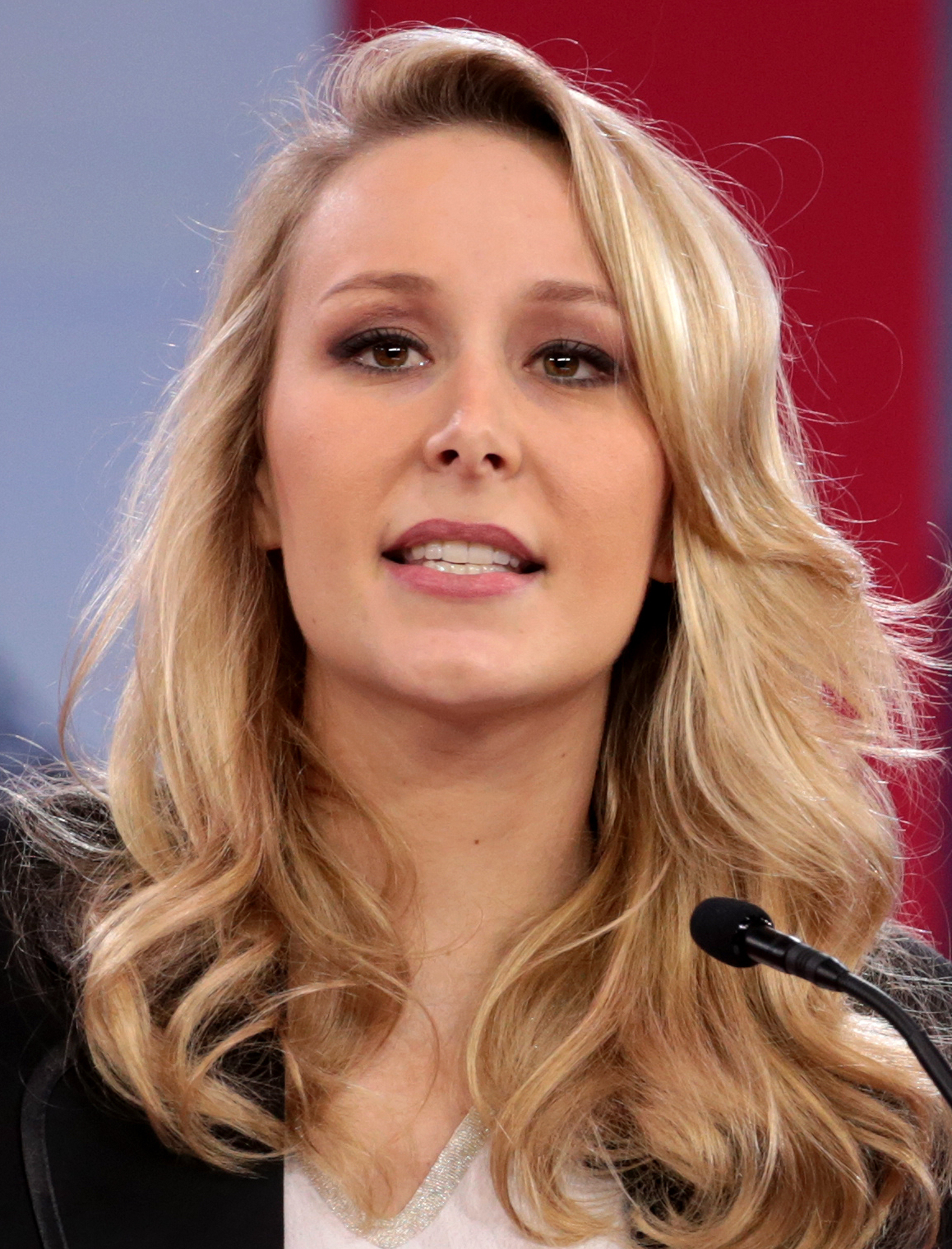

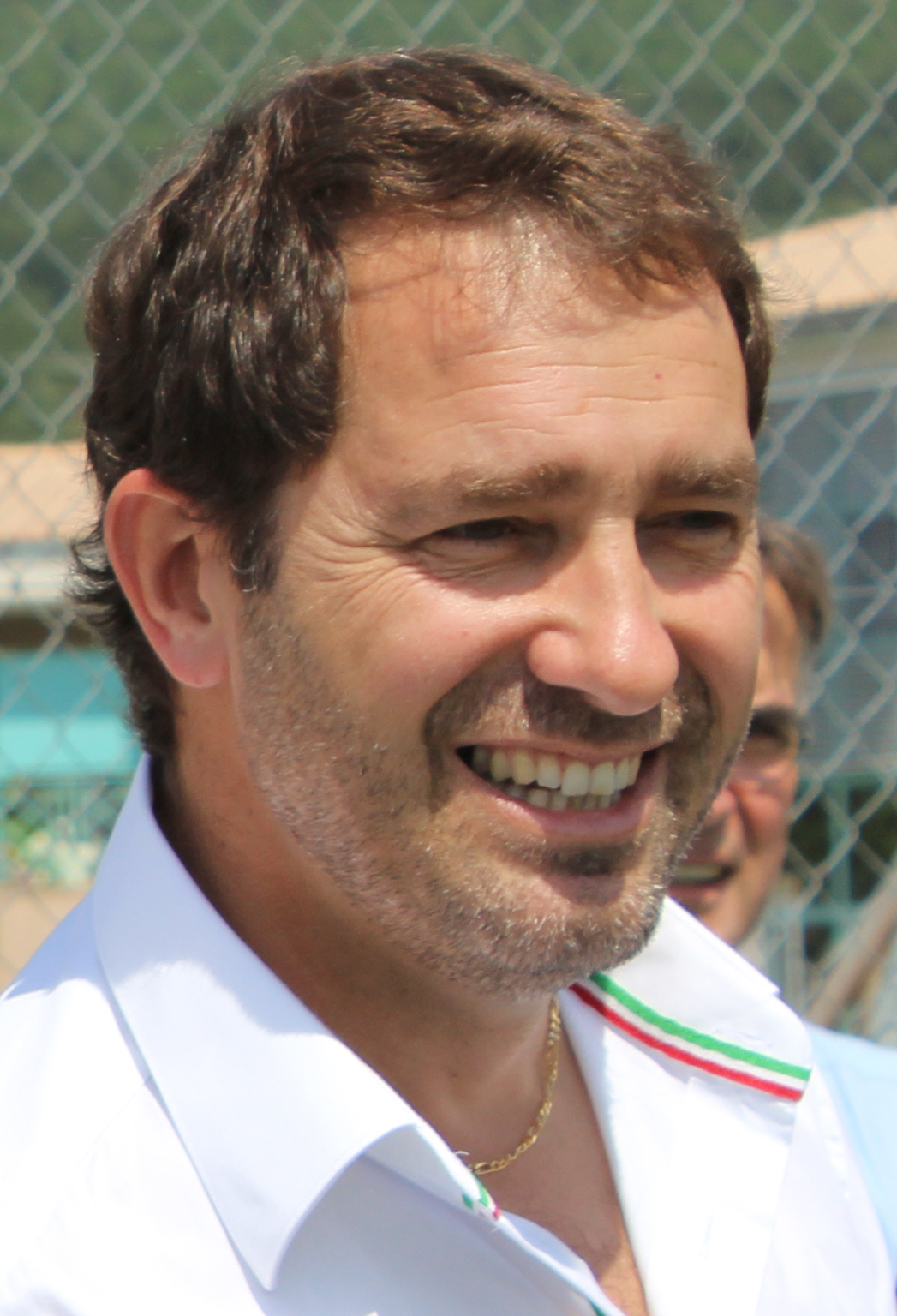
	First party	Second party	Third party
Leader	Christian Estrosi	Marion Maréchal-Le Pen	Christophe Castaner
Party	LR	FN	PS
Seats won	81	42	0
First round	469,884	719,746	294,398
Percentage	26.47%	40.55%	16.59%
Second round	1,073,485	886,147	Withdrew
Percentage	54.78%	45.22%	Withdrew
President of the Regional Council before election
Michel Vauzelle
PS
Elected President of the Regional Council
Christian Estrosi
LR

The 2015 Provence-Alpes-Côte d'Azur regional election took place on 6 (first round) and 13 December (second round) to renew the 123 members of the Regional Council of Provence-Alpes-Côte d'Azur.

On the first round, the Front National, led by Marion Maréchal-Le Pen, placed far ahead with over 40% of the vote, 14 points ahead of the lead right-wing candidate Christian Estrosi of The Republicans and 24 points ahead of the incumbent party list, that of the Socialist Party, whose lead candidate Christophe Castaner decided to withdraw the list from the second round, to allow Christian Estrosi a one-on-one round with the National Front.

On the second round, the right-wing list won the most votes, but the National Rally achieved more than 45% of the vote, the best result to date of the far-right in any region of France. The right-wing list took the presidency of the regional council after 17 years of Socialist rule under Michel Vauzelle, who did not seek reelection. The Socialist Party was removed altogether from the regional council. To date, it has not managed to regain a single seat in the regional council.

== Voting system ==
The regional elections are held in direct universal suffrage using proportional representation lists. The election is held over two rounds, with majority bonus. The lists must be gender balanced by alternatively have a male candidate and a female candidate from the top to the bottom of the list. Only lists with as many candidates as available seats in every departement of the region may compete.

Following the 1999 and 2003 electoral reforms, with a first implementation in 2004, a two-round runoff voting system is used to elect the regional presidents. If no party gets at least 50% of the vote in the first round, a second round is held, which any party who got at least 10% in the first round may enter. Lists that obtain at least 5% of the vote in the first round may merge in the second round with a 'qualified list', which includes candidates from each merged list.

At the decisive round (first round if a list won 50%, the second round if not), the leading list receives a premium of 25% of the seats while the remaining seats are distributed among all lists who received at least 5% of votes. Thus, the majority bonus allows a leading list to have an absolute majority of seats in the Regional Council from one third of votes in the second round. The seats are distributed among the lists at the regional level but within each list, seats are allocated by departement branch in proportion to the number of votes in each department.

In the regional council there are 123 members, and they are elected in the 6 departments(4 members for Alpes-de-Haute-Provence, 4 for Hautes-Alpes, 28 for the Alpes-Maritimes, 47 for the Bouches-du-Rhône, 27 for the Var and 13 for Vaucluse

== Results ==
Provence-Alpes-Côte d'Azur uses a two-round runoff system to elect the regional president, and if not candidate win at least 50% on the first round there are another and definitive round.

=== First round ===
The first round election was held on 6 December 2015.

List	Votes	Votes %
Socialist Party	294,395	16.59
Europe Ecology – The Greens	116,119	6.54
Nouvelle Donne	11,275	0.64
Total left-wing	421,789	23.77
Union of the Right	469,881	26.48
France Arise	34,599	1.95
Total right-wing	504,480	28.43
National Front	719,706	40.55
Ligue du Sud	19,891	1.12
Total far-right	739,597	41.67
Independent Ecological Alliance	71,895	4.05
Lutte Ouvrière	26,278	1.48
Popular Republican Union	10,762	0.61
Total	1,831,013	100
Registered voters/turnout	3,525,268	51.94

=== Second round ===
Runoff elections were held on 13 December 2015 in regions where no candidate was able to win outright in the first round.

Christian Estrosi won the second round with nearly 55% of the vote, thanks to the withdrawal of the left-wing list of Christophe Castaner.

List	Votes	Votes %	Seats	Seats %
Union of the Right	1,073,485	54.78	81	65.9
National Front	886,147	45.22	42	34.1
Total	2,126,066	100	123	100
Registered voters/turnout	3,525,275	60.31		

=== Distribution by departments ===
Constituency	LR		FN	
Constituency	%	S	%	S
Alpes-de-Haute-Provence	55.9	3	44.1	1
Hautes-Alpes	61.2	3	38.8	1
Alpes-Maritimes	58.6	19	41.4	9
Bouches-du-Rhône	56	31	44	16
Var	50.9	17	49.1	10
Vaucluse	48.7	8	51.3	5
Total	54.8	81	45.2	42
