= Daniel Spagnou =

French politician (1940–2026)

Deputy to the National Assembly of France
- In office 2002–2012
- Preceded by: Robert Honde
- Succeeded by: Christophe Castaner
- Constituency: Alpes de Haute Provence 2nd

Personal details
- Born: 22 September 1940 Barcelonnette, Alpes-de-Haute-Provence, France
- Died: 31 August 2026 (aged 85) Gap, Hautes-Alpes, France
- Party: UMP LR Agir

Daniel Spagnou (22 September 1940 – 31 August 2026) was a French politician who was a member of the National Assembly of France. He represented the second constituency of Alpes-de-Haute-Provence department as a member of the Union for a Popular Movement from 2002 to 2012.

== Life and career ==
Daniel Spagnou was born in Barcelonnette, Alpes-de-Haute-Provence, France on 22 September 1940. He worked as a savings bank manager.

He entered politics by becoming mayor of Sisteron on 14 March 1983. He held this position until his death, his list having obtained 57% of the votes cast in 2020.

From 15 April 1985 to 18 March 2001 he was a member of the Alpes-de-Haute-Provence General Council. He was vice-president from 1988 to 2001.

For 10 years, from 23 March 1992 to 1 July 2002, he was also a member of the Provence-Alpes-Côte d'Azur Regional Council, of which he was vice-president from 1992 to 1998.

On 16 June 2002, he was elected deputy for the 2nd constituency of Alpes-de-Haute-Provence for the 12th legislature (2002–2007). He beat outgoing MP Robert Honde, former PRG mayor of Manosque in the second round, collecting 59.91% of the vote in the second round.

Spagnou was re-elected deputy on 17 June 2007, for the 13th legislature (2007–2012), beating, in the second round, Christophe Castaner, the PS mayor of Forcalquier, with 53.97% of the vote. He sat in the UMP group. He belonged to the Committee on Cultural Affairs and was a member of the National Assembly delegation on women's rights and equal opportunities between men and women.

He was a member of the National Assembly's Tibet Study Group.

In January 2011, he announced on his site that he would not be a candidate in the 2012 legislative elections.

At the end of 2017, he joined Agir, the constructive right.

Spagnou died on 31 August 2026, at the age of 85.

== Titles ==
- Officer of the Legion of Honour, 14 July 2019.
- Knight of the Legion of Honour, 1999.
