= Yonne's 2nd constituency =

Constituency of the National Assembly of France

2nd constituency of Yonne
- inline Constituency of the National Assembly of France

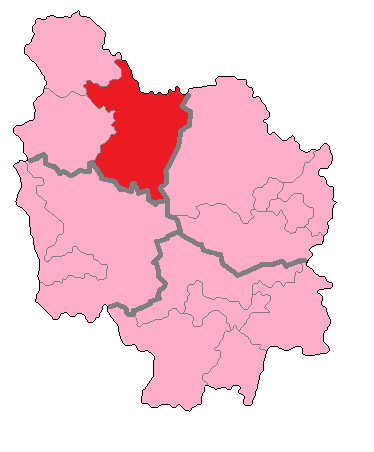
- Yonne's 2nd Constituency shown within Burgundy
- Deputy: Sophie-Laurence Roy; LR (UXD)
- Department: Yonne
- Cantons: Ancy-le-Franc, Avallon, Brienon-sur-Armançon, Chablis, Coulanges-sur-Yonne (sauf communes d'Andryes et d'Étais-la-Sauvin), Cruzy-le-Châtel, Flogny-la-Chapelle, Guillon, L'Isle-sur-Serein, Ligny-le-Châtel, Migennes, Noyers, Quarré-les-Tombes, Saint-Florentin, Seignelay (part), Tonnerre, Vermenton, Vézelay
- Registered voters: 77,710

The 2nd constituency of the Yonne is a French legislative constituency in the Yonne département.

== Description ==
Yonne's 2nd Constituency covers the east of the department and includes the famous vineyards of Chablis along with many other small towns and villages. The most substantial of which is Avallon in the south east of the constituency.

== Historic Representation ==
Election	Member	Party
2002	Jean-Marie Rolland	UMP
2007	Jean-Marie Rolland	UMP
2012	Jean-Yves Caullet	PS
2017	André Villiers	UDI
2022	André Villiers	Horizons
2024	Sophie-Laurence Roy	LR

== Election results ==
Legislative Election 2024: Yonne's 2nd constituency
Party	Candidate	Votes	%	±%
DLF	Thomas Verhegge	895	1.90	n/a
DVE	Iris Nakov	1,019	2.16	−1.20
HOR (Ensemble)	André Villiers	13,837	29.33	+0.11
LFI (NFP)	Philippe Veyssière	9,197	19.50	−1.82
LR (UXD)	Sophie-Laurence Roy	20,997	44.51	+13.79
LO	Anita Carrasco	608	1.29	n/a
REC	Sylvie Demussy	620	1.31	−3.37
Turnout		47,173	96.59	+46.59
Registered electors		72,260		
2nd round result
LR	Sophie-Laurence Roy	23,736	50.42	−0.92
HOR	André Villiers	23,342	49.58	+0.92
Turnout		47,078	95.37	46.82
Registered electors		72,260		
LR gain from HOR				

=== 2022 ===
Legislative Election 2022: Yonne's 2nd constituency
Party	Candidate	Votes	%	±%
RN	Audrey Lopez	10,936	30.72	+11.16
HOR (Ensemble)	André Villiers*	10,402	29.22	-1.00
LFI (NUPÉS)	Philippe Veyssiere	7,589	21.32	+3.17
R!	Florian Frayer	2,062	5.79	N/A
REC	Marie Dumoulin	1,665	4.68	N/A
DVE	Iris Nakov	1,196	3.36	N/A
Others	N/A	1,704	-	−
Turnout		35,596	50.00	−0.71
2nd round result
HOR (Ensemble)	André Villiers*	16,760	51.34	+5.43
RN	Audrey Lopez	15,883	48.66	N/A
Turnout		32,643	48.55	+9.69
HOR gain from UDI				

* André Villiers stood for UDI, as part of the UDC alliance, in 2017. He joined Horizons, part of the Ensemble coalition, in 2022. The swing is calculated against the LREM candidate from 2017, as LREM is also part of the Ensemble alliance.

=== 2017 ===
Legislative Election 2017: Yonne's 2nd constituency
Party	Candidate	Votes	%	±%
LREM	Jean-Yves Caullet	11,275	30.22	
UDI	André Villiers	8,321	22.30	
FN	Edwige Jacquet	7,300	19.56	
LFI	Philippe Collin	4,169	11.17	
PCF	François Meyroune	1,652	4.43	
PRG	Elodie Roy	1,035	2.77	
EELV	Guillaume Durand	952	2.55	
DLF	Mehdi Barbot	831	2.23	
Others	N/A	1,779		
Turnout		37,314	49.29	
2nd round result
UDI	André Villiers	15,911	54.09	
LREM	Jean-Yves Caullet	13,505	45.91	
Turnout		29,416	38.86	
UDI gain from PS				

=== 2012 ===
Legislative Election 2012: Yonne's 2nd constituency
Party	Candidate	Votes	%	±%
PS	Jean-Yves Caullet	16,027	34.69	
UMP	Jean-Marie Rolland	13,618	29.48	
FN	Claude Dassie	7,402	16.02	
NM	Patrick Gendraud	3,836	8.30	
FG	Martine Millet	2,567	5.56	
EELV	Thomas Gueret	1,293	2.80	
Others	N/A	1,454		
Turnout		46,197	59.45	
2nd round result
PS	Jean-Yves Caullet	22,274	50.25	
UMP	Jean-Marie Rolland	22,050	49.75	
Turnout		44,324	57.04	
PS gain from UMP				

=== 2007 ===
Legislative Election 2007: Yonne's 2nd constituency
Party	Candidate	Votes	%	±%
UMP	Jean-Marie Rolland	19,365	44.99	
PS	Jean-Yves Caullet	12,378	28.76	
FN	Marie-Solange Mansard	2,647	6.15	
MoDem	Juliette Benedetti	2,577	5.99	
Far left	Jacqueline Desanti	1,569	3.65	
LV	Bernard Pesquet	1,483	3.45	
CPNT	Françoise Petas	886	2.06	
Others	N/A	2,137		
Turnout		44,099	59.71	
2nd round result
UMP	Jean-Marie Rolland	23,234	53.82	
PS	Jean-Yves Caullet	19,932	46.18	
Turnout		44,590	60.37	
UMP hold				

=== 2002 ===
Legislative Election 2002: Yonne's 2nd constituency
Party	Candidate	Votes	%	±%
PS	Jean-Yves Caullet	15,304	33.60	
UMP	Jean-Marie Rolland	13,319	29.24	
FN	Marc Fournier	7,162	15.72	
DVD	Maurice Pianon	5,387	11.83	
CPNT	Serge Courtin	1,073	2.36	
LO	Armand Gaudiau	943	2.07	
Others	N/A	2,359		
Turnout		46,771	64.46	
2nd round result
UMP	Jean-Marie Rolland	22,274	52.47	
PS	Jean-Yves Caullet	20,174	47.53	
Turnout		44,580	61.45	
UMP gain from PS				

=== 1997 ===
Legislative Election 1997: Yonne's 2nd constituency
Party	Candidate	Votes	%	±%
RPR	Yves Van Haecke	12,063	26.16	
PS	Henri Nallet	11,730	25.44	
FN	Claude Moreau	8,409	18.24	
PCF	Guy Lavrat	5,452	11.82	
LV	Jean-François Gillon	2,829	6.14	
DVD	Renaud de Belmont	1,405	3.05	
DIV	Olivier Delafon	1,366	2.96	
LO	Armand Gaudiau	1,356	2.94	
Others	N/A	1,496		
Turnout		48,751	69.02	
2nd round result
PS	Henri Nallet	26,079	53.95	
RPR	Yves Van Haecke	22,259	46.05	
Turnout		52,071	73.74	
PS gain from RPR				

== Sources ==
Official results of French elections from 2002: "Résultats électoraux officiels en France" (in French).
