= Catherine Barbaroux =

French politician

President of La République En Marche! Acting
- In office 8 May 2017 – 17 August 2017
- Preceded by: Emmanuel Macron
- Succeeded by: Christophe Castaner

Personal details
- Born: 1 April 1949 (age 75)
- Political party: La République En Marche!

Catherine Barbaroux (French pronunciation: [katʁin baʁbaʁu]; born 1 April 1949) is a French politician who previously served as the acting president of the political movement En Marche!, after she succeeded Emmanuel Macron following his election as President of France.

== Early life ==
Catherine Barbaroux was born on 1 April 1949. Her parents were immigrants from Spain; her grandparents worked as miners in Asturias. Her father was a member of the French Communist Party.

Barbaroux graduated from Sciences Po in 1975.

== Career ==
Barbaroux worked as an advisor to Trade Minister Michel Crépeau from 1981 to 1986. She worked in human resources for Prisunic and Pinault-Printemps-Redoute (now known as Kering) from 1986 to 1993. She worked as an advisor to Employment Ministers Martine Aubry, Élisabeth Guigou, François Fillon and Jean-Louis Borloo from 1999 to 2005. She joined the regional council of Île-de-France in 2005, and she later became its director of services. She was the president of the Association pour le droit à l'initiative économique (Adie), an employment organization, from 2011 to 2017.

In May 2017, Barbaroux became the acting president of En Marche!.

== Personal life ==
Barbaroux is married, with two children.
