= Alpes-de-Haute-Provence's 2nd constituency =

Constituency of the National Assembly of France

2nd constituency of Alpes-de-Haute-Provence
- inline Constituency of the National Assembly of France

- Map of the constituency in the department

- Alpes-de-Haute-Provence in metropolitan France
- Deputy: Sophie Vaginay-Ricourt; LR (UXD)
- Department: Alpes-de-Haute-Provence
- Cantons: Barcelonnette, Forcalquier, Manosque-1, Manosque-2, Manosque-3, Oraison, Reillanne, Seyne, Sisteron
- Registered voters: 81,381

The 2nd constituency of Alpes-de-Haute-Provence is a French legislative constituency in the southeastern Alpes-de-Haute-Provence department. Like all constituencies, it elects one deputy via the two-round voting system.

Since 2022, its deputy has been Léo Walter of La France Insoumise (LFI). Walter unseated outgoing deputy Christophe Castaner of La République En Marche! (LREM), who served as Minister of the Interior from 2018 to 2020 under Prime Minister Édouard Philippe.

== Members elected ==
| Election | Member | Party | Vote in 2nd round | Runner-up |
|---|---|---|---|---|
| 1958 | Gabriel Domenech | MRP | | |
| 1962 | Claude Delorme | SFIO | | |
| 1967 | Claude Delorme | SFIO | | |
| 1968 | Claude Delorme | PS | | |
| 1973 | Claude Delorme | PS | | |
| 1978 | Pierre Girardot | PCF | | |
| 1981 | André Bellon | PS | | |
| 1986 | proportional representation by department list of deputies | | | |
| 1988 | André Bellon | PS | 51.5% | RPR |
| 1993 | Pierre Delmar | RPR | 72.4% | FN |
| 1997 | Robert Honde | PRG | 50.4% | RPR |
| 2002 | Daniel Spagnou | UMP | 59.9% | PRG |
| 2007 | Daniel Spagnou | UMP | 54.0% | PS |
| 2012 | Christophe Castaner | PS | 54.0% | UMP |
| 2017 | Christophe Castaner | LREM | 61.6% | LFI |
| 2017 | Emmanuelle Fontaine-Domeizel (Note: Substitute for Christophe Castaner, appointed Secretary of State for Relations with Parliament) | LREM | | |
| 2020 | Christophe Castaner | LREM | | |
| 2022 | Léo Walter | LFI | 51.48% | LREM |
| 2024 | Sophie Vaginay-Ricourt | NR | 50.97% | LFI |

== Election results ==
=== 2024 ===
| Candidate | Party | Alliance | First round | | Second round | |
| Candidate | Party | Alliance | Votes | % | Votes | % |
|---|---|---|---|---|---|---|
| Sophie Vaginay | RN | | 18,314 | 40.89 | 21,655 | 50.97 |
| Léo Walter | LFI | NFP | 14,774 | 32.99 | 20,834 | 49.03 |
| Dominique Blanc | REN | Ensemble | 10,162 | 22.69 | | |
| Myriam Cadenel | REC | | 585 | 1.31 | | |
| Loan Reynaud | DVD | | 512 | 1.14 | | |
| Henri Cyvoct | LO | | 438 | 0.99 | | |
| Valid votes | | | 44,785 | 96.19 | 42,489 | 90.60 |
| Blank votes | | | 1,295 | 2.78 | 3,464 | 7.39 |
| Null votes | | | 480 | 1.03 | 944 | 2.01 |
| Turnout | | | 46,560 | 69.84 | 46,897 | 70.34 |
| Abstentions | | | 20,111 | 30.16 | 19,777 | 29.66 |
| Registered voters | | | 66,671 | | 66,674 | |
| Result | | | NE GAIN | | | |

=== 2022 ===
Legislative Election 2022: Alpes-de-Haute-Provence's 2nd constituency
| Party | Candidate | Votes | % | ±% |
|---|---|---|---|---|
| LREM (Ensemble) | Christophe Castaner | 10,232 | 30.16 | -13.88 |
| LFI (NUPÉS) | Léo Walter | 9,940 | 29.30 | +10.17 |
| RN | Aurélie Abeille | 7,906 | 23.31 | +9.73 |
| REC | Myriam Cadenel | 1,435 | 4.23 | N/A |
| UDI (UDC) | Marie Ferreira | 1,288 | 3.80 | −0.81 |
| DVE | Clémence Razeau | 781 | 2.30 | −0.01 |
| Others | N/A | 2,342 | 6.90 | |
| Turnout | | 33,924 | 52.21 | −0.95 |
2nd round result
| LFI (NUPÉS) | Léo Walter | 16,063 | 51.48 | +13.05 |
| LREM (Ensemble) | Christophe Castaner | 15,137 | 48.52 | −13.05 |
| Turnout | | 31,200 | 51.80 | +6.05 |
| LFI gain from LREM | | | | |

=== 2017 ===
| Candidate | Label | First round | | Second round | |
| Candidate | Label | Votes | % | Votes | % |
|---|---|---|---|---|---|
| Christophe Castaner | REM | 14,957 | 44.04 | 16,412 | 61.57 |
| Léo Walter | FI | 5,622 | 16.55 | 10,244 | 38.43 |
| Christian Girard | FN | 4,611 | 13.58 | | |
| Jean-Claude Castel | DVD | 3,861 | 11.37 | | |
| Sébastien Ginet | LR | 1,565 | 4.61 | | |
| Isabelle Thibault | PCF | 877 | 2.58 | | |
| Claudine Razeau | ECO | 786 | 2.31 | | |
| Noël Chuisano | DLF | 534 | 1.57 | | |
| Christine Cypriani-Mouton | DVG | 378 | 1.11 | | |
| Nathalie Hue-Courtin | DIV | 316 | 0.93 | | |
| Christophe Bravard | DIV | 236 | 0.69 | | |
| Henri Cyvoct | EXG | 218 | 0.64 | | |
| Votes | | 33,961 | 100.00 | 26,656 | 100.00 |
| Valid votes | | 33,961 | 97.79 | 26,656 | 89.19 |
| Blank votes | | 525 | 1.51 | 2,174 | 7.27 |
| Null votes | | 241 | 0.69 | 1,057 | 3.54 |
| Turnout | | 34,727 | 53.16 | 29,887 | 45.75 |
| Abstentions | | 30,599 | 46.84 | 35,440 | 54.25 |
| Registered voters | | 65,326 | | 65,327 | |
Source: Ministry of the Interior

=== 2012 ===
Summary of the 10 June and 17 June 2012 French legislative in Alpes-de-Haute-Provence's 2nd Constituency election results
| Candidate | Party | | 1st round | | 2nd round | |
| Candidate | Party | | Votes | % | Votes | % |
|---|---|---|---|---|---|---|
| Christophe Castaner | Socialist Party | PS | 13,872 | 35.76% | 20,411 | 54.04% |
| Jean-Claude Castel | Union for a Popular Movement | UMP | 11,549 | 29.77% | 17,357 | 45.96% |
| Jean-Claude Diedrich | National Front | FN | 5,915 | 15.25% | | |
| Martine Carriol | Left Front | FG | 3,635 | 9.37% | | |
| Catherine Berthonneche | The Greens | VEC | 1,702 | 4.39% | | |
| Isabelle Verschueren | | CEN | 627 | 1.62% | | |
| Yamina Guebli | Ecologist | ECO | 327 | 0.84% | | |
| Bruno Morin | | NCE | 317 | 0.82% | | |
| Noël Chuisano | Miscellaneous Right | DVD | 315 | 0.81% | | |
| Jean-Michel Rovida | Centrist Alliance | ALLI | 220 | 0.57% | | |
| Brigitte Picard | Far Left | EXG | 179 | 0.46% | | |
| Cyril Belmonte | Far Left | EXG | 138 | 0.36% | | |
| Total | | | 38,796 | 100% | 37,768 | 100% |
| Registered voters | | | 63,327 | | 63,340 | |
| Blank/Void ballots | | | 605 | 1.54% | 1,292 | 3.31% |
| Turnout | | | 39,401 | 62.22% | 39,060 | 61.67% |
| Abstentions | | | 23,926 | 37.78% | 24,280 | 38.33% |
| Result | | | | | PS GAIN | |

=== 2007 ===
Summary of the 10 June and 17 June 2007 French legislative in Alpes-de-Haute-Provence's 2nd Constituency election results
| Candidate | Party | | 1st round | | 2nd round | |
| Candidate | Party | | Votes | % | Votes | % |
|---|---|---|---|---|---|---|
| Daniel Spagnou | Union for a Popular Movement | UMP | 18,249 | 46.25% | 20,905 | 53.96% |
| Christophe Castaner | Socialist Party | PS | 11,232 | 28.46% | 17,840 | 46.04% |
| Isabelle Verschueren | Democratic Movement | MoDem | 2,269 | 5.75% | | |
| Jean-Claude Cauvin | Communist | COM | 1,789 | 4.53% | | |
| Mireille D'Ornano | National Front | FN | 1,702 | 4.31% | | |
| Patrick Garnon | The Greens | VEC | 1,125 | 2.85% | | |
| Karine Denko | Far Left | EXG | 825 | 2.09% | | |
| Gilles Ravera | Hunting, Fishing, Nature, Traditions | CPNT | 629 | 1.59% | | |
| Jeannine Douzon | Movement for France | MPF | 426 | 1.08% | | |
| Véronique Raphel | Ecologist | ECO | 385 | 0.98% | | |
| Xavier Dejasmin | Divers | DIV | 320 | 0.81% | | |
| Michèle Chassaing | Far Right | EXD | 178 | 0.45% | | |
| Max Illy | Far Left | EXG | 176 | 0.45% | | |
| Claude Senes | Far Left | EXG | 156 | 0.40% | | |
| Total | | | 39,461 | 100% | 38,745 | 100% |
| Registered voters | | | 60,866 | | 60,861 | |
| Blank/Void ballots | | | 671 | 1.67% | 1,181 | 2.96% |
| Turnout | | | 40,132 | 65.94% | 39,926 | 65.60% |
| Abstentions | | | 20,734 | 34.06% | 20,935 | 34.40% |
| Result | | | | | UMP HOLD | |

=== 2002 ===
Legislative Election 2002: Alpes-de-Haute-Provence's 2nd constituency
| Party | Candidate | Votes | % | ±% |
|---|---|---|---|---|
| UMP | Daniel Spagnou | 15,072 | 40.41 | |
| PRG | Robert Honde | 8,388 | 22.49 | |
| FN | Remy le Cardinal | 3,931 | 10.54 | |
| PCF | Tannick Philipponneau | 2,752 | 7.38 | |
| CPNT | Christian Pesce | 1,359 | 3.64 | |
| LV | Patricia Starek | 1,213 | 3.25 | |
| UDF | Claude Laugier | 1,003 | 2.69 | |
| LCR | Gerard Guieu | 758 | 2.03 | |
| MNR | Mireille d'Ornano | 750 | 2.01 | |
| Others | N/A | 2,076 | | |
| Turnout | | 38,166 | 68.88 | |
2nd round result
| UMP | Daniel Spagnou | 20,402 | 59.91 | |
| PRG | Robert Honde | 13,654 | 40.09 | |
| Turnout | | 35,959 | 64.91 | |
| UMP gain from PRG | | | | |

=== 1997 ===
Legislative Election 1997: Alpes-de-Haute-Provence's 2nd constituency
| Party | Candidate | Votes | % | ±% |
|---|---|---|---|---|
| RPR | Pierre Delmar | 10,363 | 30.37 | |
| PRG | Robert Honde | 8,330 | 24.41 | |
| FN | Mireille d'Ornano | 5,671 | 16.62 | |
| PCF | Raymond Bressand | 4,823 | 14.13 | |
| MPF | Marie-Christine Brun-Bourlier | 1,474 | 4.32 | |
| DVE | Antoine Labeyrie | 1,379 | 4.04 | |
| Others | N/A | 2,081 | | |
| Turnout | | 36,021 | 69.56 | |
2nd round result
| PRG | Robert Honde | 18,062 | 50.40 | |
| RPR | Pierre Delmar | 17,772 | 49.60 | |
| Turnout | | 38,624 | 74.61 | |
| PRG gain from RPR | | | | |

== Sources ==
- Official results of French elections from 1998: "Résultats électoraux officiels en France" (in French). Archived from the original on 20 December 2011.
