= Killing of Cédric Chouviat =

2020 death of an arrested man in Paris

- Cédric Chouviat in 2020
- Date: January 5, 2020; 6 years ago
- Time: c. 10:00 AM (UTC+1) police killing
- Participants: Parisian police officers
- Outcome: Nationwide prohibition of chokeholding.
- Deaths: Cédric Chouviat
- Charges: Manslaughter

On January 5, 2020, Cédric Chouviat (French pronunciation: [sedʁik ʃuvja]), a 42-year-old French delivery man, died after his arrest by Parisian police after using his cellphone while on his scooter and contempt of a police officer. A coroner later ruled that he had died of asphyxia and a broken larynx. During the arrest, after Chouviat called one of the officers "a fool" and an officer went behind him and locked his arm around Chouviat's neck causing him to fall to the ground. While on the ground officers continued to restrain him and handcuffed him, during which he suffered a heart attack and was administered aid after officers noticed his skin turning blue.

== Incident ==
Police reportedly stopped Chouviat, as it appeared that Chouviat was using his cell phone while driving his mobile scooter, near the Eiffel Tower on January 3. In one of the videos Chouviat, can be heard mocking the police officers who stopped him by calling them "clowns" and stating that "without your uniform, in the street you are nothing at all". His comments caused the officers to insult and mock Chouviat with one officer threatens to arrest Chouviat for insulting the officers, while another is recorded shoving Chouviat multiple times.

Once the officers arrest Chouviat, they reportedly used a chokehold to subdue him with three other officers pinning him to the ground while Chouviat was wearing his motorcycle helmet. During the arrest, Chouviat is recorded as stating "Stop", "I'm Stopping" and stating "I'm suffocating" seven times. A later investigation found that Chouviat had stated "I'm suffocating" nine times in 13 seconds prior to losing consciousness. The incident was documented in at least thirteen different videos that were filmed by Chouviat, bystanders and one of the officers involved in the arrest.

Chouviat died two days after being subdued by police at a local hospital, with a coroner ruling that he had died of asphyxia and a broken larynx.

== Investigation and legal ==
On January 7, 2020 the Paris Public Prosecutor opened a judicial inquiry for involuntary manslaughter, and the organization that investigates the police also opened an investigation into the death. A lawyer for two of the officers involved in the arrest claims that the motorcycle helmet worn by Chouviat muffled his voice enough that they did not hear his comments and when shown the videos, the officers were "surprised and devastated" by the audio. During the investigation, none of the involved officers were suspended.

It was announced in January 2025, that three of the officers involved in Chouviat's death would be tried in Paris for involuntary homicide, following an investigation which found that officers had shown "inappropriate, negligent and imprudent behaviour" during his arrest. However, by April 2026 no hearing date had been scheduled in response to the announcement.

In April 2026, it was reported that the family of Chouviat were seeking to hold the French government liable for his death following a comment by French rights ombudswoman Claire Hédon who stated that French police had used "disproportionate force". With their claim the family wanted to highlight the lack of international sanctions or disciplinary proceedings against the officers involved.

== Response ==
Lawyers for the Chouviat family released statements at a press conference, calling for the public to maintain calm and that "France isn't the United States, but France is becoming like the United States." The lawyers highlighted the main concern is the techniques that were used by police on Chouviat that caused his death. His family have called for the ban on the use of chokeholds by French police and have compared his death to the murder of George Floyd, with his widow stating; "You have a citizen who's asking to live and is a victim of injustice and violence to the point of losing his life. Its copy-paste."

The death of Chouviat was specifically referenced by French Interior Minister Christophe Castaner when he announced a ban on the use of chokeholds during police arrests in early June 2020, but after a string of protests from French police the ban was removed weeks later.

The death of Chouviat bore many similarities to that of George Floyd a few months later in Minneapolis, Minnesota USA. However, unlike in the Floyd case there has been little protest or publicity.
