= Michèle Victory =

French politician

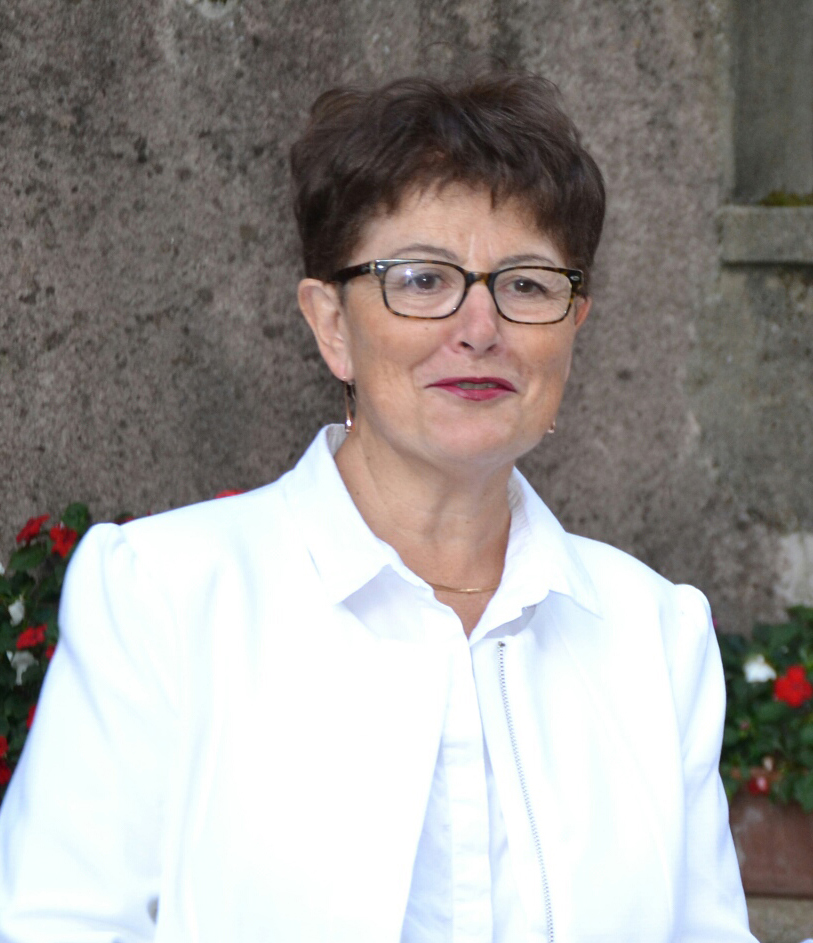

Member of the French National Assembly for Ardèche's 2nd constituency
- In office 25 December 2017 – 21 June 2022
- Preceded by: Olivier Dussopt
- Succeeded by: Olivier Dussopt

Personal details
- Born: 1958 (age 67–68) Annaba (then Bône), French Algeria
- Party: Socialist Party
- Profession: Teacher

Michèle Victory (French pronunciation: [miʃɛl viktɔʁi]; born 28 October 1958) is a French politician for the Socialist Party who served as a member of the French National Assembly for Ardèche's 2nd constituency. She was a substitute candidate at first in 2007 and later became a member of the assembly in December 2017 after her predecessor Olivier Dussopt had joined the government as a Secretary of State in the Ministry of Public Action and Accounts. Victory is an English teacher by profession and became involved in local politics in 1995.

On 9 March 2020, during the COVID-19 pandemic, she tested positive for the virus.
