= Christophe Castaner =

French lawyer and politician (born 1966)

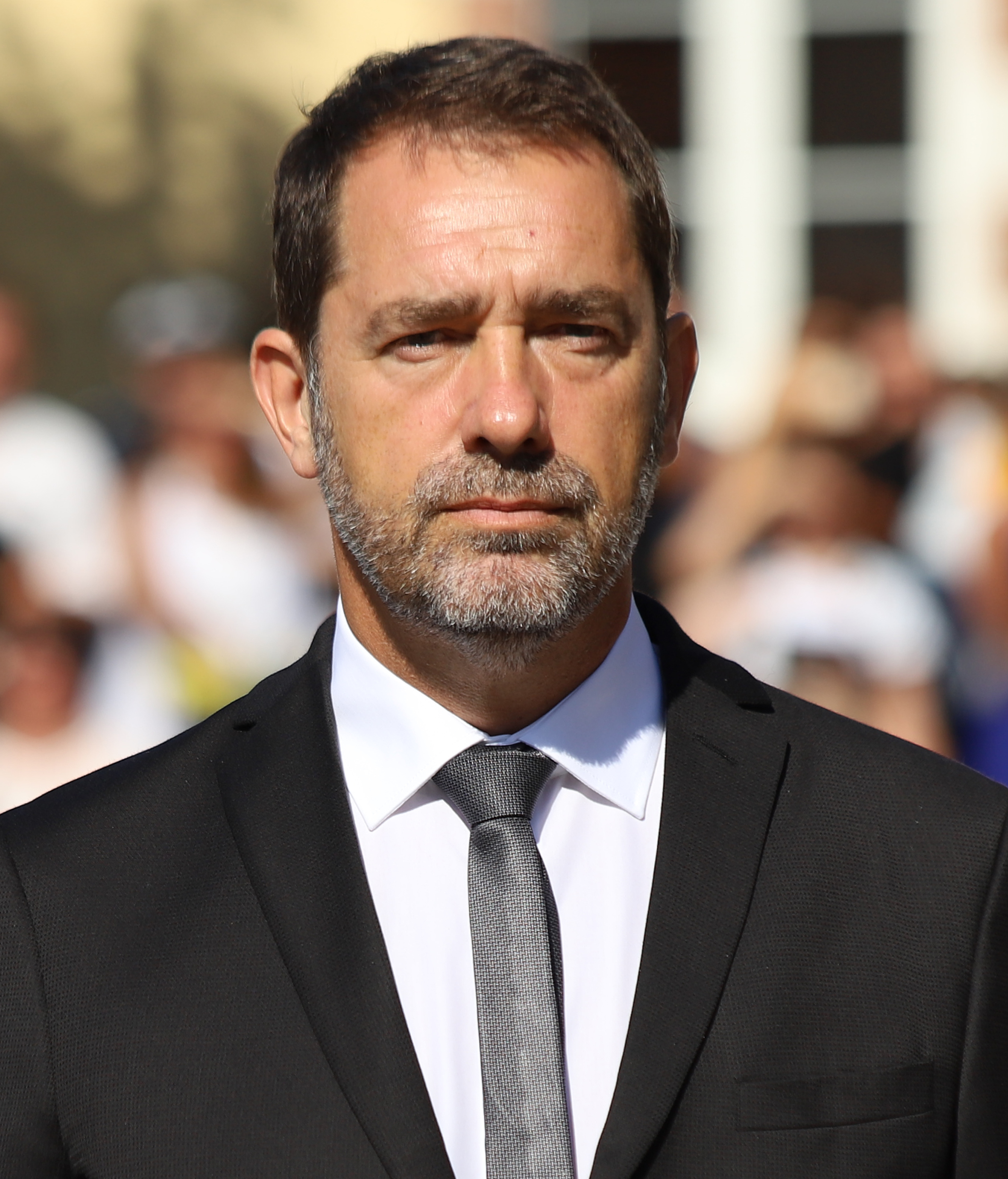
- Castaner in 2019

President of the La République En Marche group in the National Assembly
- In office 10 September 2020 – 21 June 2022
- Preceded by: Gilles Le Gendre
- Succeeded by: Aurore Bergé

Minister of the Interior
- In office 16 October 2018 – 6 July 2020
- Prime Minister: Édouard Philippe
- Preceded by: Édouard Philippe
- Succeeded by: Gérald Darmanin

Executive Officer of La République En Marche!
- In office 18 November 2017 – 16 October 2018
- Preceded by: Catherine Barbaroux (Acting)
- Succeeded by: Stanislas Guerini

Secretary of State for Relations with Parliament
- In office 17 May 2017 – 16 October 2018
- Prime Minister: Édouard Philippe
- Preceded by: André Vallini
- Succeeded by: Marc Fesneau

Government Spokesperson
- In office 17 May 2017 – 24 November 2017
- Prime Minister: Édouard Philippe
- Preceded by: Stéphane Le Foll
- Succeeded by: Benjamin Griveaux

Member of the National Assembly for Alpes-de-Haute-Provence's 2nd constituency
- In office 4 August 2020 – 21 June 2022
- Preceded by: Emmanuelle Fontaine-Domeizel
- Succeeded by: Léo Walter
- In office 21 June 2017 – 21 July 2017
- Preceded by: Esther Baron
- Succeeded by: Emmanuelle Fontaine-Domeizel
- In office 20 June 2012 – 17 June 2017
- Preceded by: Daniel Spagnou
- Succeeded by: Esther Baron

Mayor of Forcalquier
- In office 23 March 2001 – 22 July 2017
- Preceded by: Gérard Avril
- Succeeded by: Pierre Delmar

Personal details
- Born: Christophe Jean Franck Castaner; 3 January 1966 (age 60) Ollioules, France
- Party: Renaissance (2016–present)
- Other political affiliations: Socialist Party (before 2016)
- Education: Aix-Marseille University
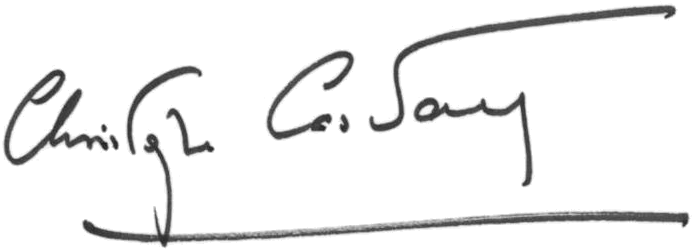
- Signature

Christophe Jean Franck Castaner ([kʁistɔf kastanɛʁ]; born 3 January 1966) is a French politician who served as Minister of the Interior from 16 October 2018 to 6 July 2020 under President Emmanuel Macron. He had been elected in 2017 for a three-year term as chairman (délégué général) of the La République En Marche! (LREM) party with Macron's support. Castaner was Government Spokesperson under Prime Minister Édouard Philippe in 2017 and Secretary of State for Relations with Parliament from 2017 to 2018. He was also Macron's 2017 presidential campaign spokesman.

Born in Ollioules in the Var department in the Provence-Alpes-Côte d'Azur region, Castaner was Mayor of Forcalquier from 2001 to 2017. He held a vice presidency of the Regional Council of Provence-Alpes-Côte d'Azur from 2004 to 2012 under the presidency of Michel Vauzelle, before he represented the 2nd constituency of the Alpes-de-Haute-Provence department in the National Assembly from 2012 to 2017. He headed the Socialist Party list in the 2015 regional election in Provence-Alpes-Côte d'Azur, which saw the party lose all representation at the regional level. He joined Macron's En Marche (later LREM) movement in 2016; he became its chairman the following year after a few months as Government Spokesperson.

In 2018, Castaner was appointed as Minister of the Interior following the resignation of Gérard Collomb. His tenure, which was marked by the yellow vests movement, was heavily criticised for its scenes of police brutality, as well as a series of controversial public statements he made. While France was battling the COVID-19 pandemic and demonstrations had been banned, he allowed a Black Lives Matter protest to take place, attracting further criticism. The following month, he was succeeded by Gérald Darmanin in government and returned to the National Assembly where he would succeed Gilles Le Gendre as La République En Marche group president. In the 2022 legislative election, he lost his seat to Léo Walter of La France Insoumise (FI).

== Early life and education ==
The youngest of three children, Christophe Castaner's father was in the military and his mother was a housewife.

A poor student, he gained his baccalauréat independently (en candidat libre) in 1986. A graduate of Law and Political Science at the University of Aix-Marseille, Castaner holds a post-graduate diploma in International Business Law and a diploma in Criminal and Criminological Sciences.

== Political career ==
After work experience at the Banque Nationale de Paris (BNP) legal department, he was recruited to local government management posts in Avignon and Paris. In 1995 he became office manager for Tony Dreyfus, Mayor of the 10th arrondissement of Paris.

He was technical adviser to Minister of Culture Catherine Trautmann in 1997 and became her principal private secretary in 1998. He was principal private secretary to Michel Sapin, then Minister of the Civil Service and State Reform, from 2000 to 2002.

=== Local government ===
In 2001, Christophe Castaner stood for mayor of Forcalquier. He won against incumbent Pierre Delmar, a member of the Rally for the Republic who had been mayor from 1983 to 1989 and again since 1995. Delmar also served as both a member of the National Assembly and a departmental councillor.

Reelected as Mayor of Forcalquier and president of the district council of Forcalquier-Mount Lure (Communauté de communes Pays de Forcalquier - Montagne de Lure) in 2008, he was an active participant in the creation of the intercommunality of the Pays de Haute-Provence.

He was once again reelected Mayor of Forcalquier on 23 March 2014 by 22 votes, standing against Sébastien Ginet of the Union for a Popular Movement (UMP). On 11 April 2014, his deputy Pierre Garcin succeeded him as the president of the district council of Forcalquier-Mount Lure.

=== Regional government ===
In 2004, after having been elected to the Regional Council of Provence-Alpes-Côte d'Azur, Castaner was tasked by Regional Council President Michel Vauzelle with land use planning. It was the first time this duty fell to an "Alpine" representative, who was also the youngest vice president of the regional council. He was reelected as a regional councillor in 2010 and given a new portfolio: employment, economy, higher education and innovation.

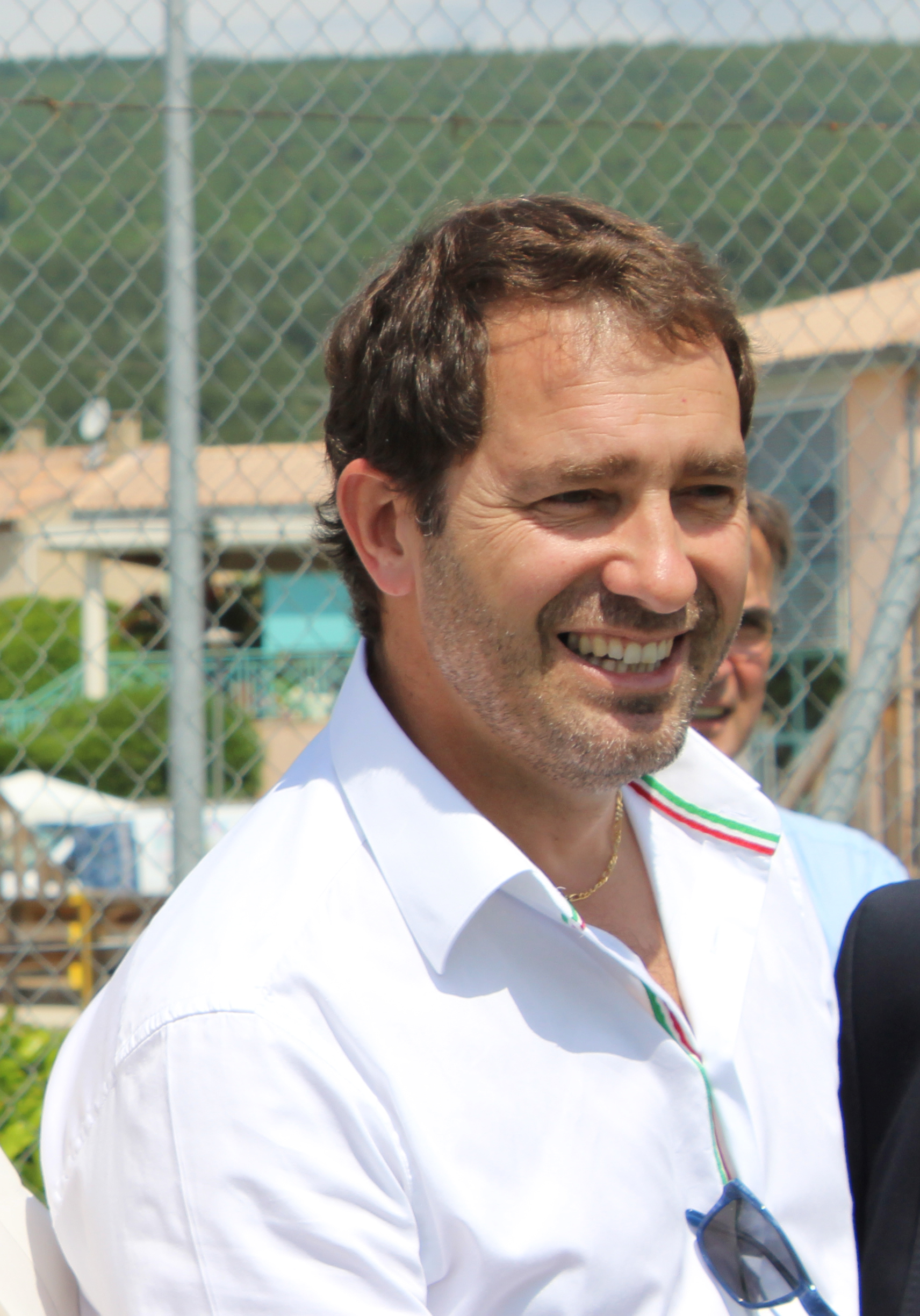
Castaner in 2013

Castaner was named on 5 February 2015 as lead candidate in the upcoming Provence-Alpes-Côte d'Azur regional election by members of the Socialist Party with 55% of the vote, ahead of Patrick Allemand (31%) and Elsa di Méo (14%). In the first round he obtained 17% of the vote, trailing the record-breaking National Front (40.6%) led by Marion Maréchal-Le Pen and The Republicans (26.5%) led by Christian Estrosi. Following the call of the Socialist Party's national leadership, Christophe Castaner decided not to stand in the second round in an act of unity against the National Front. This choice enabled the election of Estrosi of The Republicans to the presidency of the regional council with 54.8% of the vote in the second round, but meant the Socialist Party would lose all representation in the regional council.

=== National politics ===
==== Deputy for Alpes-de-Haute-Provence ====
On 17 June 2012, Castaner was elected as a deputy (or MP) to the National Assembly for the 2nd constituency of the Alpes-de-Haute-Provence department in the 2012 legislative election, ahead of the UMP candidate, Jean-Claude Castel, Mayor of Corbières.

A member of the National Assembly's Finance Committee, in July 2012 Castaner was appointed Special Rapporteur of Work and Employment Budgets. On 20 June 2014, Prime Minister Manuel Valls entrusted him with the vice presidency of the Council for the Co-ordination of Profit-sharing, Employee Savings and Employee Shareholding (Conseil d'orientation de la participation, de l'intéressement, de l'épargne salariale et de l'actionnariat salarié — COPIESAS). This authority was in charge of bringing negotiations between unions and management on these measures to a successful conclusion.

Castaner is considered to be one of Macron's earliest backers. He sponsored the Bill for Growth, Activity and Equality of Economic Opportunity (Loi pour la croissance, l'activité et l'égalité des chances économiques), known as the loi Macron ("Macron law"). He was spokesperson for and a supporter of Emmanuel Macron during the campaign for the presidential election of 2017. During this campaign, he was repeatedly criticised for his perceived dishonesty and tactlessness.

Castaner justified his joining with Emmanuel Macron by explaining that in politics one must be "at the right place at the right time, without necessarily knowing where you will end up". Described as ambitious, he reckons that "all politicians have an ego. Or they are liars. Recently, I downloaded La Provence at 5 a.m. to see if my picture was in that day's edition". He stood in the 2017 legislative election on the La République En Marche! ticket for the 2nd constituency of the Alpes-de-Hautes-Provence and was reelected.

==== Government Spokesperson and Secretary of State for Relations with Parliament ====
On 17 May 2017, Castaner was named Secretary of State for Relations with Parliament. He was also appointed as Government Spokesperson for the Édouard Philippe government.

In October 2017, after the arrest of several far-right activists, he was named among potential targets of attacks in preparation. La France Insoumise leader Jean-Luc Mélenchon was also included among the targets. The acute risk of an attack was denied by then Minister of the Interior Gérard Collomb shortly thereafter.

==== Leader of La République En Marche! ====
On 25 October 2017, a few days after Emmanuel Macron gave him his support, Castaner he declared his candidacy for the chairmanship of the La République En Marche party on RTL. He was elected at the first party convention on 18 November 2017. In his capacity as chairman, he spearheaded Macron's efforts to forge alliances with like-minded parties across Europe ahead of the 2019 European Parliament election.

==== Minister of the Interior ====
Following Gerard Collomb's resignation as Interior Minister for the Édouard Philippe government in early October 2018, Castaner was appointed Interior Minister on 16 October 2018 following an acting period by Philippe. A brief handover ceremony at the Interior Ministry was held the same day; Castaner spoke to journalists citing the issue of security as the ministry's greatest preoccupation, mentioning the "fight against terrorism". In the evening, President Macron addressed the French nation in a televised broadcast, in which he announced the appointment of the new Interior Minister and Agriculture Minister over a 12-minute-long speech.

During his tenure, Castaner faced the 2018 Strasbourg attack, 2019 Lyon bombing, 2019 Paris police headquarters stabbing and 2020 Romans-sur-Isère knife attack, perpetrated by Islamic terrorists.

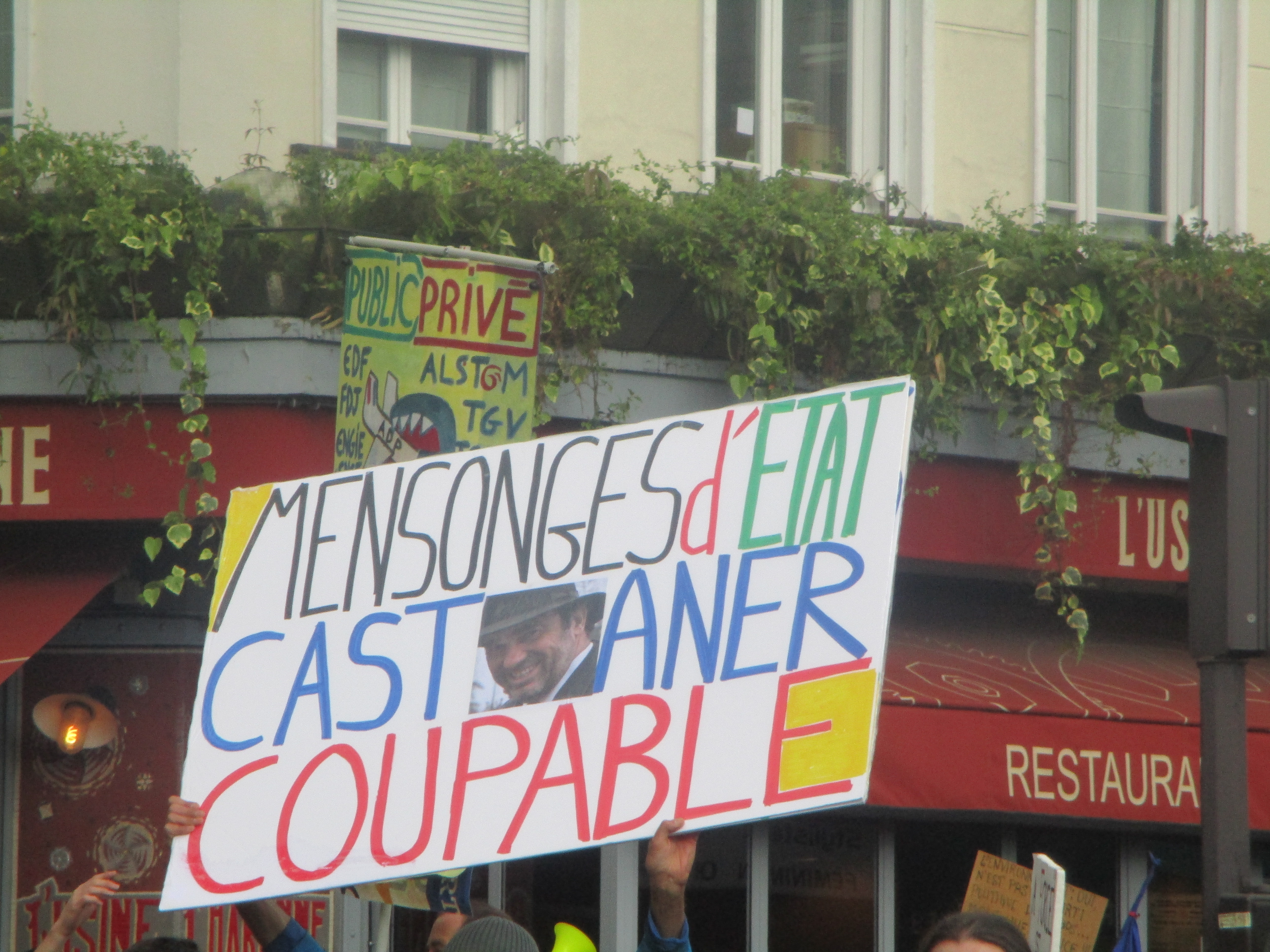
Yellow vest demonstrator holding a sign against Castaner during a protest in May 2019

In late 2018 and early 2019, Castaner was criticised for his handling of the yellow vests movement. Numerous scenes of police brutality were shown in international media. In June 2020, in the aftermath of the yellow vests movement and the death of Cédric Chouviat in early 2020, he announced that chokeholds would no longer be taught in police academies in France as an arrest technique.

On 9 March 2019, after a day of yellow vests demonstrations, Castaner, a married man, was photographed in a nightclub in Paris with an unknown young woman. The scene caused embarrassment for the Philippe government.

In 2019, he was heard by the Senate amid the Benalla affair.

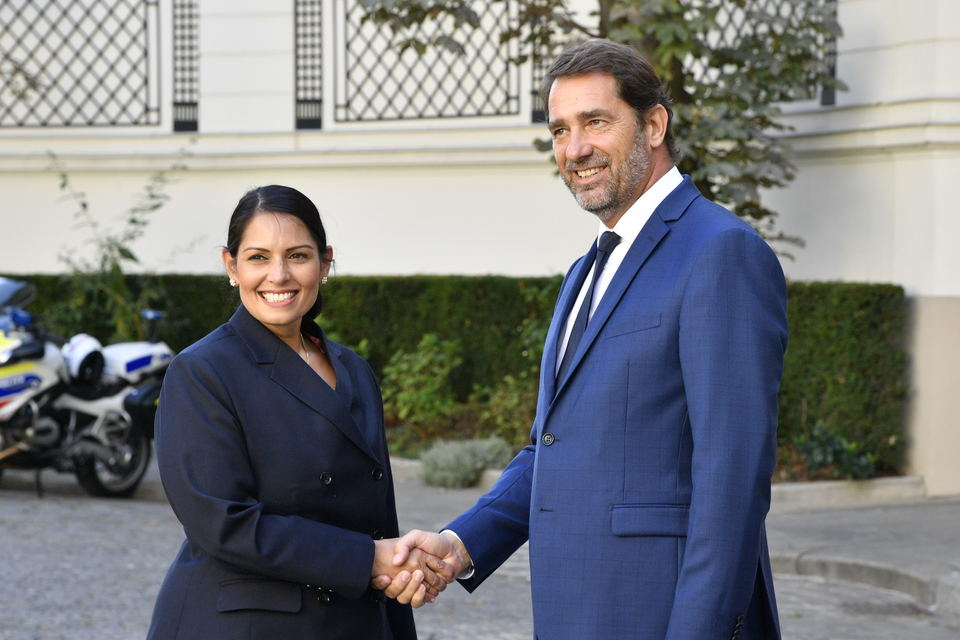
Christophe Castaner and UK Home Secretary Priti Patel in 2019

On 1 May 2019, during Labour Day demonstrations, Castaner announced an "attack" of the Pitié-Salpêtrière Hospital in Paris by demonstrators, as well as the aggression of the nursing staff and a policeman. Videos and testimonies published the next day revealed that what he presented as an attack was in fact demonstrators trying to escape from police, who charged to disperse rioters. Criticised by journalists and several opposition politicians, he was accused of lying and recognised that he should not have used the term "attack".

In July 2019, Castaner was again criticised for decorating five police officers who were the subject of a police brutality investigation.

In the aftermath of the Paris police headquarters stabbing in October 2019, Castaner was criticised for the public statements he had made regarding the motive of the attacker. Castaner had claimed that there were no warning signs prior to the attack in the suspect's behavior, while records dating back to 2015 documented several alerts and reports concerning a possible Islamic radicalisation. The Republicans spokesman Christian Jacob called for an official inquiry, while other MPs demanded Castaner's resignation.

In June 2020, Castaner announced a Black Lives Matter demonstration in Paris would be authorised to proceed despite a decree signed by the Prime Minister banning demonstrations as a result of the COVID-19 pandemic in France and although he had stated the week prior "gatherings were prohibited" in order to slow the spread of the virus. He was quoted saying about the fight against racism following the murder of George Floyd in the United States: "I believe that the global emotion, which is a healthy emotion on this subject, goes beyond the legal rules that apply".

In July 2020, Castaner was sacked and replaced as Interior Minister by Budget Minister colleague Gérald Darmanin in the new Castex government. BFM TV published as a headline: "Christophe Castaner replaced by Gérald Darmanin after two years of controversies". He later returned to the National Assembly.

==== President of the La République En Marche group in the National Assembly ====
On 10 September 2020, Castaner succeeded Gilles Le Gendre as president of the La République En Marche group in the National Assembly.

Castaner was defeated in the second round of the 2022 French legislative election by Léo Walter of La France Insoumise and subsequently lost the seat he held since 2012.

== Other activities ==
- Shein, Member of the Regional Strategic and Corporate Responsibility Committee for Europe, Africa and the Middle East (since 2024)
- Autoroutes et tunnel du Mont-Blanc (ATMB), chair of the Board of Directors (since 2022)
- Marseille-Fos Port, chair of the supervisory board (since 2022)

== Political positions ==
In October 2020, Castaner was one of 48 LREM members who voted in support of a bill introduced by the Ecology Democracy Solidarity parliamentary group that would extend the legal deadline for abortion from 12 to 14 weeks.

== Honours ==
- Knight of the Legion of Honour (2022)

== Summary of elected positions ==
=== Local ===
18 March 2001 – 22 July 2017: Mayor of Forcalquier.

18 March 2001 – 4 July 2020: municipal councillor, Forcalquier.

1 January 2003 – 12 April 2014: President of the District Council of Forcalquier-Mount Lure.

28 March 2004 – 13 July 2012: Vice President of the Regional Council of Provence-Alpes-Côte d'Azur.

=== National ===
20 June 2012 – 17 June 2017, 21 June 2017 – 21 July 2017: Socialist member of the National Assembly for the 2nd constituency of the Alpes de Haute-Provence. Member of the Finance Committee — Special protractor of Work and Employment Budgets.

17 May 2017 – 24 November 2017: Government Spokesperson.

17 May 2017 – 16 October 2018: Secretary of State for Relations with Parliament.

18 November 2017 – 16 October 2018: Executive Officer of La République En Marche!

16 October 2018 – 6 July 2020: Minister of the Interior.

Political offices
Preceded by Édouard Philippe; Acting	Minister of the Interior; 2018–2020	Succeeded by Gérald Darmanin
