= Vincent Trébuchet =

French politician (born 1988)

Member of the French National Assembly for Ardèche's 2nd constituency
- Incumbent
- Assumed office 18 July 2024
- Preceded by: Olivier Dussopt

Personal details
- Born: 5 July 1988 (age 38)
- Party: Union of the Right for the Republic (2024–present)
- Other political affiliations: The Republicans (2024)

Vincent Trébuchet (born 5 July 1988) is a French politician of the Union of the Right for the Republic (UDR). He was elected member of the National Assembly for Ardèche's 2nd constituency in 2024.

== Early life and career ==
Trébuchet was born on 5 July 1988. He lives in Lalouvesc with his wife and four children, and works as a freelancer in consulting. Having supported The Republicans for a long time, he joined the party "a few days" before his election. He is a supporter of the party's alliance with the National Rally.
