= André Villiers =

French politician

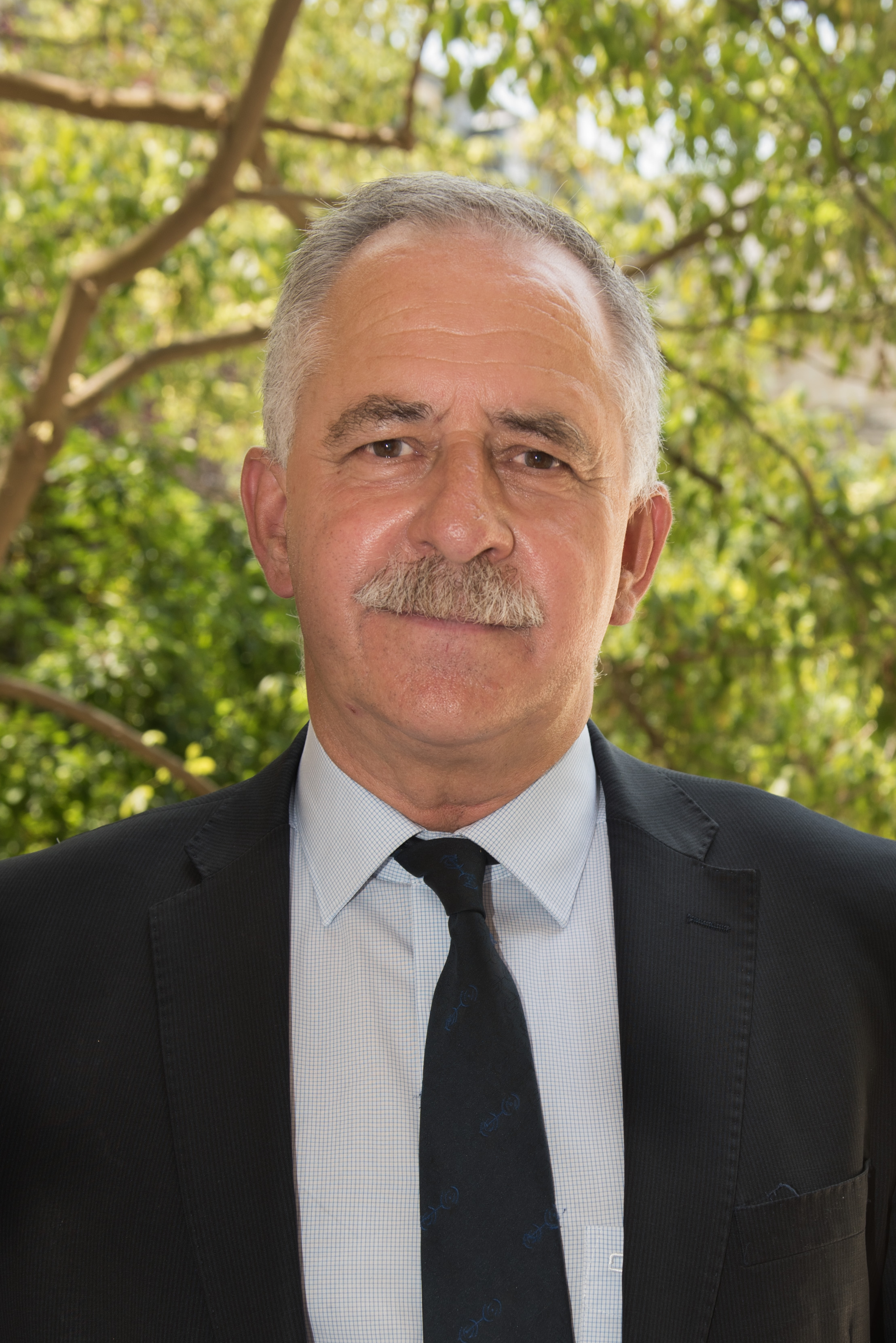

Member of the National Assembly for Yonne's 2nd constituency
- Incumbent
- Assumed office 2017
- Preceded by: Jean-Yves Caullet

Personal details
- Born: 13 December 1954 (age 71) Tharoiseau, France
- Party: Union of Democrats and Independents

André Villiers (born 13 December 1954) is a French politician of the Union of Democrats and Independents (UDI) who has been serving as a member of the French National Assembly since 18 June 2017, representing the second ward of the department of Yonne.

== Political career ==
In 2001, Villiers was elected as the mayor of Pierre-Perthuis, and would remain there until 2008 when he became the mayor of Vézelay under The Centrists. He was also councilor for the Yonne commune from 1992 to 2015.

In parliament, Villiers serves on the Committee on Economic Affairs.

== Political positions ==
Villiers is considered a supporter of President Ilham Aliyev of Azerbaijan.
