= Laurence Heydel Grillere =

French politician (born 1968)

Member of the French National Assembly for Ardèche's 2nd constituency
- In office 23 July 2022 – 11 February 2024
- Preceded by: Olivier Dussopt
- Succeeded by: Olivier Dussopt

Personal details
- Born: 18 November 1968 (age 57)
- Party: Renaissance

Laurence Heydel Grillere (born 18 November 1968) is a French politician. From 2022 to 2024, she was a member of the National Assembly. Since 2023, she has served as leader of Renaissance in Ardèche.
