= Éric Girardin =

French politician

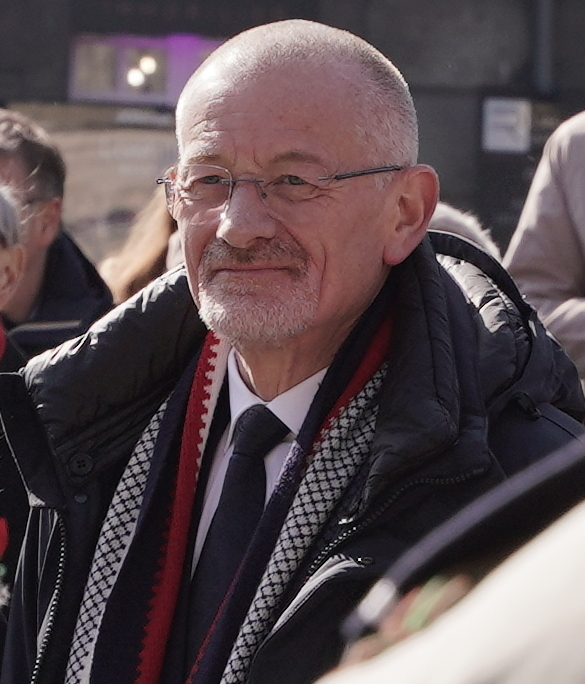
- 2024

Member of the National Assembly for Marne's 3rd constituency
- In office 21 June 2017 – 9 June 2024
- Preceded by: Yves Censi
- Succeeded by: Maxime Michelet

Personal details
- Born: 12 February 1961 (age 65) Sézanne, France
- Party: Renaissance
- Education: Conservatoire national des arts et métiers

Éric Girardin (French pronunciation: [eʁik ʒiʁaʁdɛ̃]; born 12 February 1961) is a French politician of Renaissance (RE) who served as a member of the French National Assembly from 2017 to 2024, representing the department of Marne.

== Political career ==
In parliament, Girardin serves as member of the Committee on Foreign Affairs. In addition to his committee assignments, he is a member of the French-Mexican Parliamentary Friendship Group and the French-German Parliamentary Friendship Group. Since 2019, he has also been a member of the French delegation to the Franco-German Parliamentary Assembly.

== Political positions ==
In July 2019, Girardin decided not to align with his parliamentary group's majority and became one of 52 LREM members who abstained from a vote on the French ratification of the European Union’s Comprehensive Economic and Trade Agreement (CETA) with Canada.

== See also ==
- 2017 French legislative election
