= Maxime Michelet =

French politician

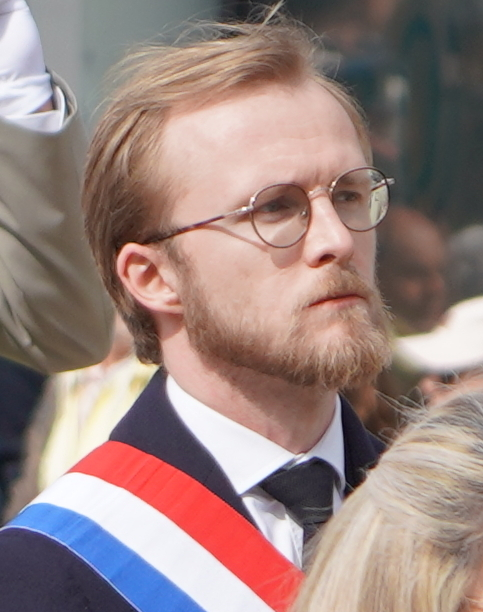
- 2025

Member of the French National Assembly for Marne's 3rd constituency
- Incumbent
- Assumed office 18 July 2024
- Preceded by: Éric Girardin

Personal details
- Born: 19 April 1992 (age 34)
- Party: Union of the Right for the Republic (2024–present)
- Other political affiliations: The Republicans (until 2024)

Maxime Michelet (born 19 April 1992) is a French politician of the Union of the Right for the Republic (UDR) and historian. He was elected member of the National Assembly for Marne's 3rd constituency in 2024.
