= Léo Walter =

French politician

Deputy for Alpes-de-Haute-Provence's 2nd constituency in the National Assembly of France
- In office 22 June 2022 – 9 June 2024
- Preceded by: Christophe Castaner
- Succeeded by: Sophie Vaginay-Ricourt

Personal details
- Born: 14 April 1972 (age 52); Amiens
- Political party: La France Insoumise

Léo Walter (born 14 April 1972 in Amiens) is a French politician from La France Insoumise. He served as the deputy for Alpes-de-Haute-Provence's 2nd constituency in the National Assembly of France from 2022 to 2024.

== Biography ==
Married and father of three children, he lives in Niozelles.

He was a teacher and school principal. After working for seven years in schools in the northern districts of Marseille, he moved to Alpes-de-Haute-Provence, where he was director of the Revest-du-Bion school, which had two classes, one primary, which he taught, and a kindergarten. He is a member of the SNUipp union.

He is the brother of Emmanuelle Walter, editor-in-chief of the website Arrêt sur images.
