= Saur (company) =

French company

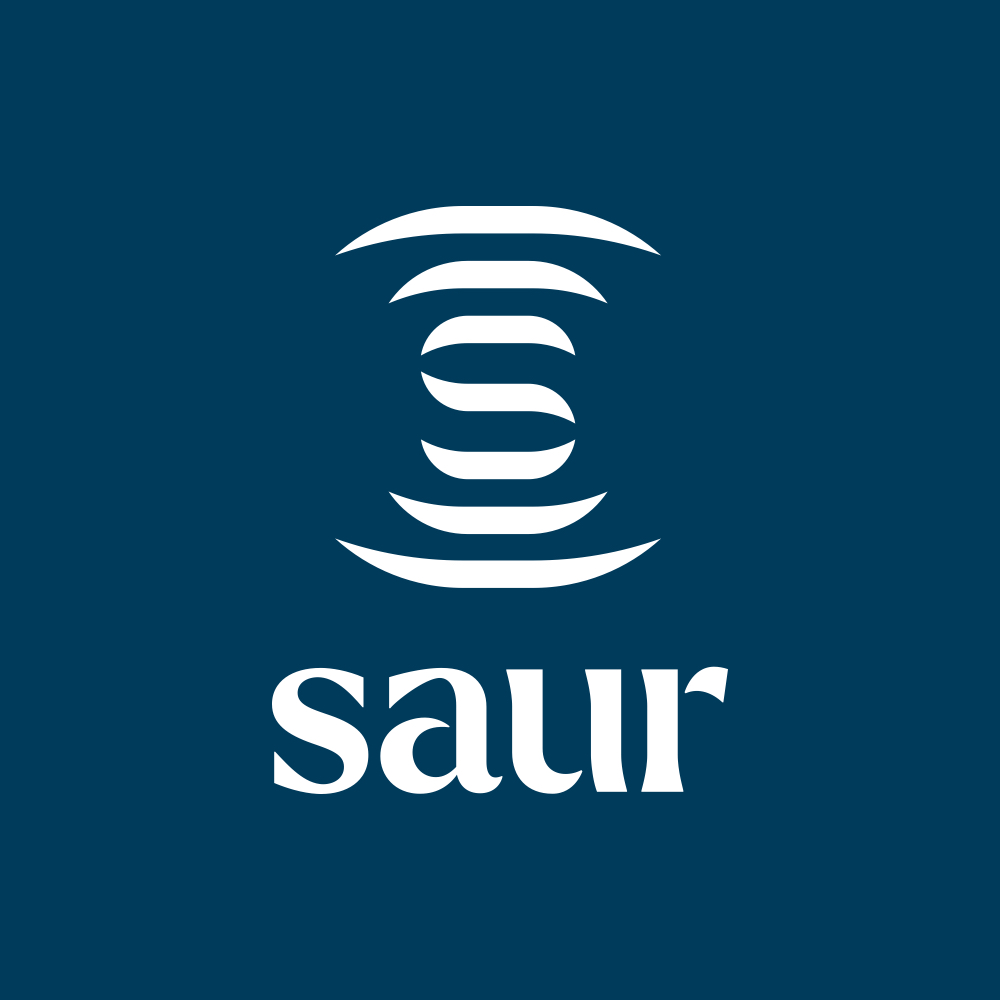
- Company type: Public
- Industry: Environmental services
- Founded: 1933
- Founder: Pierre Crussard
- Headquarters: Issy-les-Moulineaux FranceFrance
- Key people: Patrick Blethon (Chairman & CEO)
- Services: Water treatment, waste management, leisure management
- Revenue: €2 317 million (2024)
- Number of employees: 12 000 (2025)
- Subsidiaries: Natural System Utilities, Stereau, Cise TP, Imageau, Nijhuis Saur Industries, Saur Services, Odalie Coldep, Aquachem
- Website: https://www.saur.com

Saur (acronym for Société d’aménagement urbain et rural — Urban and Rural Planning Company) is a French company specialized in water management services. Its core business is organized around delegated service management for local authorities and the provision of water treatment solutions for industrial clients. The group is also active in the engineering and construction of water treatment facilities. Its activities cover the full water cycle, including operation, investment, engineering, and the development of treatment technologies.

In France, Saur is the third-largest water management operator. Internationally, the group has established significant operations in Southern Europe—particularly in the Iberian Peninsula—as well as in the Middle East, alongside activities in North America, Asia, and South America.

As of 2025, Saur employs approximately 12,000 people worldwide and reported revenues of €2.3 billion in 2024.

== History ==
Saur was created in 1933 by Pierre Crussard as a water resource management company. Initially the company was exclusively a water facilities construction company, but beginning in 1934, it started water exploitation and distribution.

In 1984, the Bouygues Group became the majority shareholder. In 1997, the Saur Group merged with Cise, Saint-Gobain's environment subsidiary.

On April 5, 2017, the Saur Group refocused on its core business, water, and announced the official sale of its waste management subsidiary (Coved) to Paprec for an estimated amount of approximately €250 million.

In June 2019, Saur made its first acquisition in South America by acquiring the Colombian company Naunet, which manages drinking water distribution and sanitation services. At the end of November 2019, the Saur Group decided to invest in technology by acquiring a 51% stake in the British company Riventa Ltd, a startup specializing in water management innovation.

In June 2020, Saur acquired Nijhuis Industries, a Dutch company specializing in industrial wastewater treatment.

In January 2021, Saur acquired Aquapor, a major player and leader in the Portuguese water sector. Subsequently, the group acquired several other industrial water treatment companies across Europe—including Gestagua in Spain—and in the United States, with the acquisition of Aqua-Chem in 2022.

In 2023, Saur acquired Natural Systems Utilities, a company specializing in water reutilisation and announced its intention to buy Suez Industrial Water and Veolia Mobile Water Services.

In October 2024, the company announced the issuance of €500 million in "blue bonds," an investment dedicated to projects related to the protection of water resources. Also in 2024, Saur launched its joint venture with Inovaya, named Odalie a company specializing in the real estate sector that offers Aquapod, a solution designed for greywater recycling.

In November 2025, the group’s Dutch subsidiary acquired a majority stake in Coldep, a water treatment specialist. Also in November 2025, at the Sérignac-sur-Garonne site, Saur implemented its Carbo Plus technology for the first time. This system uses activated carbon to treat pesticides, micropollutants, and pharmaceutical residues.

== Operations ==
=== Overview ===
In 2022, Saur served 20 million consumers across 9,500 local authorities and industrial clients worldwide. The company operates in more than 25 countries.

Saur’s international operations are structured around several key regions. In Southern Europe, particularly in Portugal and Spain, the group operates municipal water and wastewater services through established local operators. In the Middle East, Saur is involved in water and wastewater management contracts, notably through long-term operating agreements and public-private partnership frameworks (Qatar, Saudi Arabia, UAE).

The group also maintains operations in North America (United States), Asia, with a strong focus on industrial water treatment and reuse solutions.

In 2025, Saur employs 12,000 people.

Saur serves 6,700 municipalities in France, providing water and sanitation services to seven million consumers. The Saur Group is involved in developing treatment processes, particularly for the removal of micropollutants.

=== Subsidiaries ===
==== Nijhuis Saur Industries (NSI) ====
With the acquisition of the Dutch company Nijhuis Industries, the group has structured a division dedicated to industrial clients, named Nijhuis Saur Industries (NSI). This division designs and operates process water and effluent treatment facilities for sectors such as food and beverage, chemicals, pharmaceuticals, and heavy industry in general. It also includes mobile water services (mobile treatment units for temporary or emergency needs), as well as energy recovery (converting sewage sludge and industrial effluents into biogas or biomethane).

==== Natural Systems Utilities ====
Acquired in 2023, Natural Systems Utilities (NSU) is one of the leading providers of turnkey solutions for wastewater treatment and treated wastewater reuse in the United States, with more than 270 systems currently in operation.

==== Aqua-Chem ====
The acquisition of Aqua-Chem strengthens the Saur Group's position in the North American water treatment market. Based in Knoxville, Tennessee, the firm operates in 40 countries and specializes in water purification.

==== Stereau ====
Stereau is the engineering subsidiary of the Saur Group. Stereau handles the 'design, construction, and operational assistance' of wastewater treatment plants and drinking water production facilities. The company also specializes in the construction of process water treatment plants and equipment for odor control, grease removal, and sludge volume reduction.

==== ImaGeau ====
ImaGeau, a Saur Group subsidiary, specializes in digital water technologies. Established in 2009, the company operates a hydrogeology consulting office alongside proprietary business software dedicated to the water sector. Notably, ImaGeau processes vast amounts of data concerning water resources.

==== Cise TP ====
Cise TP designs, installs, and rehabilitates water distribution networks, ranging from wastewater collection to stormwater management.

==== Coldep ====
Coldep is an entity featuring patented vacuum pressure separation technology (Vacuum Air Lift), which enables the separation of contaminants from water, like PFAS.

== Governance ==
- Patrick Blethon (Executive Chairman of the Saur Group);
- Luis de Lope (President of Saur International);
- Estelle Grelier (President of Saur France);

== Ownership ==
The main shareholder of Saur is EQT Partners, along with DIF Capital Partners and the PGGM Infrastructure Fund.
