= Sophie Vaginay-Ricourt =

French politician (born 1969)

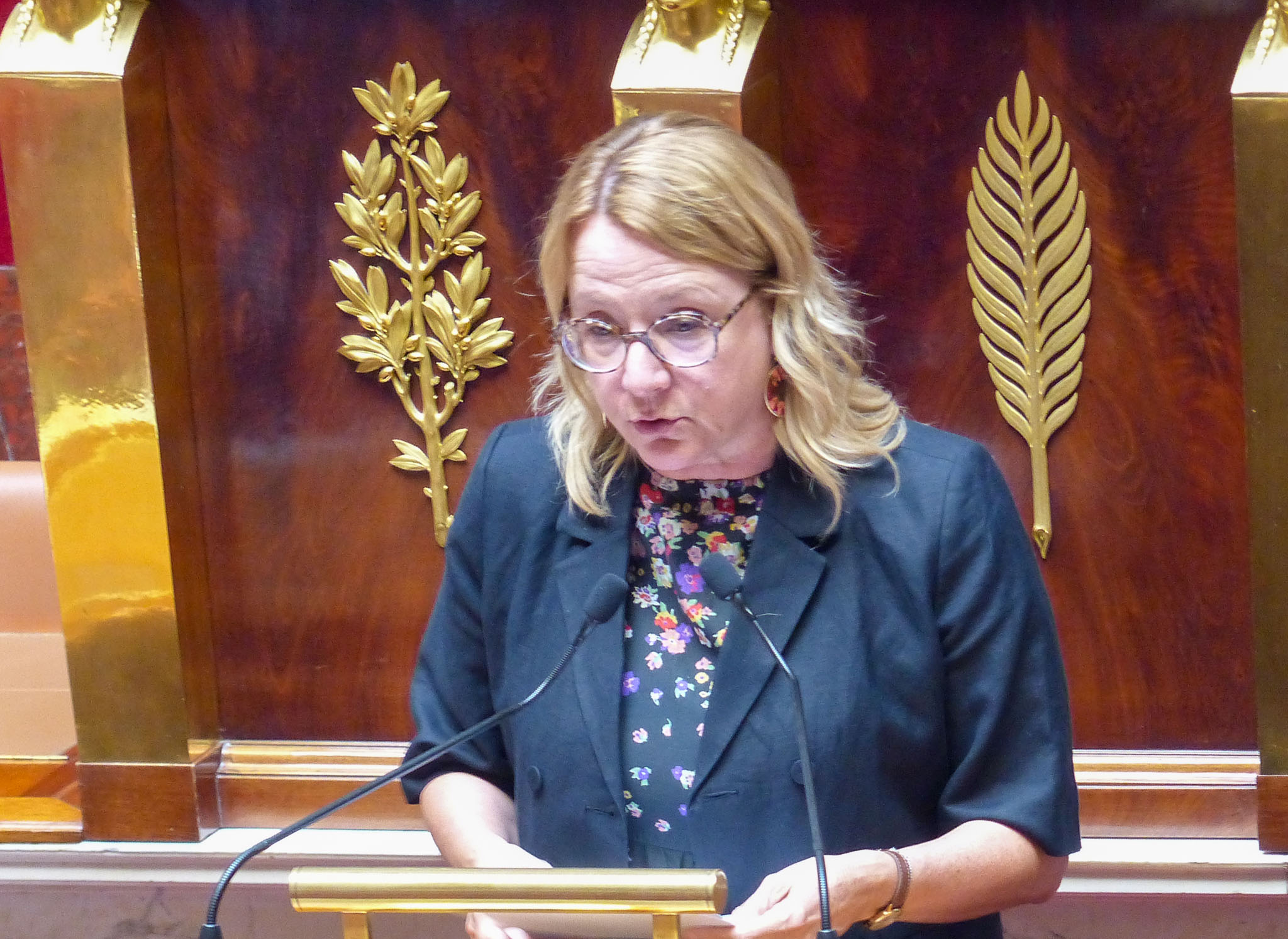

Member of the French National Assembly for Alpes-de-Haute-Provence's 2nd constituency
- Incumbent
- Assumed office 18 July 2024
- Preceded by: Léo Walter

Personal details
- Born: 18 December 1969 (age 56)
- Party: Union of the Right for the Republic (2024–present)
- Other political affiliations: Rally for the Republic (until 2002); Union for a Popular Movement (2002–2015); The Republicans (2015–2024)

Sophie Vaginay-Ricourt (born 18 December 1969) is a French politician of the Union of the Right for the Republic (UDR). She was elected member of the National Assembly for Alpes-de-Haute-Provence's 2nd constituency in 2024.
