= Jacqueline de Guillenchmidt =

French magistrate

Member the Constitutional Council
- In office 10 March 2004 – 3 March 2013
- Appointed by: Christian Poncelet
- President: Pierre Mazeaud; Jean-Louis Debré
- Preceded by: Yves Guéna
- Succeeded by: Nicole Belloubet

Personal details
- Born: 25 September 1943 (age 83) Beijing, China
- Education: Sciences Po

Jacqueline de Guillenchmidt (born Jacqueline Barbara de Labelotterie de Boisséson on 25 September 1943 in Beijing, China) was a member of the Constitutional Council of France from 2004 to 2013.

Previously she was a member of Conseil supérieur de l'audiovisuel (CSA).
