= Dordogne's 1st constituency =

Constituency of the National Assembly of France

- Constituency for the National Assembly
- Boundary of Dordogne's 1st constituency in Dordogne

- Location of Dordogne within France
- Department: Dordogne
- Region: Nouvelle-Aquitaine
- Population: 105,553 (2013)
- Electorate: 78,107 (2024)

Current constituency
- Deputy: Nadine Lechon
- Political party: RN

Dordogne's 1st constituency is one of four French legislative constituencies in the department of Dordogne. It is currently represented by Pascale Martin of La France Insoumise (LFI).

== Historic representation ==
Legislature	Start of mandate	End of mandate	Deputy	Party
1st	9 December 1958	9 October 1962	Raoul Rousseau	UNR
2nd	6 December 1962	2 April 1967	Yves Guéna	UNR
3rd	3 April 1967	7 May 1968	Yves Guéna	UD-V^{e}
3rd	8 May 1968	30 May 1968	Claude Guichard	UD-V^{e}
4th	11 July 1968	12 August 1968	Yves Guéna	RI
4th	13 August 1968	1 April 1973	Claude Guichard	RI
5th	2 April 1973	6 May 1973	Yves Guéna	UDR
5th	7 May 1973	12 July 1974	Jean Lovato	UDR
5th	13 July 1974	5 October 1974	Vacant	
5th	6 October 1974	2 April 1978	Yves Guéna	UDR
6th	3 April 1978	22 May 1981	Yves Guéna	RPR
7th	2 July 1981	18 January 1984	Roland Dumas	PS
7th	19 January 1984	1 April 1986	Christian Défarge	PS
8th	2 April 1986	14 May 1988	Proportional representation	
9th	23 June 1988	1 April 1993	Bernard Bioulac	PS
10th	2 April 1993	21 April 1997	François Roussel	RPR
11th	12 June 1997	18 June 2002	Michel Dasseux	PS
12th	19 June 2002	19 June 2007	Michel Dasseux	PS
13th	20 June 2007	19 June 2012	Pascal Deguilhem	PS
14th	20 June 2012	20 June 2017	Pascal Deguilhem	PS
15th	21 June 2017	21 June 2022	Philippe Chassaing	LREM
16th	22 June 2022	9 June 2024	Pascale Martin	LFI
17th	7 July 2024	ongoing	Nadine Lechon	RN

== Elections ==
=== 2024 ===
Candidate	Party	Alliance	First round			Second round		
Candidate	Party	Alliance	Votes	%	+/–	Votes	%	+/–
Nadine Lechon	RN		20,199	38.24	+17.95	24,180	50.09	new
Pascale Martin	LFI	NFP	15,540	29.42	+5.09	24,089	49.91	-1.94
Clément Tonon	HOR	ENS	12,835	24.30	+2.82	WITHDREW		
Bérenger Desport Namur	LR		2,789	5.28	-6.87			
Jonathan Almosnino	LO		751	1.42	+0.60			
Antoine Coutou	REC		572	1.08	-2.81			
Stéphane Lambert	DIV		129	0.24	new			
Votes			52,815	100.00		48,269	100.00	
Valid votes			52,815	96.06	-1.07	48,269	88.27	-0.39
Blank votes			1,245	2.26	+0.57	4,310	7.88	+1.19
Null votes			922	1.68	+0.50	2,103	3.85	-0.80
Turnout			54,982	70.39	+16.89	54,682	70.01	+18.68
Abstentions			23,125	29.61	-16.89	23,425	29.99	-18.68
Registered voters			78,107			78,107		
Result		RN GAIN FROM LFI						

=== 2022 ===
Legislative Election 2022: Dordogne's 1st constituency
Party	Candidate	Votes	%	±%
LFI (NUPÉS)	Pascale Martin	9,845	24.33	-11.21
LREM (Ensemble)	Philippe Chassaing	8,692	21.48	-13.11
RN	Williams Ambroise	8,209	20.29	+6.51
LR (UDC)	Elisabeth Marty	4,915	12.15	−1.52
PS	Floran Vadillo*	4,360	10.78	N/A
REC	Pascale Leger	1,572	3.89	N/A
Others	N/A	2,867	7.09	
Turnout		40,460	53.50	−0.72
2nd round result
LFI (NUPÉS)	Pascale Martin	18,366	51.85	+4.38
LREM (Ensemble)	Philippe Chassaing	17,053	48.15	−4.38
Turnout		35,419	51.33	+2.72
LFI gain from LREM				

* PS dissident

=== 2017 ===
Candidate	Label	First round		Second round	
Candidate	Label	Votes	%	Votes	%
Philippe Chassaing	REM	13,785	34.59	17,298	52.53
Hélène Reys	FI	7,129	17.89	15,633	47.47
Marie-Catherine Halliday	FN	5,491	13.78		
Laurent Mossion	LR	5,448	13.67		
Michel Moyrand	PS	4,295	10.78		
Vianney Le Vacon	PCF	1,673	4.20		
Yann Lavalou	ECO	1,065	2.67		
Corinne Roethlisberger	EXG	370	0.93		
Gallo Thiam	DVD	328	0.82		
Daniel Santalo	DIV	273	0.68		
Votes		39,857	100.00	32,931	100.00
Valid votes		39,857	96.70	32,931	89.12
Blank votes		899	2.18	2,456	6.65
Null votes		462	1.12	1,566	4.24
Turnout		41,218	54.22	36,953	48.61
Abstentions		34,808	45.78	39,060	51.39
Registered voters		76,026		76,013	
Source: Ministry of the Interior

=== 2012 ===
2012 legislative election in Dordogne's 1st constituency
Candidate	Party	First round		Second round	
Candidate	Party	Votes	%	Votes	%
Pascal Deguilhem	PS	22,906	49.27%	29,347	65.99%
Philippe Cornet	UMP	11,436	24.60%	15,124	34.01%
Alexandre Bodecot	FN	4,883	10.50%		
Violette Folgado	FG	4,208	9.05%		
Francis Cortez	EELV	1,015	2.18%		
Marie-José Abenoza	DLR	497	1.07%		
Monique Escolier	??	311	0.67%		
Fatahi Kuye	NC	303	0.65%		
Florence Valdes	AEI	294	0.63%		
Lionel Agullo	MEI	219	0.47%		
André Rosevegue	NPA	217	0.47%		
Josefa Torres	LO	206	0.44%		
Valid votes		46,495	97.98%	44,471	96.11%
Spoilt and null votes		958	2.02%	1,803	3.90%
Votes cast / turnout		47,453	63.22%	46,273	61.64%
Abstentions		27,612	36.78%	28,797	38.36%
Registered voters		75,065	100.00%	75,070	100.00%
