= Attal government =

Government of France in 2024

- 44th Government of French Fifth Republic
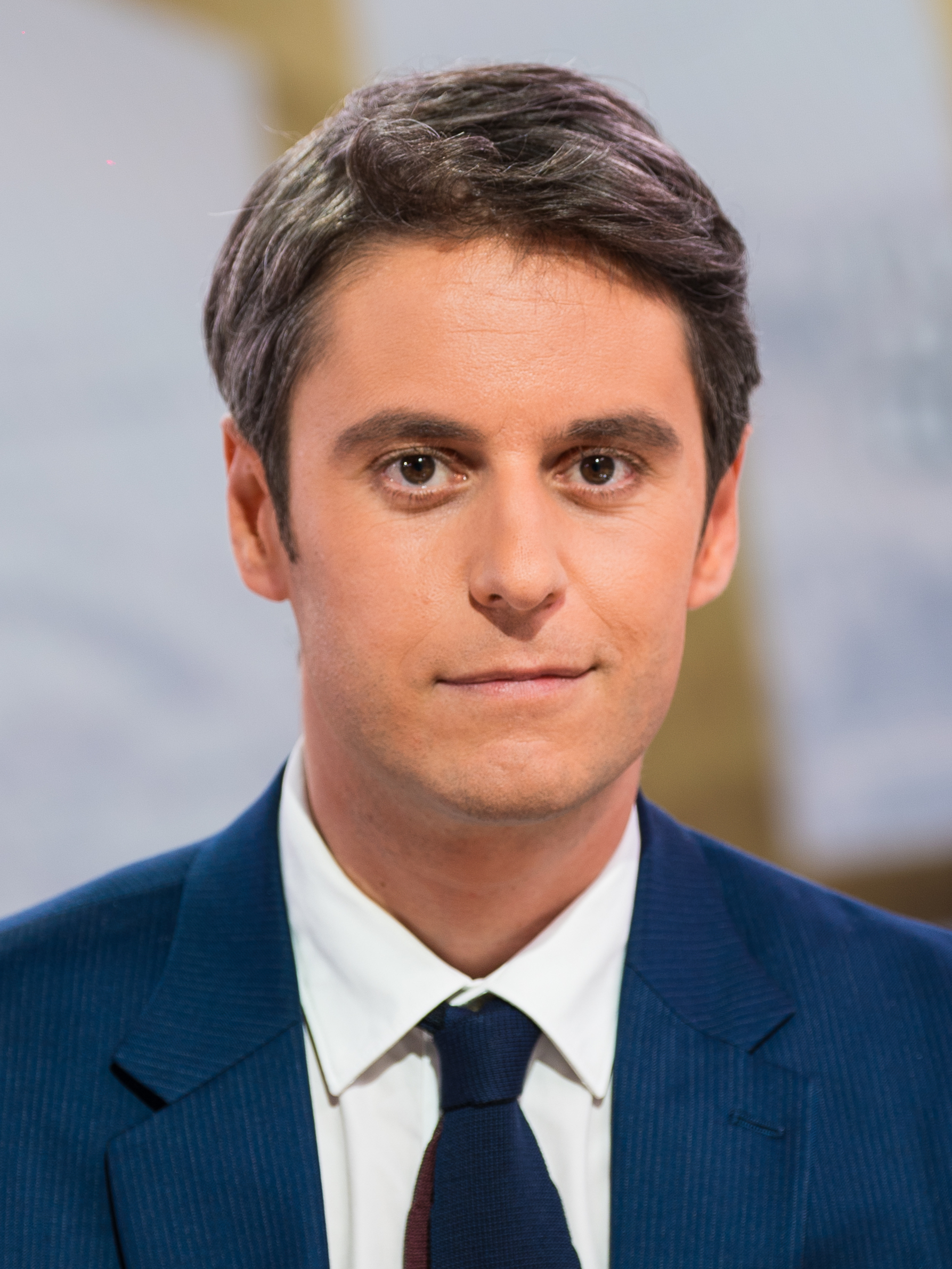
- Attal in 2025
- Date formed: 9 January 2024
- Date dissolved: 5 September 2024

People and organisations
- President of the Republic: Emmanuel Macron
- Prime Minister: Gabriel Attal
- No. of ministers: 34 (Note: Does not include the Prime Minister.)
- Member parties: RE; MoDem; HOR
- Status in legislature: Minority (January – July 2024); Caretaker (July – September 2024)
- Opposition parties: RN; LFI; LR; PS; EELV; PCF

History
- Election: 2022 French legislative election
- Legislature term: 2022–2024
- Predecessor: Borne government
- Successor: Barnier government

The Attal government (French: gouvernement Attal) was the forty-fourth government of the French Fifth Republic, formed on 9 January 2024 and headed by Gabriel Attal as Prime Minister under the presidency of Emmanuel Macron. It served as a caretaker government from July to September 2024, before Michel Barnier was appointed prime minister.

The Attal cabinet was a three-party minority government as a result of the 2022 legislative election that left the governing coalition short of an absolute majority in Parliament. His government managed to survive votes of no confidence thanks to the repeated abstentions of MPs from The Republicans. Following the second round of the 2024 legislative election, Attal remained Prime minister until the appointment of Michel Barnier on 5 September.

== History ==
=== Formation ===
==== Context ====
In late December 2023, the passage of an immigration and asylum bill originating from a deal struck between Borne's minority government and the conservative LR party left Macron's governing coalition in political crisis, especially after some left-leaning ministers threatened to resign if the bill was passed, something which was seen as a major breach of collective responsibility, while scores of Macronist deputies defied the government by either abstaining or voting against the legislation. Hours after the bill was passed, Health Minister Aurélien Rousseau resigned in protest; Higher Education Minister Sylvie Retailleau offered her resignation as well although President Macron refused it. Others, such as Transport Minister Clément Beaune, voiced their opposition to the bill but did not quit.

As 2024 approached, news media began to speculate about a potential change of prime minister in a last-ditch effort by Macron both to revive his second presidential term and reassert his diminished political authority.

==== Élisabeth Borne's resignation ====
When Élisabeth Borne resigned as prime minister on 8 January 2024, she made clear in her resignation letter that she was not doing so of her own initiative but rather to comply with Macron's will to replace her with a new officeholder. In her letter, she also quoted a line from her distant predecessor Michel Rocard's own resignation letter, a reference to the fact that, like him, she was compelled to resign by the President while she would have wanted to carry on as head of government.

Legal scholar Ariane Vidal-Naquet, in an op-ed in Le Monde, said that Borne's "forced resignation" was "not consistent with the Constitution" even though it is widely accepted under a presidential interpretation of the Constitution.

After Borne resigned on 8 January, she remained prime minister in a caretaking capacity until handing over to Attal a day later.

==== Attal's appointment as Prime Minister ====
In the run-up to Gabriel Attal's appointment as prime minister, news media cited several politicians as main contenders for the premiership: Defence Minister Sébastien Lecornu, former National Assembly President Richard Ferrand, former Agriculture Minister Julien Denormandie and Environment Minister Christophe Béchu were among the names cited for Macron's pick.

Hours before the appointment, when Attal emerged as the most likely pick for the premiership, several prominent figures inside Macron's camp, such as junior coalition partners François Bayrou (MoDem party leader) and Édouard Philippe (Horizons party leader and Macron's prime minister from 2017 to 2020) or incumbent government ministers such as Interior Minister Gérald Darmanin and Finance Minister Bruno Le Maire, reportedly opposed the pick and tried to weigh in on the presidential decision.

Prior to being appointed as prime minister, Attal was the most popular minister in Macron's cabinet according to polling data. Upon taking office, Attal became both the youngest head of government in French modern history and youngest state leader in the world. He is also the first openly LGBT person to lead a French government.

==== Choice for cabinet posts ====
The new Attal cabinet was widely described as the most right-leaning government since the start of the Macron presidency: out of the 14 cabinet ministers appointed on 11 January 2024 by Macron, 57% are former members of the conservative UMP/LR party. Furthermore, right-leaning politicians are left holding the largest government portfolios, such as the Interior, Finance, Defence, Labour, Health, Culture and Environment, a political configuration seen as indicating a tilt to the right.

Additionally, longtime Macron allies and prominent left-leaning ministers of the outgoing Borne government, such as Rima Abdul-Malak (Culture), Clément Beaune (Transport) and Olivier Véran (Spokesperson), were sacked as part of the reshuffle.

=== Parliamentary history ===
==== Vote of confidence ====
On 16 January 2024, Attal announced that, like Élisabeth Borne before him, he would not be seeking a vote of confidence in the National Assembly as it is implicitly allowed in the French Constitution. If a confidence vote had taken place, Attal's government would have likely fallen as it was 39 seats short of an overall majority in the lower house.

As it was widely expected, left-wing LFI leader Manuel Bompard announced that his parliamentary group would table a motion of no confidence in response to Attal's decision. The no-confidence motion substantially failed to receive enough votes to topple the cabinet since right-wing parties refused to support the attempt at this early stage in the government's tenure.

=== End ===
On 9 June, Macron dissolved the National Assembly and called for a snap election. Following the second round of the election on 7 July, which resulted in a hung parliament, Attal announced his intent to submit his resignation to Macron the next day. However, the resignation was refused by Macron, who asked Attal to remain at least temporarily prime minister in order to help preserve stability. Attal's resignation was accepted on 16 July 2024. Despite this, Attal would stay on as head of a caretaker government,

The left-wing alliance New Popular Front proposed Lucie Castets as Prime Minister but Macron refused to appoint her, arguing that no party had won a majority. Attal remained in place as the head of a caretaker government, until Michel Barnier was appointed as Prime minister on 5 September. Attal's ministers remained as caretakers until the Barnier government was fully formed on 21 September.

== Composition ==
As it is customary, Secretary General of the Presidency Alexis Kohler announced the new government's composition on 11 January 2024 from the Élysée Palace. Members of the previous government remained in office under a caretaking capacity until the appointment of the new government, as provided for in the French Constitution.

In February 2024, a second raft of government appointments took place: the total number of government ministers went up from 14 to 34. Apart from the numerous junior ministerial appointments, notably, the ministries of National Education and Sports, which had been merged in January through Amélie Oudéa-Castéra's appointment as Education and Sports minister, were once again de-merged. Oudéa-Castéra was demoted, returning as Sports minister, and former Justice minister Nicole Belloubet replaced her as Education minister. Additionally, Stanislas Guerini was re-appointed as Civil Service minister.

=== Ministers ===
Portfolio	Name	Party
Prime Minister	Gabriel Attal	RE
Minister of Economy, Finances and Industrial & Digital Sovereignty	Bruno Le Maire	RE
Minister of the Interior and Overseas	Gérald Darmanin	RE
Minister of Labour, Health and Solidarity	Catherine Vautrin	SE
Minister of National Education and Youth	Nicole Belloubet	SE
Minister of Sports and the Olympic & Paralympic Games	Amélie Oudéa-Castéra	RE
Minister for Agriculture and Food Sovereignty	Marc Fesneau	MoDem
Minister for Culture	Rachida Dati	SE
Minister of the Armed Forces	Sébastien Lecornu	RE
Minister of Justice / Keeper of the Seals	Éric Dupond-Moretti	SE
Minister for Europe and Foreign Affairs	Stéphane Séjourné	RE
Minister for Ecological Transition and Territorial Cohesion	Christophe Béchu	HOR
Minister for Transformation and Civil Service	Stanislas Guerini	RE
Minister of Higher Education and Research	Sylvie Retailleau	SE

==== Deputy Ministers ====
Portfolio	Attached minister	Name	Party
Minister for Democratic Renewal, Government Spokesperson	Prime Minister	Prisca Thevenot	RE
Minister for Relations with Parliament	Prime Minister	Marie Lebec	RE
Minister for Gender Equality, Diversity and Equal Opportunities	Prime Minister	Aurore Bergé	RE
Minister for Industry and Energy	Minister of Economy, Finances and Industrial & Digital Sovereignty	Roland Lescure	RE
Minister for Businesses, Tourism and Consumption	Minister of Economy, Finances and Industrial & Digital Sovereignty	Olivia Grégoire	RE
Minister for Public Accounts	Minister of Economy, Finances and Industrial & Digital Sovereignty	Thomas Cazenave	RE
Minister for Territorial Collectivities and Rural Affairs	Minister of the Interior and Overseas; Minister for Ecological Transition and Territorial Cohesion	Dominique Faure	PR
Minister of Overseas	Minister of the Interior and Overseas	Marie Guévenoux	RE
Minister for Children, Youth and Family	Minister of Labour, Health and Solidarity; Minister of National Education and Youth; Minister of Justice / Keeper of the Seals	Sarah El Haïry	MoDem
Minister for the Elderly and People with Disabilities	Minister of Labour, Health and Solidarity	Fadila Khattabi	RE
Minister for Health and Prevention	Minister of Labour, Health and Solidarity	Frédéric Valletoux	HOR
Minister without portfolio	Minister for Agriculture and Food Sovereignty	Agnès Pannier-Runacher	RE
Minister for Foreign Trade, Attractiveness, Francophonie and French Nationals Abroad	Minister for Europe and Foreign Affairs	Franck Riester	RE
Minister for Europe	Minister for Europe and Foreign Affairs	Jean-Noël Barrot	MoDem
Minister of Transport	Minister for Ecological Transition and Territorial Cohesion	Patrice Vergriete	SE
Minister for Housing	Minister for Ecological Transition and Territorial Cohesion	Guillaume Kasbarian	RE

==== State Secretaries ====
Portfolio	Attached minister	Name	Party
State Secretary for Digital Affairs	Minister of Economy, Finances and Industrial & Digital Sovereignty	Marina Ferrari	MoDem
State Secretary for Cities and Citizenship	Minister of the Interior and Overseas; Minister for Ecological Transition and Territorial Cohesion	Sabrina Agresti-Roubache	RE
State Secretary for Veterans and Remembrance	Minister of the Armed Forces	Patricia Mirallès	RE
State Secretary for Development and International Partnerships	Minister for Europe and Foreign Affairs	Chrysoula Zacharopoulou	RE
State Secretary for the Sea and Biodiversity	Minister for Ecological Transition and Territorial Cohesion	Hervé Berville	RE

== Civil service ==
- Emmanuel Moulin, Chief of Staff to the Prime minister
