= Nicole Belloubet =

French jurist and politician

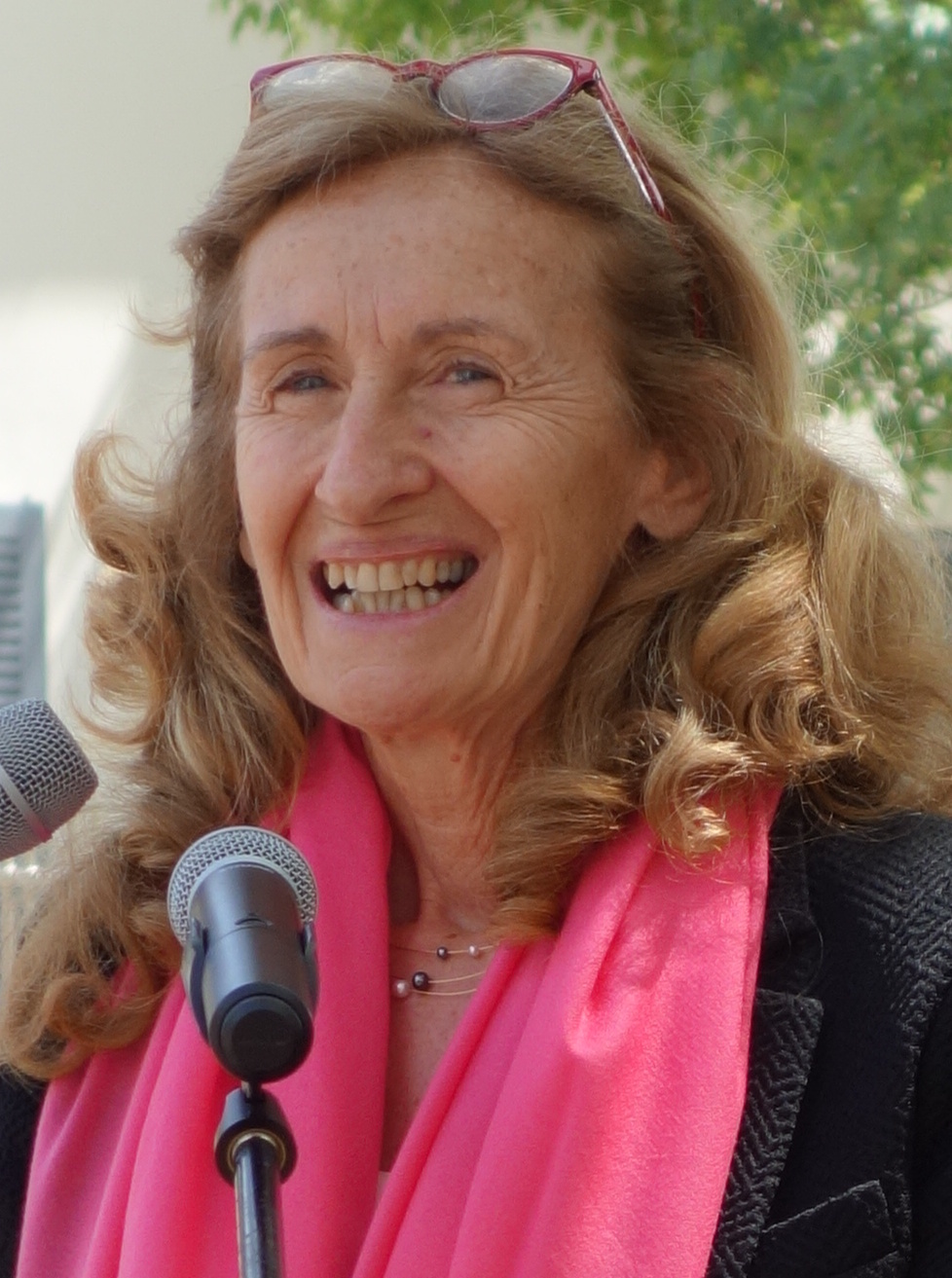
- Belloubet in 2018

Minister of National Education
- In office 8 February 2024 – 21 September 2024
- Prime Minister: Gabriel Attal
- Preceded by: Amélie Oudéa-Castéra
- Succeeded by: Anne Genetet

Keeper of the Seals, Minister of Justice
- In office 21 June 2017 – 6 July 2020
- Prime Minister: Édouard Philippe
- Preceded by: François Bayrou
- Succeeded by: Éric Dupond-Moretti

Member of the Constitutional Council
- In office 14 March 2013 – 21 June 2017
- Appointed by: Jean-Pierre Bel
- President: Jean-Louis Debré; Laurent Fabius
- Preceded by: Jacqueline de Guillenchmidt
- Succeeded by: Dominique Lottin

Member of the Midi-Pyrénées Regional Council
- In office 26 March 2010 – 13 March 2013
- President: Martin Malvy

Deputy Mayor of Toulouse
- In office 21 March 2008 – 26 March 2010
- President: Pierre Cohen

Personal details
- Born: 15 June 1955 (age 71) Paris, France
- Party: Independent (2017–present)
- Other political affiliations: Socialist Party (1983–2013)
- Spouse: Pierre-Laurent Frier (died 2005)
- Children: 3
- Education: Panthéon-Assas University; Pantheon-Sorbonne University
- Website: Council website

Nicole Belloubet (French: [nikɔl bɛlubɛ]; born 15 June 1955) is a French jurist and politician who served as Minister of National Education in the government of Prime Minister Gabriel Attal in 2024.

A former member of the Socialist Party (PS), Belloubet served as Minister of Justice in the government of Prime Minister Édouard Philippe from 21 June 2017 to 6 July 2020; she had been appointed by President Emmanuel Macron following the resignation of François Bayrou. She previously served on the Constitutional Council, to which she was appointed in 2013 by Jean-Pierre Bel, President of the Senate.

== Early life and education ==
Belloubet was born to an engineer from a modest farming family and the manager of a small Parisian hotel.

== Academic career ==
Belloubet began her career in teaching before becoming, at the age of 42, rector of the University of Limoges. She served in that office between 1997 and 2000 before becoming rector of the Academy of Toulouse until 2005. In 2005, she resigned from her post to protest against decisions made by the government of Prime Minister Jean-Pierre Raffarin which wanted to reduce the number of teachers, among other reforms.

== Political career ==
Belloubet joined the Socialist Party (PS) in 1983.

From 2000 to 2005, Belloubet chaired the French government's Inter-Ministerial Steering Committee for the Promotion of Gender Equality in the Education System. In particular, she drafted reports on "the future of the lycée" (2002) and on "combating gender-based and sexual violence in schools" (2001). She has also written on secularism and co-education in schools.

In parallel to her teaching, Belloubet later pursued a career in local politics, in particular as first deputy to the Socialist Mayor of Toulouse, Pierre Cohen, between 2008 and 2010. In 2010, she became regional councillor for Midi-Pyrénées, of which she was also first vice-president.

On 12 February 2013, Belloubet was appointed by Jean-Pierre Bel, President of the Senate, to serve on the Constitutional Council for a nine-year term, succeeding Jacqueline de Guillenchmidt. She became the first woman professor of law appointed to the Constitutional Council, and the seventh female member of the institution.

As Minister of Justice, Belloubet's first major project was to steer through the legislative process two bills on public ethics that were meant to help clean up national politics after hard-fought debates over a clause scrapping lawmakers’ constituency funds, which critics argued encourage clientelism. Internationally, she made headlines in 2019 when she publicly rejected U.S. President Donald Trump’s call for European allies to repatriate hundreds of Islamic State fighters from Syria and instead announced that France would be taking back militants on a “case-by-case” basis.

In early 2020, the Mila affair erupted over a 16-year-old girl insulting Islam on social media and then receiving violent threats. Belloubet was scrutinised for having erroneously said that insulting religion is against "freedom of conscience" in French law. She later corrected herself on the matter.

== Controversy ==
When she joined the government in June 2017, Belloubet omitted to declare part of her shares in several real estate assets, including a house in Aveyron and two apartments in Paris.

== Personal life ==
Belloubet was married to Pierre-Laurent Frier, professor of public law at the University of Paris 1 Pantheon-Sorbonne, until his death in 2005. The couple had three sons.

== Honors and awards ==
- Commander of the Order of Legion of Honour
- Knight of the Ordre National du Mérite
- Commander of the Ordre des Palmes Académiques

Legal offices
Preceded by Jacqueline de Guillenchmidt	Member of the Constitutional Council; 2013–2017	Succeeded by Dominique Lottin
Political offices
Preceded by François Bayrou	Minister of Justice; 2017–2020	Succeeded by Éric Dupond-Moretti
Preceded by Amélie Oudéa-Castéra	Minister of National Education; 2024	Succeeded by Anne Genetet
