= Philippe Chassaing =

French politician (born 1972)

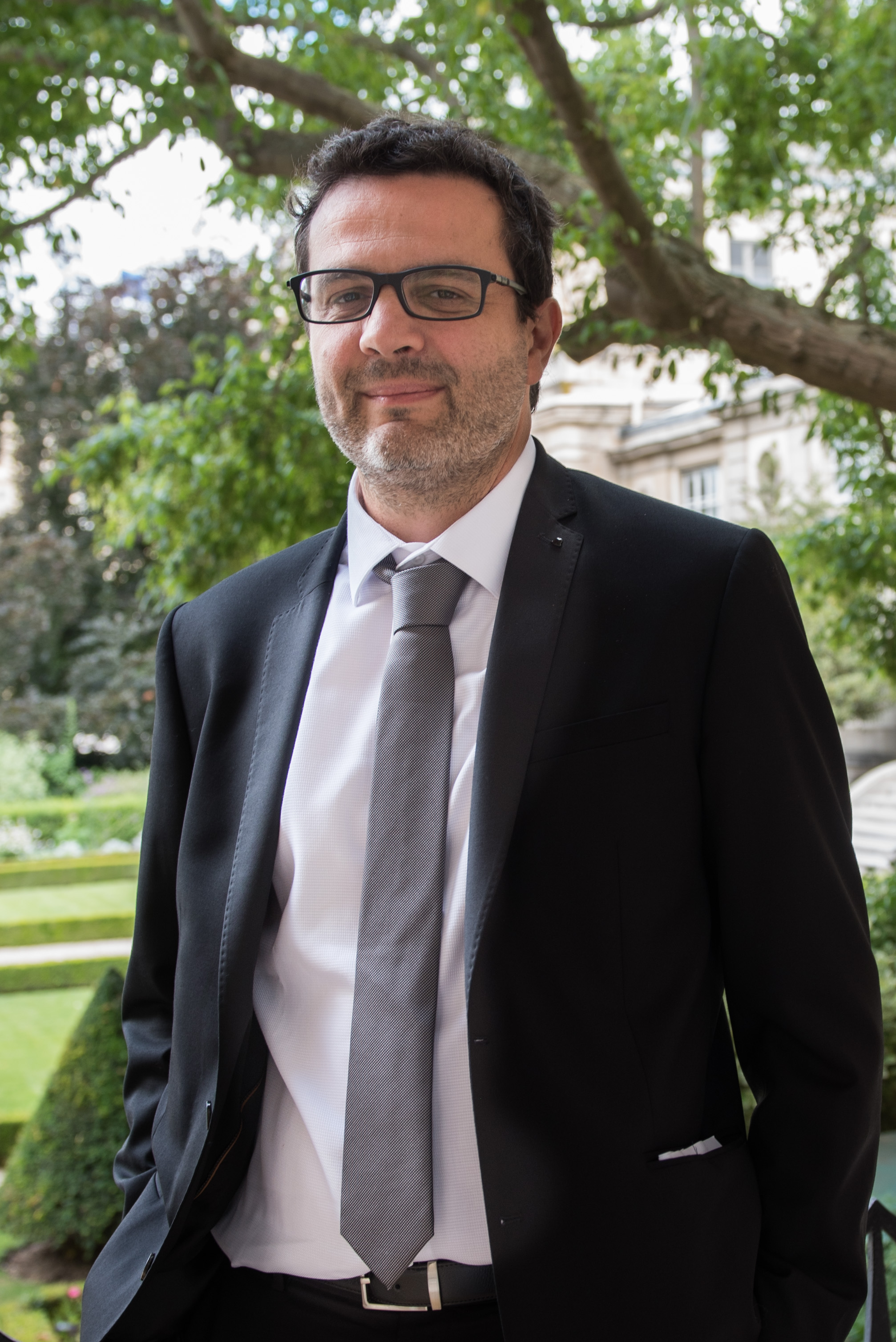
- Philippe Chassaing in June 2017

Member of the National Assembly for Dordogne's 1st constituency
- In office 21 June 2017 – 21 June 2022
- Preceded by: Pascal Deguilhem
- Succeeded by: Pascale Martin

Personal details
- Born: 18 May 1972 (age 53) Albi, France
- Party: La République En Marche! TDP

Philippe Chassaing (born 18 May 1972) is a French politician representing La République En Marche! and Territories of Progress. He was elected to the French National Assembly on 18 June 2017, representing the department of Dordogne.

== See also ==
- 2017 French legislative election
