= Claude Guichard =

French politician (1928–2021)

Member of the French National Assembly
- In office 8 May 1967 – 30 May 1968
- Preceded by: Yves Guéna
- Succeeded by: Yves Guéna
- Constituency: Dordogne's 1st constituency
- In office 13 August 1968 – 1 April 1973
- Preceded by: Yves Guéna
- Succeeded by: Yves Guéna
- Constituency: Dordogne's 1st constituency

Personal details
- Born: 11 November 1928 Sainte-Foy-la-Grande, France
- Died: 30 August 2021 (aged 92)
- Party: RI

Claude Guichard (11 November 1928 – 30 August 2021) was a French politician and academic.

== Biography ==
Guichard was born in Sainte-Foy-la-Grande on 11 November 1928. He was a substitute for Yves Guéna for the Independent Republicans in the National Assembly for Dordogne's 1st constituency, as Guéna was twice named Minister of Information. He served from 8 May 1967 to 30 May 1968 and again from 13 August 1968 to 1 April 1973.

Claude Guichard died on 30 August 2021 at the age of 92.
