= Michel Lambin =

French serial killer (born 1950)

- Born: 17 April 1950 (age 76); Paris, France
- Other names: "The Shepherd of Caussols" "The Pugilist" "Bambino" "The Shepherd of the Middle"
- Conviction: Murder
- Penalty: Life imprisonment with 22 years preventative detention

Details
- Victims: 2–10+
- Span of crimes: 21 January 1983 – 1 July 2004
- Country: France
- States: Île-de-France, Provence-Alpes-Côte-d'Azur
- Date apprehended: 27 September 2005

Michel Lambin (born 17 April 1950) is a French serial killer nicknamed the ‘Shepherd of Caussols’, the “Pugilist” or the ‘Shepherd of the Middle’. He is believed to have killed ten people between 1983 and 2004.

== Biography ==
=== Youth ===
Michel Lambin was born on 17 April 1950 in the northern suburbs of Paris. Lambin dropped out of school in 1964, at the age of 14.

In 1967, he served his first prison sentence at Fresnes Prison. Passionate about firearms and rebellious in nature, he served numerous prison terms for car theft, carrying prohibited weapons, and assault. In 1968, Lambin married at the age of 18. He later became the father of three daughters, born to his wife.

In the 1970s, Lambin tried to find stable employment but was unsuccessful. He worked as a butcher and an electrician, but was quickly dismissed for violence against a colleague and for theft from the company where he worked.

The nickname "The Pugilist" comes from his tendency to be violent and aggressive.

=== Robbery case ===
On 3 March 1977, Lambin committed a robbery at his former workplace, located in the 18th arrondissement of Paris. The attack netted him 250,000 FRF in loot. Several witnesses provided descriptions of the perpetrator. The car parked during the robbery was recognised as belonging to Lambin, who had previously worked at the company that was robbed. Taken into custody, Lambin denied being responsible for the robbery. He was imprisoned at Fresnes Prison for armed robbery and theft. He gradually became paranoid and claimed to be convinced that he had been denounced by his brother-in-law, Kamel Guendouz, nicknamed Marcel.

In 1979, Michel Lambin's trial began before the Paris Assize Court. He was sentenced to seven years' imprisonment for the robbery of his former company. His wife obtained a divorce and custody of their three daughters. During his incarceration, Lambin met several criminals with whom he played poker. He quickly found himself in debt and began owing money to two of his fellow inmates: Christian Lepage and Jean-Jacques Villey.

=== Release and meeting his partner ===
Lambin was released in 1981 after serving four years of his sentence. In 1982, Lambin met Nicole Rossi. The two began a relationship and moved into Nicole's apartment in Cannes. When their relationship began, Nicole was 27 years old and Lambin was 32. Nicole was fully aware of Lambin's criminal past and accepted him as he was, convinced that he would not reoffend if he was ‘in good company’.

In January 1983, while Lambin was spending the evening at Nicole's house, he met Michel Tasselli, a Cannes gangster and friend of his partner. The meeting between Tasselli and Lambin quickly becomes complicated when Tasselli tells Nicole that she should not be in a relationship with Lambin, whom he describes as a ‘thug’. After Tasselli leaves, Lambin vows to kill him because he cannot accept being belittled.

=== First series of murders ===
On the night of 20 to 21 January 1983, around midnight, Lambin went to Cannes, to the car park at the foot of Nicole Rossi's building. There he found Michel Tasselli, who was sitting in his car after celebrating his 33rd birthday at Nicole's place. Armed with a pistol, Lambin approached Tasselli's car, where he was still sitting at that moment, and shot him twice in the body. The body was later found by a passer-by. Following his crime, Lambin began drinking and, an hour later, went to Nicole's house and told her that he had killed Tasselli. However, Nicole Rossi did not take Lambin's statements seriously because he was drunk and because he had plans for her as a couple. The murder of Michel Tasselli therefore remains unsolved.

On 17 July, Lambin and Kamel Guendouz, his 42-year-old ex-brother-in-law, nicknamed ‘Marcel’, had lunch in Bobigny with Marcel's daughters and Nicole Rossi. At the end of the meal, Lambin, Marcel and Nicole Rossi left in Lambin's car. On the way, Lambin took Marcel to an abandoned building between Paris and Meaux, where he claimed to have hidden a weapon to be used in an upcoming robbery. At Lambin's request, Marcel got out of the car first. Lambin ordered Nicole to wait there before getting out of the car himself. The two men went inside the building. Marcel entered first and Lambin followed him, gun in hand. Lambin fired two shots and Marcel died almost instantly. Lambin then returned to the car, where Nicole was still waiting for him. He told her that he has ‘killed him’. He later claimed to have dropped Marcel off, at his request, in a nearby street where he had met one of his friends. Later, Lambin returned to retrieve Marcel's body, which he cut up before putting it in a bag. He decided to cook it at a friend's house in the 15th arrondissement of Paris, using a pressure cooker, and to eat it with garlic and parsley. The friend who lent Lambin a pressure cooker later recalled a foul smell.

On 18 October, Lambin, accompanied by an accomplice, travelled by moped to Champigny-sur-Marne, to the home of Christian Lepage, one of his former fellow prisoners, aged 35, nicknamed ‘the mechanic’. Having travelled as a passenger on the moped, Lambin asked his accomplice to stop so that he could ‘run a couple of errands.’ Lambin killed Lepage with several gunshots. The dispute was over 100,000 francs lost in a poker game. Lambin then rejoined his accomplice and the two fled the scene.

Eleven days later, on 29 October, Jean-Jacques Villey, a 40-year-old friend of the ‘garage mechanic’, was changing a wheel on his vehicle in Crosne (Essonne) when Lambin and his accomplice appeared behind him. Villey was also shot several times with a pistol. Once again, the two accomplices fled and abandoned their moped. Inspector Gérard Merville, who was in charge of the homicide case, managed to find the killers' moped but, with no other evidence to go on, eventually closed the case.

A few weeks later, on 23 December, Walter Barbay, a resident of Antibes, was also murdered in Cagnes-sur-Mer (Alpes-Maritimes) by Lambin. A new investigation was launched to find the killer of this 29-year-old former delinquent, but no evidence was found to identify any suspect in the case. On 6 January 1984 in Villiers-sur-Marne, Christian Salmon, a sales representative and the new partner of one of Lambin's former mistresses, was shot dead. Salmon died a few minutes later, but before succumbing, the victim managed to say a few words in the ambulance and identified Michel Lambin as his attacker. It was in this context that Michel Lambin's name was mentioned for the first time in this case.

=== Prosecution for murder and acquittal ===
Lambin was arrested on 9 January 1984 and taken into custody. When questioned, Lambin denied the murder charges against him. Although he denied killing him, Lambin was charged with the murder of Christian Salmon and placed in pre-trial detention. While he was in prison, accused of murdering his rival, his daughters, convinced that he was responsible for Salmon's murder, ended their relationship with him. They would not see him again for several years. It was also during this period that Lambin met the robber Émile Fornasari, with whom he became friends.

Michel Lambin appeared before the Paris Assize Court on 23 June 1986. During the three days of the trial, all the witnesses identified Lambin as the perpetrator of Christian Salmon's murder. Lambin presented a receipt, dated at the time of the crime, in an attempt to exonerate himself. Defended by Jacques Vergès, Lambin was finally acquitted on 25 June and released.

=== Period without homicides ===
Between 1986 and 1991, Lambin and Nicole worked in a retirement home in Mougins. In his job, Lambin helped with cleaning and brought food and drink to the elderly patients in the establishment. Lambin was liked by everyone and, for the first time in his life, was described as an exemplary employee.

From 1991 to 1993, Lambin and Nicole moved to Plan-les-Ouates, in the canton of Geneva in Switzerland. However, the couple did not stay there for what appear to be financial reasons. In 1993, Lambin settled as a shepherd in Caussols, from where the nickname comes from ("Shepherd of Caussols"), in the hinterland of Grasse, where he began to make a living from raising his animals and selling his farm products. It was through his new profession that Lambin managed to reconnect with his three daughters. He later became a grandfather and gave up all criminal activity for several years. However, Lambin did not abandon his history as a robber. He even planned the escape of several former fellow prisoners with whom he had shared a cell some fifteen years earlier. Lambin also met Farid Errachdi, a young delinquent looking to launder money, and decided to take him in at his sheepfold.

On 24 March 2001, 39-year-old robber Émile Fornasari escaped from a prison in Draguignan by helicopter with two other inmates, Jean-Félix Leca, known as ‘the Corsican’, and Abdelhamid Karmous. The three escapees were friends of Michel Lambin, who had planned the escape. Fornasari, Léca, and Karmous then moved into Lambin's caravans, who covered for them while they were on the run. To avoid arousing suspicion, Lambin told Nicole Rossi that Fornasari, Léca and Karmous had been released from prison and that he had decided to take them in so that they could find jobs.

=== Second series of murders ===
On the night of 16 April 2001, Lambin hung Farid Errachdi with a meat hook in front of his front door, in his sheepfold in Caussols. Lambin dismembered Errachdi while he was still alive, causing him to die in excruciating pain. The remains of his body and clothes were thrown into two large buckets. When Lambin committed this new murder, Jean-Félix Leca witnessed the dismemberment of Errachdi. Lambin decided to plan another murder, fearing reprisals from Léca. A few days later, Lambin enters his caravan and fires several shots at Léca, 38, with his pistol while he is sleeping. Lambin then dismembered Léca's body. Lambin cut down several trees on his farm to make a fire, then burned the remains of Léca's dismembered body. Having awakened Nicole Rossi with his gunshots, Lambin told her that he was ‘purifying him, as the Hindus do’.

On 5 December 2002, Émile Fornasari hired Lambin to murder Robert Ludi, a 33-year-old school caretaker in Antibes, whom he accused of being a little too close to his ex-partner. Robert Ludi was shot dead at around 6.30 p.m. in his car by two 11.43 mm calibre bullets fired by Lambin. Ludi was murdered in the car park of the school where he worked as a caretaker in Antibes. The next day, the victim's sister, concerned about his absence from a lunch at their mother's house, went to his workplace. She discovered his body in the parked car. The crime seemed inexplicable to the victim's relatives, who knew of no enemies he had. Investigators attempted to find physical or genetic evidence, but no usable DNA traces were found.

Continuing his escape, Fornasari left France to take refuge in Switzerland, while Lambin continued to live in his sheepfold in Caussols. Fornasari was arrested in February 2004, after nearly three years on the run. He was charged with escape and placed in pre-trial detention at the Baumettes Prison. When Lambin learned of his accomplice's arrest, he devised a plan to break him out by helicopter with the help of Jean-Yves Guerrée, a 36-year-old man released in 2003 after serving ten years in prison, in exchange for €28,000 to be shared between them.

At around 2 a.m. on 1 July 2004, Guerrée went to Lambin's sheepfold to carry out the escape plan. During the night, Lambin refused to share the €28,000 with Guerrée and shot him several times before burying his body on his large property. Nicole, who was present, witnessed the scene and saw Guerrée being killed in front of her. During July, Nicole went to a church in Mougins to confess the ten murders and assassinations committed by Lambin. The priest of the church, surprised by the confidante's statements, persuaded her to go to the police station.

Nicole Rossi went to the police station on 17 July 2004, where she recounted the ten murders that Lambin had allegedly committed since 1983. She spoke first about the murder of her ex-partner and stated, quoting Lambin, that the murder of Jean-Yves Guerrée had been carried out ‘perhaps so that his ghost would not return’. She spoke of the disappearance of Jean-Félix Leca, ‘killed with a bullet to the back of the neck because he had witnessed the dismemberment of Farid Errachdi and was so shaken that Michel Lambin thought he would talk if he were arrested.’ Nicole Rossi also states, ‘I know it's going to sound unbelievable, but he ate pieces of his victims, with garlic and parsley, and he told me that it had nothing to do with the meat, that it was a delicacy.’

=== Arrest, imprisonment and trial of murder of Jean-Yves Guerrée ===
On 27 September 2005, Lambin's sheepfold was searched and his 14-hectare plot of land was excavated in an attempt to find the three bodies believed to be buried there. After several attempts, the body of Jean-Yves Guerrée was finally found. In an advanced state of decomposition, the body was incomplete. His feet, in particular, were missing. It was in this context that Michel Lambin, aged 55, was arrested and taken into custody in connection with Guerrée's death, but he denied knowing the man, claiming to have given up a life of crime more than twenty years earlier. At the end of his police custody, Lambin was charged with the murder of Guerrée and placed in pre-trial detention. Fornasari, the accomplice named by Nicole Rossi, who is still in custody, was charged with attempted escape, although he also denied having taken part in it. Despite their denials, Lambin and Fornasari were referred to the Alpes-Maritimes Assize Court.

On 27 May 2009, Lambin appeared in court for the murder of Jean-Yves Guerrée alongside Fornasari, who was accused of attempting to escape on the night of the crime. The trial was held before the Alpes-Maritimes Assize Court. After denying the murder of Guerrée until the first day of the trial, Lambin finally confessed to the crime on 28 May. Defended by Éric Dupond-Moretti, Lambin was sentenced on 29 May to 20 years' imprisonment. Fornasari, meanwhile, was sentenced to five years' imprisonment for his attempted escape. Only Lambin appealed his sentence. In February 2011, Lambin appeared before the Court of Appeal of Aix-en-Provence for the murder of Guerrée. Once again defended by Dupond-Moretti, Lambin had his sentence reduced to 18 years' imprisonment. He was incarcerated at the prison in Grasse following his conviction.

=== Investigation into the murders of Farid Errachdi, Jean-Felix Léca and Robert Ludi ===
In April 2011, investigators digging into Lambin's past decided to return to his farm to search for traces of Errachdi and Léca, who, according to Nicole Rossi, had been buried there. It was thanks to Nicole Rossi's confession that human remains were found. Ludi's murder was also investigated because Nicole Rossi confessed that it was the result of a romantic rivalry that Fornasari, Lambin's accomplice, could not bear. During a search of the sheepfold, a rifle was found and identified as the one that may have been used to murder Ludi.

On 25 May, Lambin was taken from prison and placed in custody for the murders of Errachdi, Léca and Ludi. Although he vehemently denied the three charges against him, as he had done for the murder of Guerrée, Lambin was again charged with the murders of Errachdi and Léca and returned to Grasse prison. In August, Lambin was re-interrogated for the murder of Ludi and was again charged with murder. During his detention, Lambin was sent before the Alpes-Maritimes Assize Court with Fornasari, who was also charged in this murder case as the instigator. All remain in detention awaiting trial.

Originally scheduled for 2 to 13 November 2015, the trial for the murder of Robert Ludi was postponed several times due to Lambin's health condition. Suffering from paralysing sciatica, he was unable to be transported by plane to the Assize Court. Lambin requested his release on the grounds that his health was incompatible with his detention and that his 18-year prison sentence was coming to an end. Lambin's request for release was rejected in April 2016. On 16 June 2017, Lambin and Fornasari were discharged of the murders of Errachdi and Léca.

=== Trial for the murder of Robert Ludi ===
Lambin and Fornasari appeared before the Alpes-Maritimes Assize Court from 4 to 19 December 2017. During the trial, Lambin and Fornasari denied the murder of Robert Ludi for which they were being tried. After a two-week trial, Fornasari was sentenced to life imprisonment with a minimum term of 15 years, while Lambin was sentenced to life imprisonment with a minimum term of 22 years. Both appealed their convictions. The appeal trial was also postponed several times, notably due to the COVID-19 pandemic.

A few days before their trial on 6 April 2021, Lambin and Fornasari, who had been acquitted of the murders of Errachdi and Léca, had their acquittals overturned and were finally referred to the Alpes-Maritimes Assize Court. From 12 to 23 April, Lambin and Fornasari appeared on appeal before the Assize Court of Aix-en-Provence. At the end of their appeal trial, Lambin and Fornasari were again found guilty of the murder of Ludi and were both sentenced to life imprisonment with a minimum term of 22 years.

=== Trial for the murders of Errachdi and Léca ===
The trial of Michel Lambin and Émile Fornasari for the murders of Errachdi and Léca is expected to take place by 2025 before the Assize Court of the Alpes-Maritimes. No specific date has been set at this time.
