= Jean-Bernard Raimond =

French politician (1926–2016)

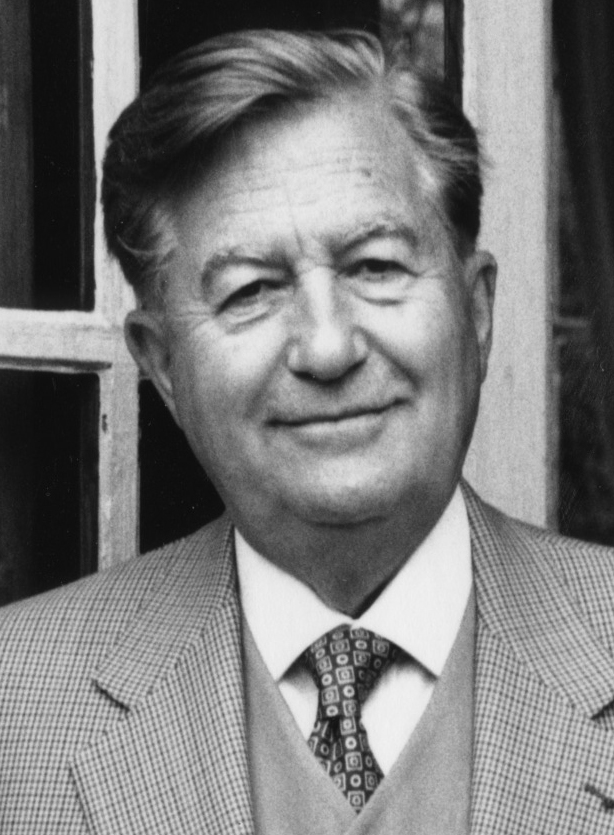

Minister of Foreign Affairs
- In office 20 March 1986 – 10 May 1988
- President: François Mitterrand
- Prime Minister: Jacques Chirac
- Preceded by: Roland Dumas
- Succeeded by: Roland Dumas

Member of the National Assembly for Bouches-du-Rhône's 14th constituency
- In office 1993–2002
- Preceded by: Jean-Pierre de Peretti
- Succeeded by: Maryse Joissains-Masini

Personal details
- Born: 6 February 1926 Paris, France
- Died: 7 March 2016 (aged 90) Neuilly-sur-Seine, France
- Party: RPR
- Education: École normale supérieure, ÉNA

Jean-Bernard Raimond (French pronunciation: [ʒɑ̃ bɛʁnaʁ ʁɛmɔ̃]; 6 February 1926 – 7 March 2016) was a conservative French politician who served as Foreign Minister in the government of Jacques Chirac from 1986 to 1988, as French ambassador to a number of states from the 1970s to the 1990s, and as a deputy in the French National Assembly from 1993 to 2002.

== Biography ==
Educated at the elite École Normale Supérieure (graduated 1947) and the École nationale d'administration, Raimond served in a variety of civil service positions with the French government, in 1967 he became a member of the staff of Maurice Couve de Murville, at the time the French Foreign Minister, and later to Louis de Guiringaud in 1978. He was ambassador to Morocco from 1973 to 1977, to Poland (1982–1984), to the Soviet Union (1985–1986) and to the Vatican (1988–1991). In between terms as ambassador, he served in various posts in the French Foreign Ministry, including his term as Foreign Minister from 1986 to 1988.

In 1993, he was elected to the French National Assembly as deputy for Bouches-du-Rhône (Aix-en-Provence) as a member of the Neo-Gaullist Rally for the Republic (RPR), and was reelected in 1997 for a term ending in 2002.

He was very active in Franco-Moroccan relations and is a member of a number of bilateral friendship committees, participated in non-governmental international colloquia, and wrote several books. Raimond was also the recipient of a number of French and foreign honours, including Officer of the Légion d'honneur, Commander of the Ordre national du Mérite, Chevalier des Palmes Académiques, Grand-cordon du Ouissam-Alaouite (Morocco), and the Grand Cross of the Order of Pius IX (Vatican).

== Bibliography ==
- Le Quai d'Orsay à l'épreuve de la cohabitation (Flammarion, 1989) – ISBN 2-08-066426-3
- Le Choix de Gorbatchev (Odile-Jacob, 1992) – ISBN 2-7381-0189-5
- Jean Paul II, un pape au cœur de l'histoire (Le Cherche-Midi, 1999) – ISBN 2-86274-999-0

Political offices
| Preceded by Roland Dumas | Minister of Foreign Affairs; 1986–1988 | Succeeded by Roland Dumas |
