= Pascale Martin =

French politician

Member of the National Assembly for Dordogne's 1st constituency
- In office 22 June 2022 – 18 July 2024
- Preceded by: Philippe Chassaing
- Succeeded by: Nadine Lechon

Personal details
- Born: 24 August 1961 (age 64) Dieppe, Seine-Maritime, France
- Party: L'Après (2024–present); La France Insoumise (before 2024)

Pascale Martin (born 24 August 1961) is a French politician from La France Insoumise who represented the Dordogne's 1st constituency in the National Assembly from 2022 to 2024. She was defeated for re-election by the National Rally's Nadine Lechon.

After Martin left parliament, she joined La France Insoumise breakaway group L'Après, resulting in her expulsion from La France Insoumise.

== See also ==
- List of deputies of the 16th National Assembly of France
