= Nadine Lechon =

French politician (born 1963)

- Nadine Lechon in 2026.

Member of the French National Assembly for Dordogne's 1st constituency
- Incumbent
- Assumed office 18 July 2024
- Preceded by: Pascale Martin

Personal details
- Born: 16 April 1963 (age 63) Sainte-Foy-la-Grande
- Party: National Rally

Nadine Lechon (born 16 April 1963) is a French farmer and politician of the National Rally. She was elected member of the National Assembly for Dordogne's 1st constituency in 2024.

== Biography ==
Lechon grew up in Monestier. She initially trained as an ambulance driver before owning a clothing store. Along with her husband, she established a winery and kiwi farm in Fleix. She has two children who both work as police officers.

She first joined the National Front (now National Rally) in 2006 and became interested in politics after participating in the 2024 French farmers' protests. During the snap 2024 French legislative election, she contested Dordogne's 1st constituency. She finished in first place during the initial round and narrowly defeated Pascale Martin of La France Insoumise during the second round.
