= Emergency Committee for Iraq =

The Emergency Committee for Iraq was formed by Ramsey Clark, Roland Dumas, Ahmed Ben Bella and Tun Mahathir Mohamad all former senior politicians, to strive to encourage respect for the rule of law in Iraq.

Formed June 17, 2005 the Emergency Committee for Iraq made public statements and held high-level meetings with international leaders as part of their efforts to ensure respect for the rule of law in Iraq. Part of their focus was to ensure a fair trial for former Iraqi President Saddam Hussein, and restoring the rule of law after the U.S. government's invasion of Iraq.

The group drew criticism in July 2005, when Ziad al-Khasawneh, Saddam Hussain's lawyer, resigned, citing interference from the group in the legal process. A high-profile member of the committee was part of Hussein's defence team.
