= Pascal Deguilhem =

French politician

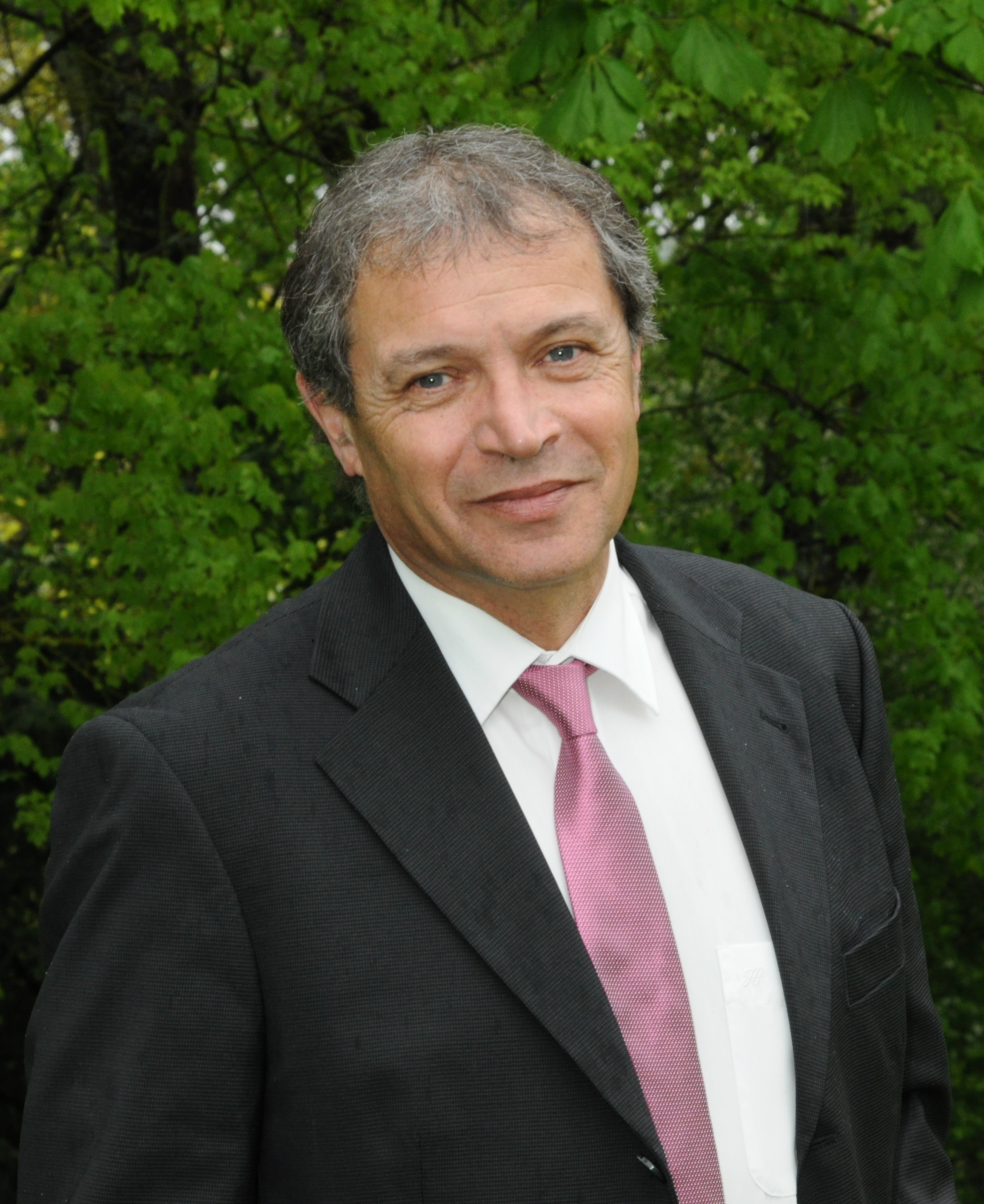
Portrait of Pascal Deguilhem

Pascal Deguilhem (born 9 February 1956 in Brouchaud) was a member of the National Assembly of France. He represented Dordogne's 1st constituency from 2007 to 2017 as a member of the Socialiste, radical, citoyen et divers gauche.
