= Pierre Mazeaud =

French jurist, politician and alpinist

President of the Constitutional Council
- In office 9 August 2004 – 16 May 2007
- Appointed by: Jacques Chirac
- Preceded by: Yves Guéna
- Succeeded by: Jean-Louis Debré

Secretary of State for Sports and Youth Affairs
- In office 1973–1976
- President: Georges Pompidou; Valéry Giscard d'Estaing
- Prime Minister: Pierre Messmer; Jacques Chirac
- Preceded by: Joseph Comiti
- Succeeded by: Jean-Pierre Soisson

Personal details
- Born: 24 August 1929 (age 97) Lyon, France
- Party: RPR
- Education: University of Paris

Pierre Mazeaud (French pronunciation: [pjɛʁ mazo]; born 24 August 1929) is a French jurist, politician and alpinist.

In February 2004, he was appointed president of the Constitutional Council of France by President of France Jacques Chirac, replacing Yves Guéna, until he was succeeded by Jean-Louis Debré in February 2007. He had been a member of the council since February 1998.

Pierre Mazeaud has a doctorate in law from the University of Paris (on marriage and the condition of the married woman in ancient Rome).

From 1961 to 1964, he was a member of the judiciary. In 1976, he became a counsellor in the Council of State, a position from which he retired on 25 August 1995. During the 1970s, he held subordinate governmental positions regarding sports. As a university student, Mazeaud was an active member of the Anarchist Federation. In the 1960s he entered electoral politics as a Gaullist.

Pierre Mazeaud's main hobby is alpinism, which he practiced at high level. On 11 July 1961, Mazeaud and other fellow climbers almost died in the Mont Blanc massif due to an unexpected storm.

On 15 October 1978 he became the first Frenchman to climb Mount Everest together with Jean Afanassieff, Nicolas Jaeger and Kurt Diemberger (from Austria).

== See also ==
- List of 20th-century summiters of Mount Everest
- List of Mount Everest records

Legal offices
Preceded by Maurice Faure	Member of the Constitutional Council; 1998–2007	Succeeded by Jean-Louis Debré
Preceded by Yves Guéna	President of the Constitutional Council; 2004–2007	Succeeded by Jean-Louis Debré
