= Roland Dumas =

French lawyer and politician (1922–2024)

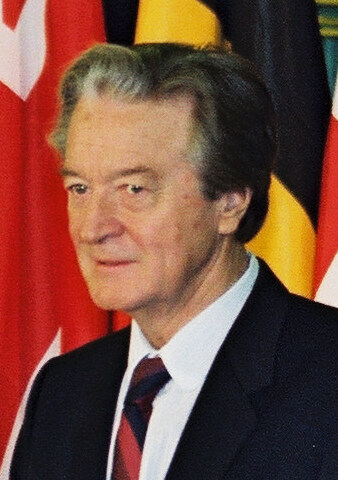
- Dumas in 1989

President of the Constitutional Council
- In office 8 March 1995 – 29 February 2000
- Appointed by: François Mitterrand
- Preceded by: Robert Badinter
- Succeeded by: Yves Guéna

Minister of Foreign Affairs
- In office 10 May 1988 – 28 March 1993
- President: François Mitterrand
- Prime Minister: Michel Rocard; Édith Cresson; Pierre Bérégovoy
- Preceded by: Jean-Bernard Raimond
- Succeeded by: Alain Juppé

Minister of External Affairs
- In office 7 December 1984 – 20 March 1986
- President: François Mitterrand
- Prime Minister: Laurent Fabius
- Preceded by: Claude Cheysson
- Succeeded by: Jean-Bernard Raimond

Personal details
- Born: 23 August 1922 Limoges, France
- Died: 3 July 2024 (aged 101) Paris, France
- Party: Socialist Party
- Spouse(s): Théodora Voultepsis; Anne-Marie Lillet
- Education: Sciences Po; London School of Economics

Roland Dumas (French pronunciation: [ʁɔlɑ̃ dyma]; 23 August 1922 – 3 July 2024) was a French lawyer and Socialist politician who served as Foreign Minister under President François Mitterrand from 1984 to 1986 and from 1988 to 1993. He was also President of the Constitutional Council from 1995 to 2000.

== Biography ==
=== Youth ===
Born in Limoges, Roland Dumas was the son of Élisabeth Lecanuet (1900–1964) and Georges Dumas (1895–1944), a civil servant in Limoges's region and Socialist resistant to the German Occupation during the Second World War. Shot at by the Gestapo, he conveyed weapons for the Resistance. Roland Dumas was arrested after organizing a boycott of the Berlin Philharmonic Orchestra by French students. After the war, he completed his law and political science studies in the Ecole libre des sciences politiques and the London School of Economics.

As a journalist and lawyer, he defended Jean Mons, Secretary-General of the Defence Committee, from charges of negligence in a case where Mons's assistant was accused of passing secrets of national security to communists. Because of this, he became close to François Mitterrand, president of the Democratic and Socialist Union of the Resistance (UDSR) party, himself suspected in the same scandal.

=== Politics ===
In 1956, he was elected deputy for Haute-Vienne department under the UDSR banner. He lost his seat in the 1958 legislative election, which followed the return of General Charles de Gaulle to power. He came back into the French National Assembly between 1967 and 1968 as representative of the Corrèze department. As a member of the renewed Socialist Party (PS) led by Mitterrand, he became deputy for Gironde in 1973, then for Dordogne on the occasion of the "pink wave" of 1981. In 1974, he acted as defence lawyer for Hilarion Capucci, who was prosecuted in Israel on charges of smuggling weapons into the country for the PLO.

When President Mitterrand appointed Laurent Fabius as Prime Minister in July 1984, Dumas joined the cabinet as Minister of European Affairs. Five months later, he replaced Foreign Minister Claude Cheysson. He remained in this position until the Socialist defeat in the March 1986 legislative election. Nevertheless, he returned to the Quai d'Orsay after the re-election of Mitterrand in May 1988, until the PS defeat in the March 1993 legislative elections. He was the French Foreign Minister during the collapse of the Soviet Bloc, the Gulf War, and the negotiations of the Maastricht Treaty.

After losing reelection to the French National Assembly in 1993, he was nominated for President of the Constitutional Council in 1995. Under his presidency, the body argued in favour of complete judicial immunity for the French President.

Dumas was a member of the Emergency Committee for Iraq.

In June 2013, during an appearance on the French news channel La Chaîne parlementaire, Dumas claimed that British officials had been preparing for intervention in Syria two years before the start of the Arab Spring. "I was in England two years before the violence in Syria on other business," he said. "I met with top British officials, who confessed to me that they were preparing something in Syria. This was in Britain not in America. Britain was organising an invasion of rebels into Syria."

=== Convictions ===
Accused in the Elf affair, he resigned from the Presidency of the Constitutional Council in January 1999.

Dumas' conviction for criticising a public prosecutor in his book was found unlawful by the European Court of Human Rights in 2010, by five votes to two.

In May 2007, Dumas received a 12-month jail sentence (suspended) for funds he mis-appropriated acting as executor of the will of the widow of Alberto Giacometti.

=== Controversial comments on Valls ===
In February 2015, Dumas suggested Prime Minister Manuel Valls was probably acting under Jewish "influence". During an interview on BFM-TV, Dumas stated that the prime minister "has personal alliances that mean he has prejudices... Everyone knows he is married to someone really good but who has an influence on him," an apparent reference to Valls' wife, Anne Gravoin, who is Jewish. When directly asked by a reporter if Valls "[was] under a Jewish influence?" Dumas responded, "Probably, I would think so." The Socialist Party subsequently released a statement declaring that Dumas's claims were "unworthy of a Socialist decorated by the Republic". Valls declined to comment on Dumas's claims, except to say that Dumas was "a man with a known past and his remarks which have done no credit to the Republic for a long time".

== Personal life and death ==
Dumas was married to Théodora Voultepsis, a former Miss Greece from 1951 through 1954, and to Anne-Marie Lillet, whom he married in 1961. (She was scion of the Lillet beverage family; they separated but never divorced.) Dumas turned 100 in August 2022, and died in Paris on 3 July 2024 at the age of 101.

== Political career ==
President of the Constitutional Council of France: 1995–2000 (Resignation).

Governmental functions

Minister for European Affairs: 1983–1984.

Minister of External Relations: 1984–1986.

Government spokesman: June–December 1984.

Minister of Foreign Affairs: 1988–1993.

Electoral mandates

National Assembly of France

Member of the National Assembly of France for Haute-Vienne: 1956–1958. Elected in 1956.

Member of the National Assembly of France for Corrèze: 1967–1968. Elected in 1967.

Member of the National Assembly of France for Dordogne: 1981–1983 (Became minister in 1983) / 1986–1988 (Became minister in 1988). Elected in 1981, reelected in 1986, 1988.

Political offices
Preceded by —	Minister of European Affairs; 1983–1984	Succeeded by —
Preceded by Claude Cheysson	Minister of External Affairs; 1984–1986	Succeeded by Jean-Bernard Raimond
Preceded by Jean-Bernard Raimond	Minister of Foreign Affairs; 1988–1993	Succeeded by Alain Juppé
Legal offices
Preceded by Robert Badinter	President of the Constitutional Council; 1995–2000	Succeeded by Yves Guéna
