= Constitutional Council (France) =

National constitutional ruling body of the French Republic

- Conseil constitutionnel
- Interactive map of Constitutional Council
- Jurisdiction: France
- Location: Paris
- Composition method: Presidential nomination with National Assembly and Senate confirmation
- Authorised by: Constitution of France
- Judge term length: 9 years (non-renewable)
- Number of positions: 9 + 2 former presidents of the Republic (de jure)
- Website: www.conseil-constitutionnel.fr

President of the Constitutional Council
- Currently: Richard Ferrand
- Since: 8 March 2025

The Constitutional Council (French: Conseil constitutionnel, [kɔ̃sɛj kɔ̃stitysjɔnɛl]) is the highest constitutional authority in France. It was established by the Constitution of the Fifth Republic on 4 October 1958 to ensure that constitutional principles and rules are upheld. It is housed in the Palais-Royal in Paris. Its main activity is to rule on whether proposed statutes conform with the Constitution, after they have been voted by Parliament and before they are signed into law by the president of the republic (a priori review), or passed by the government as a decree, which has law status in many domains, a right granted to the government under delegation of Parliament.

Since 1 March 2010, individual citizens who are party to a trial or a lawsuit have been able to ask for the council to review whether the law applied in the case is constitutional (a posteriori review). In 1971, the council ruled that conformity with the Constitution also entails conformity with two other texts referred to in the preamble of the Constitution, the Declaration of the Rights of Man and of the Citizen and the preamble of the constitution of the Fourth Republic, both of which list constitutional rights.

Members are referred to as les sages ("the wise") in the media and the general public, as well as in the council's own documents. Legal theorist Arthur Dyevre notes that this "tends to make those who dare criticise them look unwise". Since 2025, Richard Ferrand has served as President of the Constitutional Council (Président du Conseil constitutionnel) following his appointment by President Emmanuel Macron and subsequent confirmation.

== Powers and tasks ==
=== Overview ===
The Council has two main areas of power:

1. The first is the supervision of elections, both presidential and parliamentary, and ensuring the legitimacy of referendums (Articles 58, 59 and 60). They issue the official results, ensure proper conduct and fairness, and see that campaign spending limits are adhered to. The Council is the supreme authority in these matters. The Council can declare an election to be invalid if improperly conducted, the winning candidate used illegal methods, or the winning candidate spent more than the legal limits for the campaign.
2. The second area of council power is the interpretation of the fundamental meanings of the constitution, procedure, legislation, and treaties. The council can declare dispositions of laws to be contrary to the Constitution of France or to the principles of constitutional value that it has deduced from the Constitution or from the Declaration of the Rights of Man and of the Citizen. It also may declare laws to be in contravention of treaties that France has signed, such as the European Convention on Human Rights. Their declaring that a law is contrary to constitutional or treaty principles renders it invalid. The council also may impose reservations as to the interpretation of certain provisions in statutes. The decisions of the council are binding on all authorities.

Examination of laws by the council is compulsory for some acts, such as for organic bills, those which fundamentally affect government, and treaties, which need to be assessed by the council before they are considered ratified (Article 61-1 and 54). Amendments concerning the rules governing parliamentary procedures need to be considered by the council as well. Guidance may be sought from the council in regard to whether reform should come under statute law (voted by Parliament) or whether issues are considered as règlement (regulation) to be adopted with decree of the prime minister. The re-definition of legislative dispositions as regulatory matters initially constituted a significant share of the (then light) caseload of the council.

In the case of other statutes, seeking the oversight of the council is not compulsory. However, the president of the republic, the president of the Senate, the president of the National Assembly, the prime minister, 60 members of the National Assembly, or 60 Senators can submit a statute for examination by the council before its signing into law by the president. In general, it is the parliamentary opposition that brings laws that it deems to infringe civil rights before the council.

Another task, of lesser importance in terms of number of referrals, is the reclassification of statute law into the domain of regulations on the prime minister's request. This happens when the prime minister and his government wish to alter law that has been enacted as statute law, but should instead belong to regulations according to the Constitution. The prime minister has to obtain reclassification from the council prior to taking any decree changing the regulations. This, however, is nowadays only a small fraction of the council's activity: in 2008, out 140 of decisions, only 5 concerned reclassifications.

=== Enactment of legislation ===
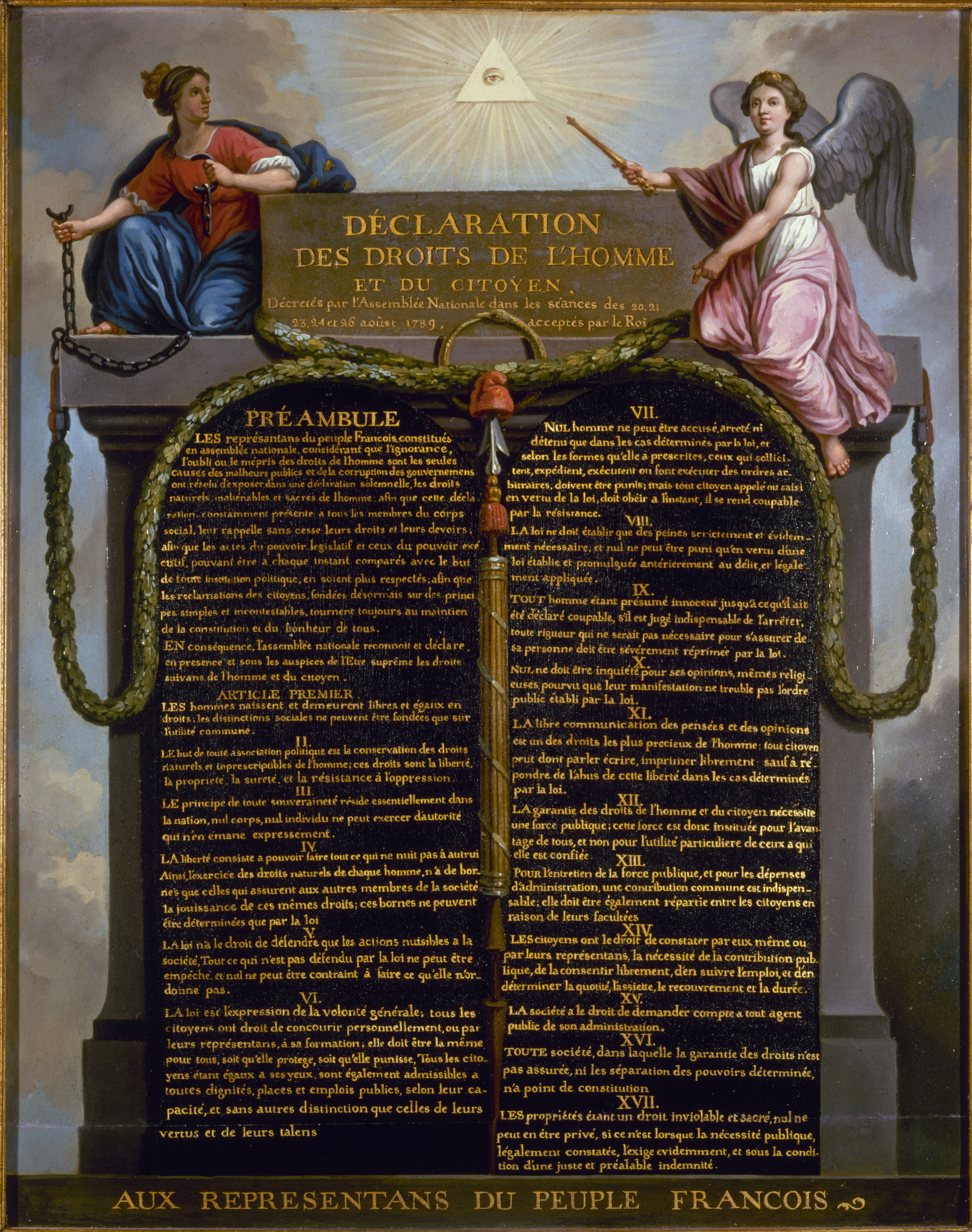
The 1789 Declaration of the Rights of Man and of the Citizen.

The Government of France consists of an executive branch (President of the Republic, prime minister, ministers and their services and affiliated organisations); a legislative branch (both houses of Parliament); and a judicial branch.

The judicial branch does not constitute a single hierarchy:

- Administrative courts fall under the Council of State,
- Civil and criminal courts under the Court of Cassation,
- Some entities also have advisory functions.

For historical reasons, there has long been political hostility in the nation to the concept of a "Supreme Court"—that is, a powerful court able to quash legislation, because of the experience of citizens in the pre-Revolutionary era.

Whether the Constitutional Council is a court is a subject of academic discussion, but some scholars consider it effectively the supreme court of France.

The Constitution of the French Fifth Republic distinguishes two kinds of legislation: statute law, which is normally voted upon by Parliament (except for ordonnances), and government regulations, which are enacted by the prime minister and his government as decrees and other regulations (arrêtés). Article 34 of the Constitution exhaustively lists the areas reserved for statute law: these include, for instance, criminal law.

Any regulation issued by the executive in the areas constitutionally reserved for statute law is unconstitutional unless it has been authorized by a statute as secondary legislation. Any citizen with an interest in the case can obtain the cancellation of these regulations by the Council of State, on grounds that the executive has exceeded its authority. Furthermore, the Council of State can quash regulations on grounds that they violate existing statute law, constitutional rights, or the "general principles of law".

In addition, new acts can be referred to the Constitutional Council by a petition just prior to being signed into law by the president of the republic. The most common circumstance for this is that 60 opposition members of the National Assembly, or 60 opposition members of the Senate request such a review.

If the prime minister thinks that some clauses of existing statute law instead belong to the domain of regulations, he can ask the council to reclassify these clauses as regulations.

Traditionally, France refused to accept the idea that courts could quash legislation enacted by Parliament (though administrative courts could quash regulations produced by the executive). This reluctance was based in the French revolutionary era: pre-revolutionary courts had often used their power to refuse to register laws and thus prevent their application for political purposes, and had blocked reforms. French courts were prohibited from making rulings of a general nature. Also, politicians believed that, if courts could quash legislation after it had been enacted and taken into account by citizens, there would be too much legal uncertainty: how could a citizen plan his or her actions according to what is legal or not if laws could a posteriori be found not to hold? Yet, in the late 20th century, courts, especially administrative courts, began applying international treaties, including law of the European Union, as superior to national law.

A 2009 reform, effective on 1 March 2010, enables parties to a lawsuit or trial to question the constitutionality of the law that is being applied to them. The procedure, known as question prioritaire de constitutionnalité, is broadly as follows: the question is raised before the trial judge and, if it has merit, is forwarded to the appropriate supreme court (Council of State if the referral comes from an administrative court, Court of Cassation for other courts). The supreme court collects such referrals and submits them to the Constitutional Council. If the Constitutional Council rules a law to be unconstitutional, this law is struck down from the law books. The decision applies to everyone and not only to the cases at hand.

== History and evolution ==
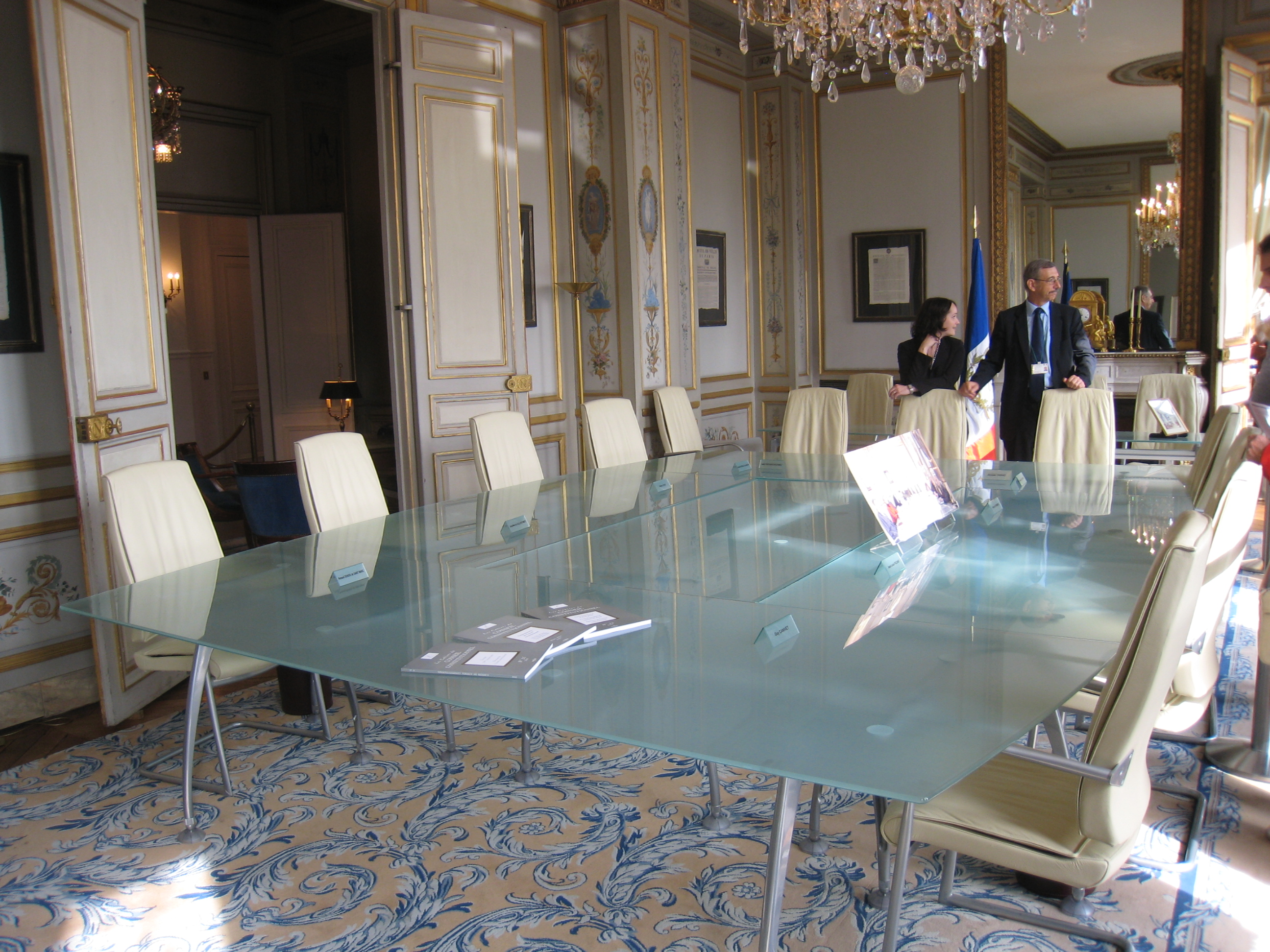
Meeting room

While since the 19th century the judicial review that the Constitutional Council brings to bear on the acts of the executive branch has played an increasingly large role, the politicians who have framed the successive French institutions have long been reluctant to have the judiciary review legislation. The argument was that un-elected judges should not be able to overrule directly the decisions of the democratically elected legislature. This may also have reflected the poor impression resulting from the political action of the parlements – courts of justice under the ancien régime monarchy: these courts often had chosen to block legislation in order to further the privileges of a small caste in the nation. The idea was that legislation was a political tool, and that the responsibility of legislation should be borne by the legislative body.

Originally, the council was meant to have rather technical responsibilities: ensuring that national elections were fair, arbitrating the division between statute law (from the legislative) and regulation (from the executive), etc. The council role of safekeeping fundamental rights was probably not originally intended by the drafters of the Constitution of the French Fifth Republic: they believed that Parliament should be able to ensure that it did not infringe on such rights. However, the council's activity has considerably extended since the 1970s, when questions of justice for larger groups of people became pressing.

From 1958 to 1970, under Charles de Gaulle's presidency, the Constitutional Council was sometimes described as a "cannon aimed at Parliament", protecting the executive branch against encroachment by statute law voted by Parliament. All but one referral to the Constitutional Council came from the prime minister, against acts of Parliament, and the council agreed to partial annulments in all cases. The only remaining referral came from the president of the Senate, Gaston Monnerville, against the 1962 referendum on direct election of the President of the Republic, which Charles de Gaulle supported. The Council ruled that it was "incompetent" to cancel the direct expression of the will of the French people.

In 1971, however, the Council ruled unconstitutional (Decision 71-44DC) some provisions of a law changing the rules for the incorporation of private nonprofit associations, because they infringed on freedom of association, one of the principles of the 1789 Declaration of the Rights of Man and of the Citizen; they used the fact that the preamble of the French constitution briefly referred to those principles to justify their decision. For the first time, a statute was declared unconstitutional not because it infringed on technical legal principles, but because it was deemed to infringe on personal freedoms of citizens.

In 1974, authority to request a constitutional review was extended to 60 members of the National Assembly or 60 senators. Soon, the political opposition seized that opportunity to request the review of all controversial acts.

The Council increasingly has discouraged "riders" (cavaliers) – amendments or clauses introduced into bills that have no relationship to the original topic of the bill; for instance, "budgetary riders" in the Budget bill, or "social riders" in the Social security budget bill. See legislative riders in France. In January 2005, Pierre Mazeaud, then president of the Constitutional Council, announced that the council would take a stricter view of language of a non-prescriptive character introduced in laws, sometimes known as "legislative neutrons". Instead of prescribing or prohibiting, as advocated by Portalis, such language makes statements about the state of the world, or wishes about what it should be.

Previously, such language was considered devoid of juridical effects and thus harmless; but Mazeaud contended that introducing vague language devoid of juridical consequences dilutes law unnecessarily. He denounced the use of law as an instrument of political communication, expressing vague wishes rather than effective legislation. Mazeaud also said that, because of the constitutional objective that law should be accessible and understandable, law should be precise and clear, and devoid of details or equivocal formulas. The practice of the Parliament putting into laws remarks or wishes with no clear legal consequences has been a long-standing concern of French jurists.

In 2004, one law out of two, including the budget, was sent to the council at the request of the opposition. In January 2005, Pierre Mazeaud, then president of the council, publicly deplored the inflation of the number of constitutional review requests motivated by political concerns, without much legal argumentation to back them on constitutional grounds.

The French constitutional law of 23 July 2008 amended article 61 of the Constitution. It now allows for courts to submit questions of unconstitutionality of laws to the Constitutional Council. The Court of Cassation (supreme court over civil and criminal courts) and the Council of State (supreme court over administrative courts) each filter the requests coming from the courts under them. Lois organiques, and other decisions organizing how this system functions, were subsequently adopted. The revised system was activated on 1 March 2010.

On 29 December 2012, the council said it was overturning an upper income tax rate of 75% due to be introduced in 2013. The council ruled on 28 March 2025 that politicians can be barred from office immediately if convicted of a crime, meaning opposition leader Marine Le Pen could be barred from the 2027 presidential election due to a embezzlement trial.

== Controversies ==
In 1995, Roland Dumas was appointed president of the Council by François Mitterrand. Dumas twice attracted major controversy. First, he was reported as party to scandals regarding the Elf Aquitaine oil company, with many details regarding his mistress, Christine Deviers-Joncour, and his expensive tastes in clothing being published in the press.

In this period, the council issued some highly controversial opinions in a decision related to the International Criminal Court, in Decision 98–408 DC, declaring that the sitting president of the republic could be tried criminally only by the High Court of Justice, a special court organized by Parliament and originally meant for cases of high treason. This, in essence, ensured that Jacques Chirac would not face criminal charges until he left office. This controversial decision is now moot, since the Parliament redefined the rules of responsibility of the president of the republic by the French constitutional law of 23 July 2008. In 1999, because of the Elf scandal, Dumas took official leave from the Council and Yves Guéna assumed the interim presidency.

In 2005, the council again attracted some controversy when Valéry Giscard d'Estaing and Simone Veil campaigned for the proposed European Constitution, which was submitted to the French voters in a referendum. Simone Veil had participated in the campaign after obtaining a leave of absence from the council. This action was criticized by some, including Jean-Louis Debré, president of the National Assembly, who thought that prohibitions against appointed members of the council conducting partisan politics should not be evaded by their taking leave for the duration of a campaign. Veil defended herself by pointing to precedent; she said, "How is that his [Debré's] business? He has no lesson to teach me."

In 2025, council president Richard Ferrand’s nomination by Emmanuel Macron was met with widespread criticism from the opposition and legal scholars due to his particularly close relationship with the president and limited legal training. He was confirmed by one vote.

== Membership ==
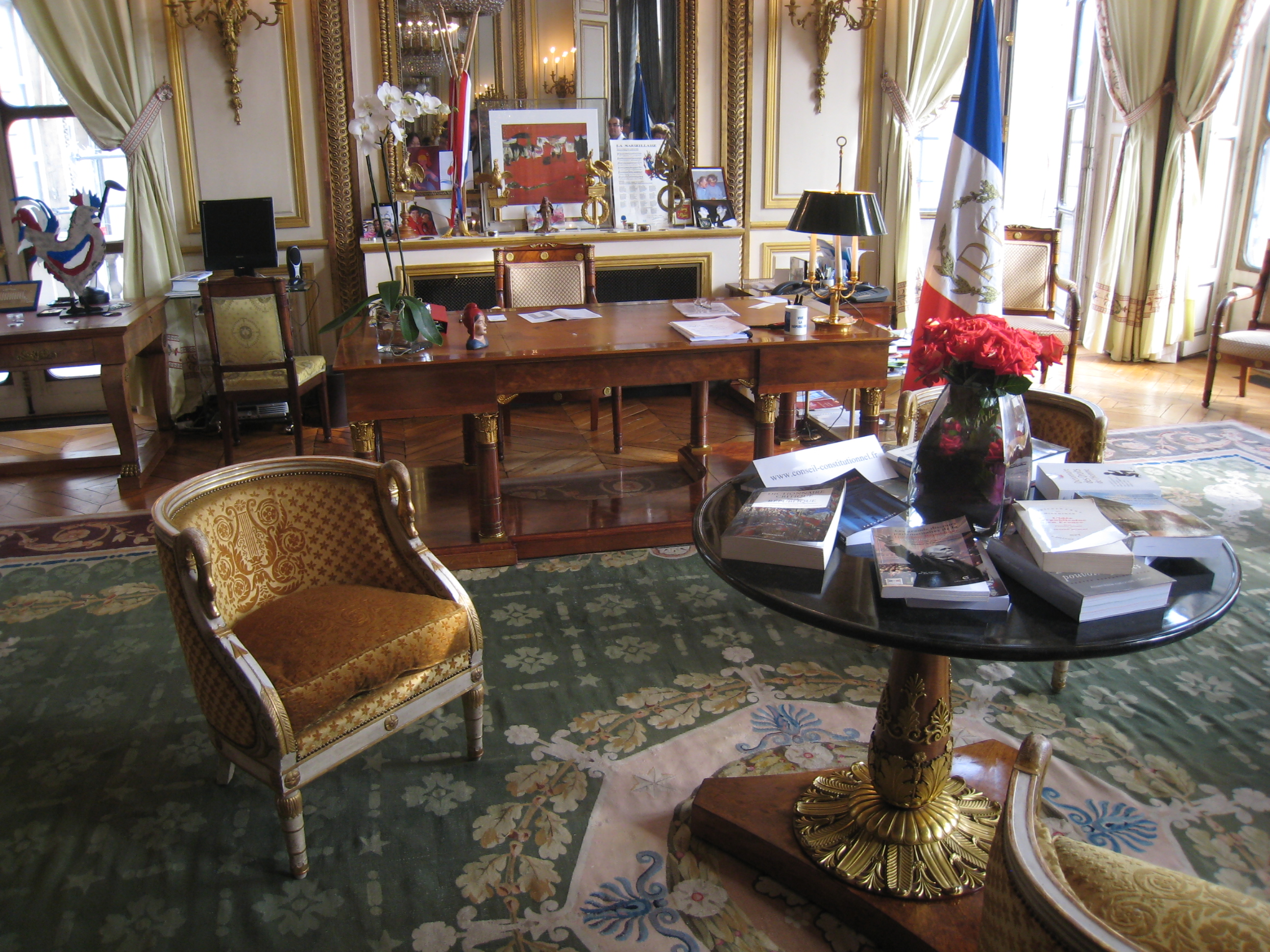
Office of the President of the French Constitutional Council

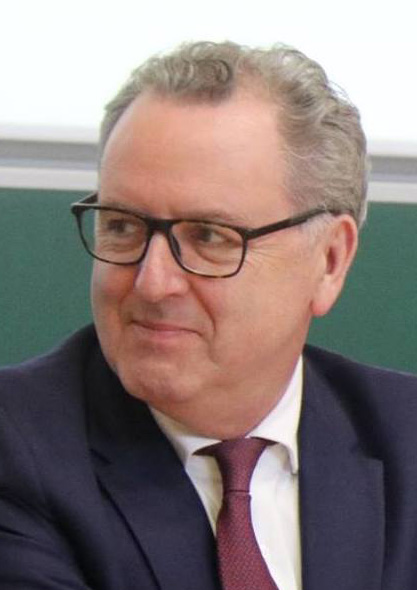
Richard Ferrand, current President of the Constitutional Council

The council is made up of former Presidents of the Republic who have chosen to sit in the Council (which they may not do if they become directly involved in politics again) and nine other members who serve non-renewable terms of nine years, one third of whom are appointed every three years, three each by the president of the republic, the president of the National Assembly and the president of the Senate. The president of the Constitutional Council is selected by the president of the republic for a term of nine years. If the position becomes vacant, the oldest member becomes interim president.

Following the 2008 constitutional revision, appointments that the president of the republic makes to the council are subject to a parliamentary approval process, where the relevant committee in the Senate and the National Assembly votes on the appointee. If greater than three-fifths of the members of either committee vote against confirming the appointee, then the appointee must be withdrawn by the president of the republic.

A quorum of seven members is imposed unless exceptional circumstances are noted. Votes are by majority of the members present at the meeting; the president of the council has a casting vote in case of an equal split. For decisions about the incapacity of the president of the republic, a majority of the members of the council is needed.

=== Current members ===
The members of the Constitutional Council are sworn in by the president of the republic. Former presidents have the option to sit if they choose to do so. The members of the Constitutional Council should abstain from partisanship. They should refrain from making declarations that could lead them to be suspected of partisanship. The possibility for former presidents to sit in the council is a topic of moderate controversy; some see it as incompatible with the absence of partisanship. René Coty, Vincent Auriol, Valéry Giscard d'Estaing, Jacques Chirac and Nicolas Sarkozy are the only former Presidents of France to have sat in the Constitutional Council.

==== Sitting members ====
As of 2025, the current sitting members of the Constitutional Council are:

Current sitting members of the Constitutional Council
Member	Age	Appointer	Appointed by	Mandate		Ref.
Member	Age	Appointer	Appointed by	Start	End	Ref.
Richard Ferrand (President)	62 years old	President of the Republic	Emmanuel Macron	8 March 2025	8 March 2034	
Alain Juppé	81 years old	President of the Republic	Emmanuel Macron	11 March 2019	10 March 2028	
Jacqueline Gourault	75 years old	President of the Republic	Emmanuel Macron	14 March 2022	13 March 2031	
Jacques Mézard	78 years old	President of the National Assembly	Richard Ferrand	11 March 2019	10 March 2028	
Véronique Malbec	67 years old	President of the National Assembly	Richard Ferrand	14 March 2022	13 March 2031	
Laurence Vichnievsky	71 years old	President of the National Assembly	Yaël Braun-Pivet	8 March 2025	7 March 2034	
Phillipe Bas	66 years old	President of the Senate	Gérard Larcher	8 March 2025	8 March 2034	
François Pillet	76 years old	President of the Senate	Gérard Larcher	11 March 2019	10 March 2028	
François Seners	68 years old	President of the Senate	Gérard Larcher	14 March 2022	13 March 2031	

==== Non-sitting members ====
As of 2020, the following members do not sit but can if they choose to:

Current non-sitting members of the Constitutional Council
Member	Since	Sat from		Capacity	Notes	Ref.
Nicolas Sarkozy	May 2012	May 2012	July 2013	Former presidents.		
François Hollande	May 2017	N/A		Former presidents.	Has pledged to never sit on the Constitutional Council	

=== President of the Constitutional Council ===
As of 2025, the following individuals have served as President of the Constitutional Council:

List of successive presidents of the Constitutional Council
President		Tenure		Tenure length	Appointed by	Ref.
1	Léon Noël (1888–1987)	5 March 1959	5 March 1965	6 years, 0 days	Charles de Gaulle	
2	Gaston Palewski (1901–1984)	5 March 1965	5 March 1974	9 years, 0 days	Charles de Gaulle	
3	Roger Frey (1913–1997)	5 March 1974	4 March 1983	8 years, 364 days	Georges Pompidou	
4	Daniel Mayer (1909–1996)	4 March 1983	4 March 1986	3 years, 0 days	François Mitterrand	
5	Robert Badinter (1928–2024)	4 March 1986	4 March 1995	9 years, 0 days	François Mitterrand	
6	Roland Dumas (1922–2024)	8 March 1995	1 March 2000	4 years, 359 days	François Mitterrand	
7	Yves Guéna (1922–2016)	1 March 2000	9 March 2004	4 years, 8 days	Jacques Chirac	
8	Pierre Mazeaud (born 1929)	9 March 2004	3 March 2007	2 years, 359 days	Jacques Chirac	
9	Jean-Louis Debré (1944–2025)	5 March 2007	4 March 2016	8 years, 365 days	Jacques Chirac	
10	Laurent Fabius (born 1946)	8 March 2016	8 March 2025	9 years, 0 days	François Hollande	
11	Richard Ferrand (born 1962)	8 March 2025	Incumbent	1 year, 177 days	Emmanuel Macron	

== Publications ==
Titre VII
- Discipline: Constitutional law
- Language: French

Publication details
- Former names: Les Nouveaux Cahiers du Conseil constitutionnel Les Cahiers du Conseil constitutionnel
- History: 1996: established. 2018: present format.
- Publisher: Constitutional Council (France)
- Frequency: 2/year
- Open access: Yes

Standard abbreviations
- ISO 4: Titre VII

Indexing
- ISSN: 2647-6614
- 2010–2018
- ISSN: 1253-2177 (print); 1777-5531 (web)
- 1996–2010
- ISSN: 2112-2679 (print); 1968-3820 (web)

Links
- Journal homepage; Online archive 2018–present; Online archive 1996–2018

The council created a periodical in 1996, Les Cahiers du Conseil constitutionnel, from October 2010 (No. 29) Les Nouveaux Cahiers du Conseil constitutionnel.

This was done in view of a better communication over the council's decisions, especially following the 1993 controversy over the decision to strike down a government bill on the right of asylum, during which Prime Minister Édouard Balladur had publicly attacked the institution. Decisions of the council traditionally include an extremely short and purely formal judicial opinion, often relying of plain statements if not tautologies, leaving its rationale and its use of principles and precedents open to interpretation. Before 1996, secretaries general occasionally contributed articles in law reviews in order to clarify the council's intents. Starting in 1996, the Cahiers "Decisions and Documents of the Constitutional Council" section included analyses of recent decisions, formally called "commentaries" from November 2008.

Commentaries became extensive, widely read and used by the legal community and the media. They are written by the council's Legal Office and secretary general, and unsigned; they are not approved by the council itself, although the office and secretary general assist with the bulk of the legal research for its decisions. They do not have the force of law, although they are increasingly mentioned in arguments before the council, and occasionally in lower courts. Since 2010, they are no longer published in the subsequent issue of the periodical, but online at the same time as the decision. They are however still commonly referred to as the "Cahiers commentaries" (commentaires aux Cahiers).

The purpose of the Cahiers, as summed up by its then-editor, was also to "express the policy of dialogue of the Constitutional Council with academia as well as with foreign courts". Each issue included a special feature, as well as an article on a foreign constitutional court, authored by legal scholars and researchers. With the separate publication of commentaries from 2010, it was more clearly turned into a law journal, upon which it became the Nouveaux Cahiers. It ran until April 2018, with two to four issues every year, published both in print and online.

In September 2018, it was succeeded by Titre VII, named after title VII of the Constitution, which establishes the council. Publication is exclusively digital, on the council's website and on the Cairn.info portal. Two issues are published every year, in the spring and autumn.

The council has released annual reports (rapports d’activité) since 2016, in French and English.

== Location ==
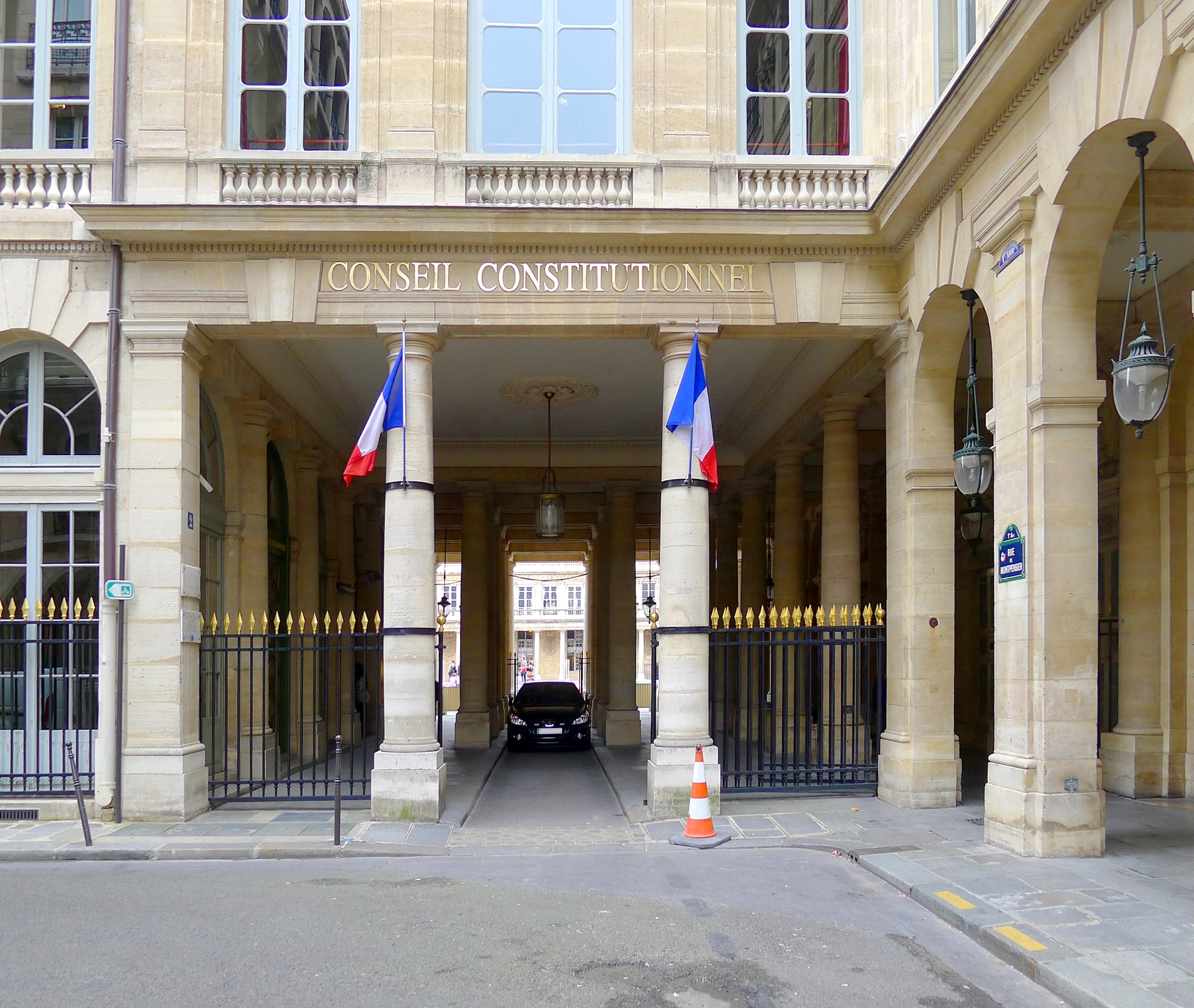
Palais Royal entrance to the Constitutional Council from Rue de Montpensier

The council sits in the Palais-Royal (which also houses the Ministry of Culture) in Paris near the Council of State.

== See also ==
- Constitutional economics
- Constitutionalism
- Cour de cassation, highest judicial court in France
- Conseil d'Etat, supreme court for administrative justice in France
- Court of cassation, general discussion, mostly dealing with common law jurisdictions
- Court of Appeal (France)—Court of Appeal in France. Differs considerably from appeals process in common law countries, in particular, certain types of court cases are appealed to courts called something other than "court of appeal"
- Cour d'appel – redirect to Court of Appeal (France)
- Court of Appeal, Court of Appeals—redirect to Appellate court, the courts of second instance and appeals process in common law countries, which differs considerably from French appeal process
- Judiciary
- Judiciary of France
- Jurisprudence
- Ministère public, shares some but not all characteristics of the prosecutor in common law jurisdictions. In France the procureur is considered a magistrate and investigations are typically carried out by a juge d'instruction
- Police Tribunal (France)
- Rule According to Higher Law
- Tribunal correctionnel (France)
- Criminal responsibility in French law
- General principles of French Law
