= Yves Guéna =

French politician (1922–2016)

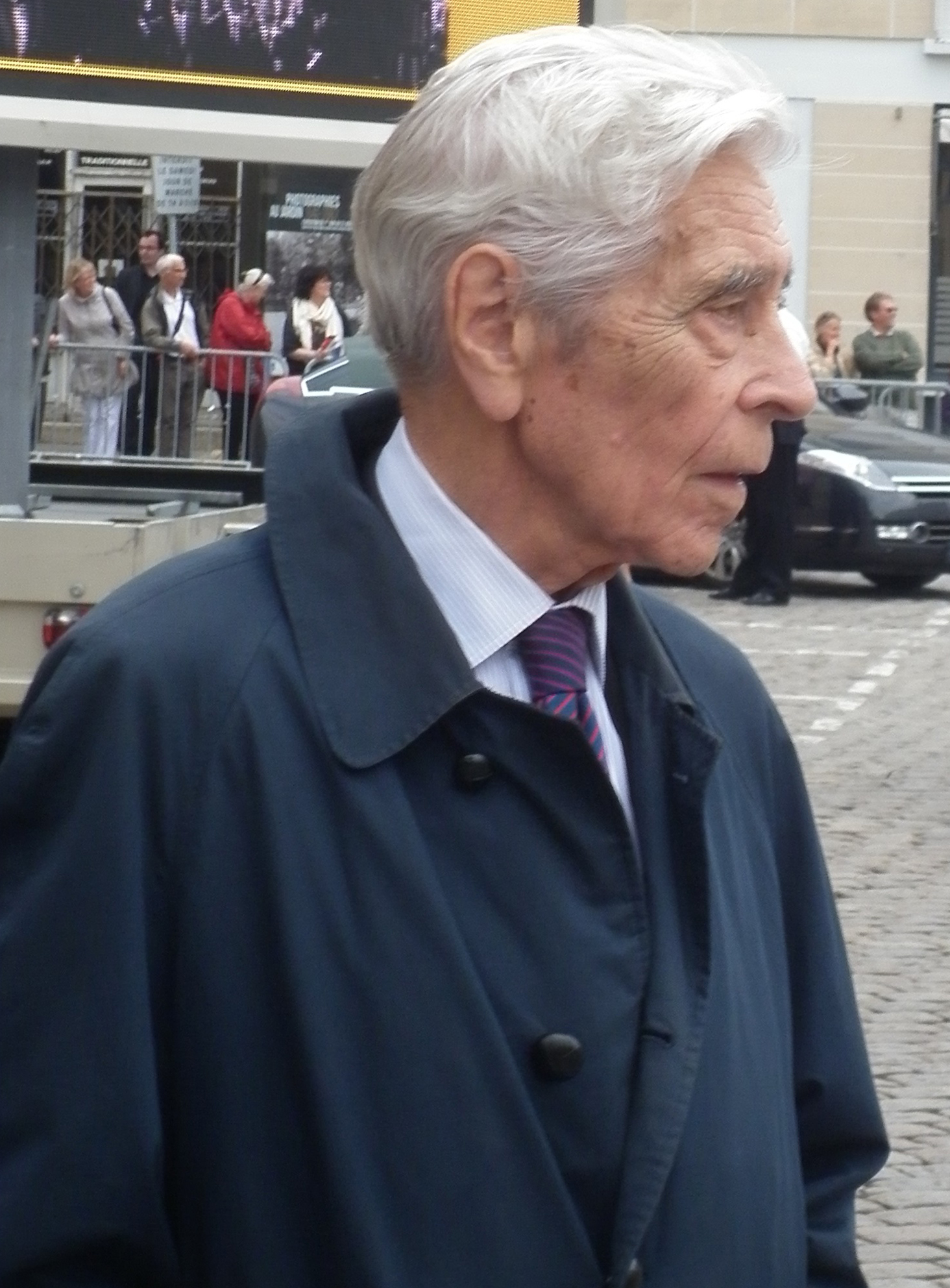

President of the Constitutional Council
- In office 1 March 2000 – 9 August 2004
- Appointed by: Jacques Chirac
- Preceded by: Roland Dumas
- Succeeded by: Pierre Mazeaud

Member of the Constitutional Council
- In office 20 January 1997 – 9 August 2004
- Appointed by: René Monory
- President: Roland Dumas; Himself
- Preceded by: Étienne Dailly
- Succeeded by: Jacqueline de Guillenchmidt

Mayor of Périgueux
- In office 26 March 1971 – 20 January 1997
- Preceded by: Lucien Barrière
- Succeeded by: Xavier Darcos

Minister of Posts and Telecommunications
- In office 12 July 1968 – 20 June 1969
- President: Charles de Gaulle; Alain Poher (acting)
- Prime Minister: Maurice Couve de Murville
- Preceded by: André Bettencourt
- Succeeded by: Robert Galley
- In office 6 April 1967 – 31 May 1968
- President: Charles de Gaulle
- Prime Minister: Georges Pompidou
- Preceded by: Jacques Marette
- Succeeded by: André Bettencourt

Minister of Information
- In office 31 May 1968 – 10 July 1968
- President: Charles de Gaulle
- Prime Minister: Georges Pompidou
- Preceded by: Georges Gorse
- Succeeded by: Joël Le Theule

Personal details
- Born: Yves René Henri Guéna; 6 July 1922 Brest, France
- Died: 3 March 2016 (aged 93) 16th arrondissement of Paris, France
- Party: UDR
- Education: ÉNA

Yves Guéna (French pronunciation: [iv ɡena]; 6 July 1922 – 3 March 2016) was a French politician. In 1940, he joined the Free French Forces in the United Kingdom. He received several decorations for his courage.

== Political life ==
First elected under the banner of the left wing Gaullist Democratic Union of Labour, he later belonged to various right-wing parties: Union pour la nouvelle République (1962–1968), the Union of Democrats for the Republic (1968–1978) and the Rally for the Republic (1978–1997).

He occupied several posts as minister. In 1968, he was Minister of Information. He was a member of the Parliament between 1962 and 1981 and then again between 1986 and 1988. He was a senator between 1989 and 1997.

In 2000, Guéna was named president of the Constitutional Council of France. In 2004 he left to become president of the Arab World Institute until 2007.
