= Éric Dupond-Moretti =

French-Italian politician and lawyer (born 1961)

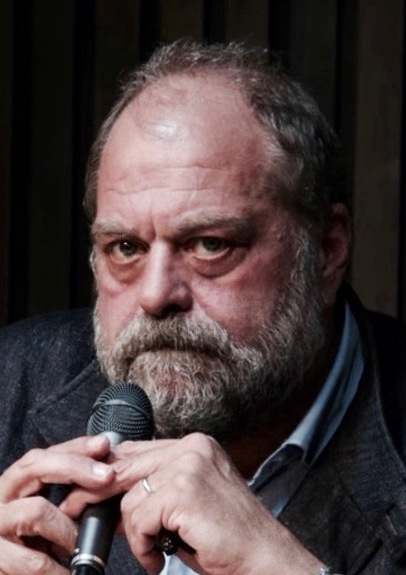
- Dupond-Moretti in 2018

Keeper of the Seals, Minister of Justice
- In office 6 July 2020 – 21 September 2024
- Prime Minister: Jean Castex; Élisabeth Borne; Gabriel Attal
- Preceded by: Nicole Belloubet
- Succeeded by: Didier Migaud

Personal details
- Born: Éric Paul Dupond; 20 April 1961 (age 65) Maubeuge, France
- Citizenship: France; Italy
- Spouse: Hélène Dupond-Moretti (m. 1991; div. 2016)
- Domestic partner: Isabelle Boulay (2016–present)
- Children: 2
- Education: University of Lille
- Occupation: Criminal defence lawyer

Éric Paul Dupond-Moretti (French: [eʁik dypɔ̃mɔʁeti]; born 20 April 1961) is a French-Italian lawyer and politician who served as Minister of Justice from 2020 to 2024 in the successive governments of Prime Ministers Jean Castex, Élisabeth Borne and Gabriel Attal. As a criminal defence lawyer, he is renowned for his number of acquittals which earned him the nickname "Acquitator", some of the controversial figures he defended, as well as his outspoken personality.

During his tenure as Justice Minister, he was one of the most prominent members of the government. His appointment came as a surprise to many political commentators.

== Early life ==
Dupond-Moretti is the only son of Jean-Pierre Dupond, a metal worker from Avesnois and Elena Moretti, a housekeeper from Italy. His paternal grandparents, Achille and Louise, were also workers. Fatherless at the age of four, his mother raised him alone. Like many famous fatherless criminal lawyers in France, most notably Robert Badinter, his childhood gave him a sense of injustice.

Dupond-Moretti attended secondary school at the Institution Saint-Pierre in Fourmies, and the Catholic Lycée Notre-Dame in Valenciennes where he obtained his baccalauréat.

He then studied law at the University of Lille.

== Career ==
=== Defense lawyer ===
After taking his oath as a lawyer on 11 December 1984 in Douai, Dupond-Moretti enrolled at the bar of Lille. Working for a Lille law firm, he began his career in the Labour Courts and then as a court appointed lawyer under the mentorship of Lille lawyer Jean Descamps and Toulouse lawyer Alain Furbury, before opening his own law firm in Lille.

For his results (more than 145 acquittals in 2019), Dupond-Moretti is nicknamed "Acquittator" (acquittor + matador) in the courtrooms. Notable clients have included aid group Zoé's Ark, Jérôme Kerviel and Julian Assange, but also Patrick Balkany, Karim Benzema, Georges Tron and the brother of terrorist Mohammed Merah.

Dupond-Moretti chaired the support committee for incumbent Socialist Mayor Martine Aubry in the 2008 municipal election in Lille. He also signed a letter in her favour in Libération before the 2011 Socialist Party presidential primary in which she placed second.

==== Publications ====
- with Stéphane Durand-Souffland, Bête noire, Éditions Michel Lafon, 2012
- with Loïc Sécher, Le Calvaire et le Pardon, Michel Lafon, 2013
- with Stéphane Durand-Souffland, Directs du droit , Michel Lafon, 2017

=== Minister of Justice (2020–2024) ===
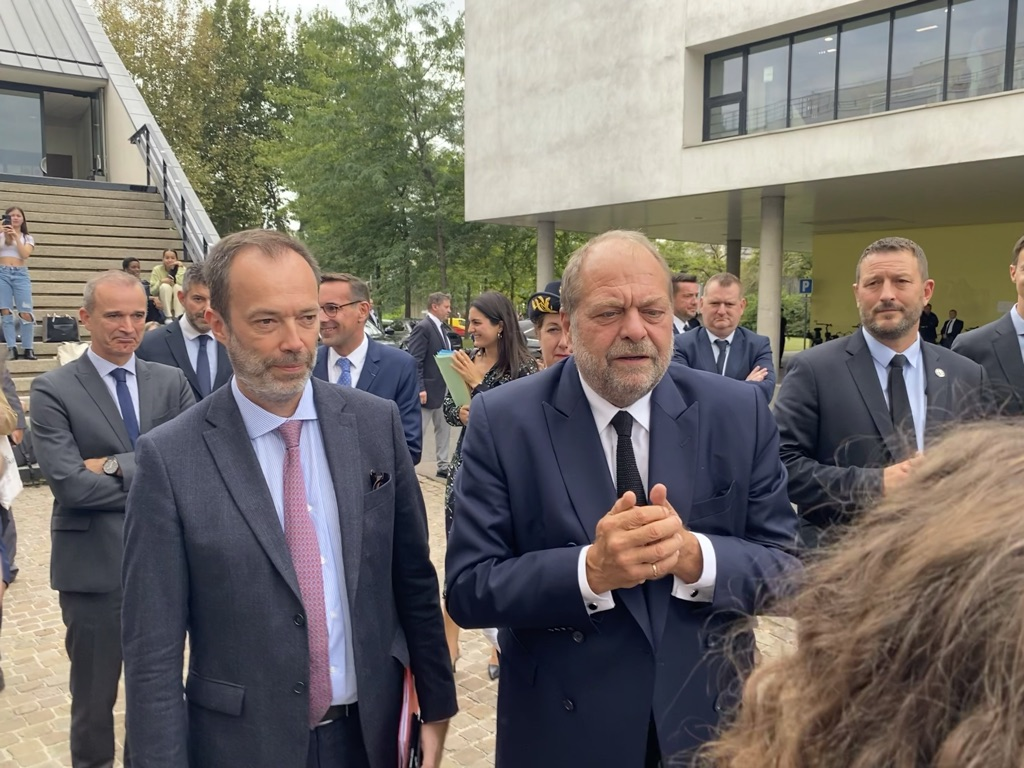
Dupond-Moretti about to deliver a lecture

On 6 July 2020, Dupond-Moretti was named Minister of Justice and Keeper of the Seals of France by President Emmanuel Macron in the government of Prime Minister Jean Castex.

In 2021 Dupond-Moretti successfully defended a bill in front of the French Parliament in order to strengthen the severity of the sentencing process, stating the judiciary response to minor offenses was "too weak to be effective".

In 2021, Macron directed Dupond-Moretti and Secretary of State for Child Protection Adrien Taquet to develop proposals for tightening laws regarding child sexual abuse after a high-profile scandal involving prominent pundit Olivier Duhamel.

In 2021 Dupond-Moretti oversaw a sharp increase in the budget devoted to the judiciary system following reports of lengthy procedures.

In the 2021 regional election, the La République En Marche! list led by Laurent Pietraszewski in the northern region of Hauts-de-France on which Dupond-Moretti was placed was eliminated in the first round of voting. It garnered less than 10 percent of the vote and failed to win a single seat.

Later in 2021, Dupond-Moretti was placed under investigation by the Cour de Justice de la République (CJR) over allegations he had used his ministerial position to settle scores with judges who had investigated some of his more prominent clients and friends, including former President Nicolas Sarkozy.

In late 2022, Dupond-Moretti's position as Minister of Justice came under scrutiny amid the Lola affair, which saw a teenager murdered in Paris by an Algerian illegal immigrant. In Parliament, Éric Pauget of The Republicans held the Ministry of Justice "responsible" for the murder as it failed to have the perpetrator deported prior to the murder.

== Political positions ==
In 2013, Dupond-Moretti refused the Legion of Honour.

Yes, I am a free man. I am proud of being a lawyer, of refusing the Legion of Honour and the Freemasonry, of saying whatever I want to say.

— Éric Dupond-Moretti

In May 2015, Dupond-Moretti declared his support for banning the National Front.

In August 2020, Dupond-Moretti signed a preface to a book written by head of the national federation of hunters Willy Schraen, in which he mocked "environment ayatollahs". His comments, written before his appointment as a government minister, caused an uproar, forcing him to backtrack.

== Personal life ==
In 1991, Dupond-Moretti married Hélène, a juror he met during a trial; they have two children. Now divorced, he has been in a relationship with singer Isabelle Boulay since April 2016.

A hunter, Dupond-Moretti owns a Flemish farmhouse with retrievers and trained birds for falconry.

=== Cinematic appearances ===
- Dupond-Moretti appeared as himself in the Claire Denis film Bastards (2013 film).
- He also played a judge in the Claude Lelouch film Everyone's Life (2017).

Political offices
Preceded by Nicole Belloubet	Minister of Justice; 2020–2024	Succeeded by Didier Migaud
