= July 2023 French government reshuffle =

French government reshuffle undertaken by Emmanuel Macron

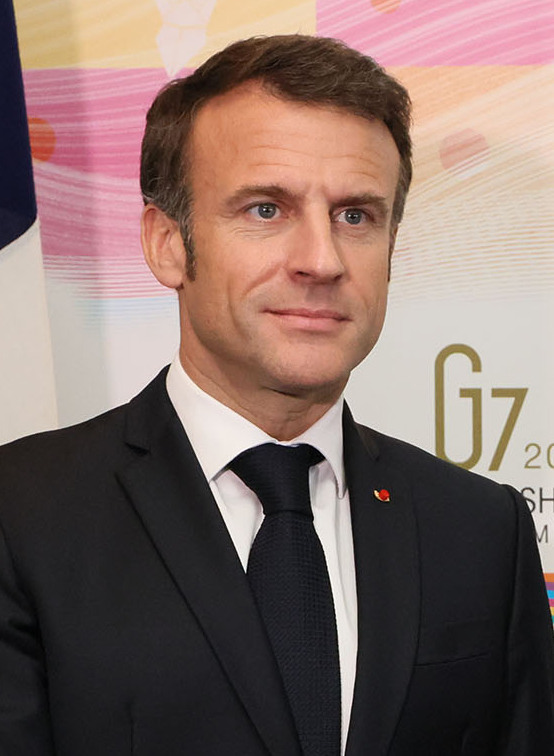
Emmanuel Macron

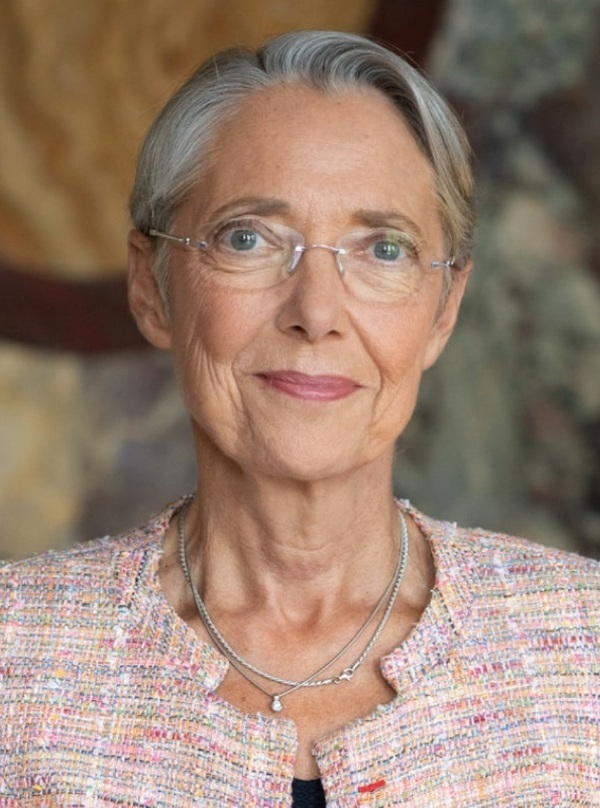
Élisabeth Borne

Emmanuel Macron carried out the second major reshuffle of his minority government, led by Prime Minister Élisabeth Borne, in July 2023. Following the "hundred days of appeasement and action" Macron called for in April 2023, the reshuffle had been highly anticipated and briefed in the press. There were reports of a potential change of prime minister and likely removal of ministers who had not drawn enough attention to their departments' policies or ministers who had underperformed the President's expectations. The reshuffle was seen as an opportunity for Macron to "reset" his presidency, after the contentious passage of a pension system reform and the 2023 French riots, and reassert his authority, significantly diminished following the result of the legislative election the previous year. Despite expectations that the reshuffle was to be pivotal to the rest of Macron's second term and that it would indicate a clear, fresh political direction for the country, few changes to the cabinet's composition were made and, crucially, Borne retained her position as head of government. Overall, the operation was interpreted as a fallback reshuffle, in the sense that the President sought to close ranks around his leadership by rewarding loyalist politicians, pushing out civil society figures and minimally altering existing political balances inside his Cabinet. Nevertheless, the removal of education minister Pap Ndiaye was seen as a concession to conservative and far-right critics.

It was widely reported that Macron and his prime minister disagreed over the scope of the government reshuffle and the manner of "staging" it: Borne reportedly argued in favor of substantial changes to the ministerial line-up while Macron favored carrying out a "technical" reshuffle. Likewise, Borne reportedly wanted to make her retention of the premiership a political event by resigning, being reappointed and subsequently forming a new cabinet, so that it could strengthen her position in the face of cabinet rivals: Macron chose instead to announce his decision to keep her as PM through press reports followed by a confirmation of those reports by his entourage, an unprecedented manner to unveil such a key decision under the Fifth Republic.

== Cabinet-level changes ==
Colour key
- Joined the Cabinet
- Left the Cabinet
- Portfolio renamed

Minister	Position before reshuffle	Result of reshuffle
Pap Ndiaye	Minister of National Education and Youth	Left the government
François Braun	Minister of Health and Prevention	Left the government
Jean-Christophe Combe	Minister for Solidarity, Autonomy and the Disabled	Left the government
Gabriel Attal	Deputy Minister for Public Accounts	Promoted to become Minister of National Education and Youth
Aurelien Rousseau	Chief of Staff to the Prime minister	Promoted to become Minister of Health and Prevention
Aurore Bergé	President of the Renaissance group in the National Assembly	Promoted to become Minister for Solidarity and Family

== Junior ministerial changes ==
Colour key
- Promoted (Note: According to the ministerial order of precedence: Minister of State > Minister > Deputy Minister > State Secretary)
- Left the government

Minister	Position before reshuffle	Result of reshuffle
Jean-François Carenco	Deputy Minister for the Overseas	Left the government
Olivier Klein	Deputy Minister for Cities and Housing	Left the government, office abolished
Geneviève Darrieussecq	Deputy Minister for People with Disabilities	Resigned from government
Isabelle Lonvis-Rome	Deputy Minister for Gender Equality, Diversity and Equal Opportunities	Left the government
Marlène Schiappa	State Secretary for the Social and Solidarity Economy and Associative Life	Sacked from government over the "Marianne Fund" scandal, office abolished
Bérangère Couillard	State Secretary for Ecology	Promoted to become Deputy Minister for Gender Equality, Diversity and Equal Opportunities, previous portfolio renamed
Thomas Cazenave	Member of the National Assembly for Gironde's 1st constituency	Promoted to become Deputy Minister for Public Accounts
Philippe Vigier	Member of the National Assembly for Eure-et-Loir's 4th constituency	Promoted to become Deputy Minister for the Overseas
Patrice Vergriete	Mayor of Dunkirk	Promoted to become Deputy Minister for Housing, office established
Fadila Khattabi	Chair of the Social Affairs Committee	Promoted to become Deputy Minister for People with Disabilities
Sabrina Agresti-Roubache	Member of the National Assembly for Bouches-du-Rhône's 1st constituency	Promoted to become State Secretary for Cities, office established
Prisca Thévenot	Member of the National Assembly for Hauts-de-Seine's 8th constituency	Promoted to become State Secretary for Youth and National Universal Service
Sarah El Haïry	State Secretary for Youth and National Universal Service	Moved to become State Secretary for Biodiversity

== Reaction and analysis ==
The government reshuffle carried out jointly by Macron and Borne was widely criticized by the press as one of the most "chaotic", "strange" and "failed" reshuffles in the history of the Fifth Republic: conservative newspaper Le Figaro branded the reshuffle as "half way between François Hollande and the Fourth Republic", criticizing "a lot of noise for nothing"; centre-left Le Monde newspaper criticized a "painful" and "strange" reshuffle for a government "without any roadmap"; left-wing Libération newspaper branded the July 2023 reshuffle as "narrow" and as bearing no "political message", a reshuffle coming after "three days of mess" and insufficient to erase "rumors of disagreements between the President and his Prime minister". Reuters described the reshuffle as a proof of Macron's "limited room for manoeuvre" since he lost his parliamentary majority barely one month into his second term.

=== Opposition parties ===
Marine Le Pen, far-right National Rally (RN) parliamentary party leader, said that the reshuffle was a proof of Macron's "tragic disconnection", while Mathilde Panot, far-left Unbowed France (LFI-NUPES) parliamentary group leader that "the casting (e.g., the Cabinet's composition) is not an issue, but the policy is". Eric Ciotti, centre-right-to-right-wing The Republicans (LR) party leader, declared that "an umpteenth reshuffle cannot be a serious response to the crisis we are facing", while Olivier Faure, centre-left Socialist Party (PS) First Secretary, branded the reshuffled Borne government as a "deliquescent" government.

=== Opinion polls ===
According to an Odoxa-Backbone consulting poll published by Le Figaro on 21 July, 61% of the French are dissatisfied with the reshuffle, 62% wanted to see a change of Prime minister and 74% think the reshuffled Cabinet will implement the same policy as before.

According to another poll conducted by the Elabe institute for news channel BFMTV on the 18 and 19 July (i.e., before the full extent of the reshuffle was known), 55% of the respondents thought Macron was "wrong" in keeping Borne as PM.

=== Questions about the reshuffle's handling ===
Some news media questioned the manner in which the whole July 2023 government reshuffle had been handled: 20 Minutes branded the political sequence as a "wacky week", a week during which the country learned that Macron had chosen to keep Borne as his Prime minister through unofficial reports and a more than discreet confirmation by the President's "entourage" given to the media. The multiple postponements of the new cabinet's announcement and the numerous leaks to the media about the government's new composition on announcement day while the official communiqué had not been sent out also contributed to give an unprecedented impression of chaos and uncertainty at the center of government.

Similarly, Le Monde reported that the manner in which Borne's retention of the premiership was announced had been widely considered as showing "little respect" to the Constitution, even inside Macron's own party.

=== Parliamentary support ===
One of the unofficial but most critical goals of this government reshuffle was to broaden parliamentary support for Macron's administration, which is in minority status in legislature as a result of the June 2022 parliamentary elections. Besides, no opposition party represented in Parliament showed interest in propping up a Macron-led administration or even discussing a potential coalition government. Therefore, the reshuffle became the only realistic opportunity for the executive branch to strengthen its political position in the face of the hung parliament elected a year ago.

In spite of that, Macron refused to shake up the ministerial line-up just like he refused to change his Prime minister. The consequence is that the reshuffle, in contrary to one of its purposes, did not change the parliamentary arithmetics, forcing Macron's administration to carry on governing on an ad-hoc, day-to-day basis, therefore risking deadlock and showdown with an opposition-dominated Parliament in the coming months.

=== Pap Ndiaye's dismissal ===
The head of the educational trade union (SGEN-CFDT), Catherine Nave-Bekhti, along with educational specialist Philippe Meirieu and former Socialist education minister Najat Vallaud-Belkacem, suggested that Pap Ndiaye lost his position as Education Minister in part due to his reply the week before to the constant criticism from CNews and Europe 1, in which he said that these two outlets, owned by conservative billionaire Vincent Bolloré, had become "radical far-right" news outlets.

Since his appointment to the Cabinet, Pap Ndiaye had become a target of right-wing and far-right opposition parties over his past as an African-American studies academic and his allegedly "woke" ideological inclinations.

== See also ==
- Borne government
- Presidency of Emmanuel Macron
