= July 2022 French government reshuffle =

French government reshuffle undertaken by Emmanuel Macron in 2022

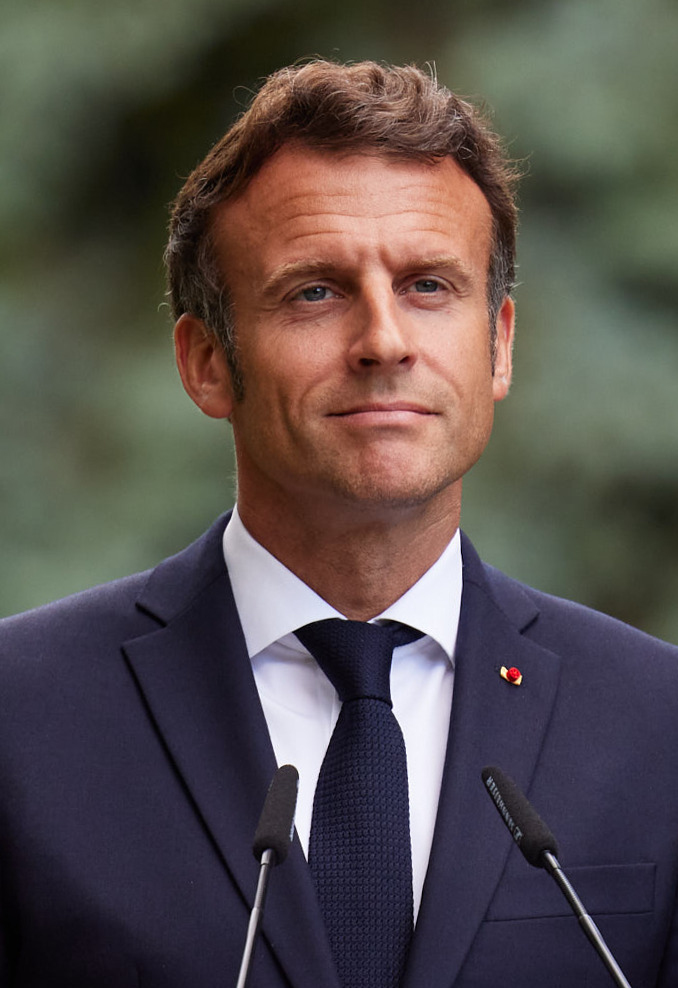
Emmanuel Macron

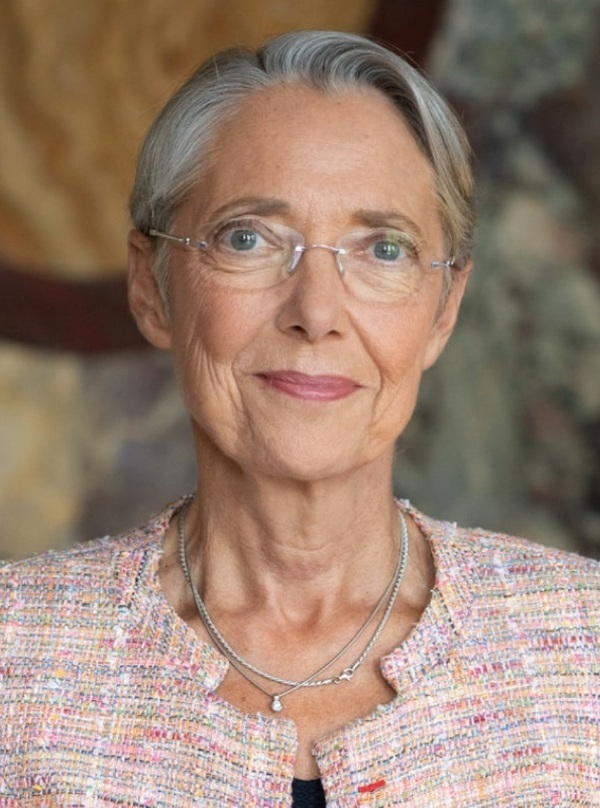
Élisabeth Borne

On 4 July 2022, Emmanuel Macron carried out the first reshuffle of his minority government, led by Prime minister Élisabeth Borne, since the start of his second presidential term. As it is customary that the Prime minister offers the resignation of their government after a legislative election under the Fifth Republic, a cabinet reshuffle was anticipated. However, the unexpected outcome of the June 2022 legislative election that saw President Macron's centrist coalition losing its majority in Parliament changed the dynamics and nature of the reshuffle: falling 38 seats short of an overall majority in the National Assembly (from a 115-seat majority in the previous Parliament) and with 3 ministers (including 2 senior ones) having lost their seats, the cabinet had to undergo broader changes than expected.

On 21 June 2022, two days after the second round of the legislative election, Prime minister Borne offered her government's resignation to the President but Macron refused it and instead asked the cabinet to "stay on task", a way to avoid a caretaking period that would have prevented ministers from taking important regulatory measures.

Between 21 June and 4 July, both President Macron and his Prime minister held talks with parliamentary opposition leaders in order to try forming a stable majority government. Nonetheless, since no opposition party showed interest in either supporting or entering a Macron-led government, the executive pair ultimately had to settle for a three-party minority coalition government. Also, adding to the political disarray surrounding the imminent reshuffle, Overseas Minister Yaël Braun-Pivet resigned from government on 25 June to run as the presidential bloc's candidate for President of the National Assembly, leaving her ministerial portfolio to the PM to manage.

Despite speculation about the scope of the reshuffle and reports of potential right-leaning appointments to the senior cabinet in a bid to bring the pivotal LR party closer to supporting the administration in Parliament, the reshuffle was less far-reaching than expected. Despite adding two dozen new ministers, few changes to the senior ministerial line-up were made and the new team's composition did not indicate any change of political direction as a result of the legislative election results. Brigitte Bourguignon, Health and Prevention Minister, and Amélie de Montchalin, Ecological Transition and Territorial Cohesion Minister, both resigned from cabinet after losing their seats in the election. Solidarity and Autonomy Minister Damien Abad, a former parliamentary LR leader, was sacked after rape allegations against him emerged and tarnished the presidential coalition's campaign. In the end, the reshuffle was considered to have been used more as an opportunity to calibrate political imbalances between diverse factions inside the cabinet than as a way to broaden its parliamentary appeal in the context of a hung parliament. Furthermore, multiple new junior-ministerial appointments were made and many figures with political experience during Macron's first term were promoted or even returned to government, as proven by Marlène Schiappa's appointment as State Secretary just a month after leaving the cabinet or Olivier Véran's appointment as the government spokesperson after being demoted in May. The new cabinet also included some new figures who were not career politicians, both in cabinet-level and in junior-ministerial jobs, as symbolized by the appointment of François Braun as Health and Prevention Minister.

Just after the reshuffle became effective, Véran, now acting as the government spokesperson, announced that the Prime Minister would not ask the National Assembly for a vote of confidence in her government and that the cabinet intended to govern on an ad hoc, bill-to-bill basis.

== Cabinet-level changes ==
Colour key
- Joined the Cabinet
- Left the Cabinet
- Portfolio renamed

Minister	Position before reshuffle	Result of reshuffle
Gérald Darmanin	Minister of the Interior	Became Minister of the Interior and Overseas
Amélie de Montchalin	Minister of Ecological Transition and Cohesion of Territories	Resigned from government after losing her parliamentary seat
Brigitte Bourguignon	Minister of Health and Prevention	Resigned from government after losing her parliamentary seat
Damien Abad	Minister for Solidarity, Autonomy and the Disabled	Sacked from government over rape accusations
Christophe Béchu	Deputy Minister for Territorial Collectivities	Promoted to become Minister of Ecological Transition and Cohesion of Territories
François Braun	Head of the ministerial flash fact-finding mission on emergency medical services and unscheduled care	Promoted to become Minister of Health and Prevention
Jean-Christophe Combe	Director General of the French Red Cross	Promoted to become Minister for Solidarity, Autonomy and the Disabled

== Junior ministerial changes ==
Colour key
- Promoted (Note: According to the ministerial order of precedence: Minister of State > Minister > Deputy Minister > State Secretary)
- Left the government

Minister	Position before reshuffle	Result of reshuffle
Olivier Véran	Deputy Minister for relations with Parliament and Democratic Life	Moved to become Government Spokesperson, Deputy Minister for Democratic Renewal (portfolio renamed)
Franck Riester	Deputy Minister for Attractiveness and International Trade	Moved to become Deputy Minister for Relations with Parliament
Clément Beaune	Deputy Minister for European Affairs	Moved to become Deputy Minister for Transports (office reestablished)
Justine Bénin	State Secretary for the Sea	Resigned from government after losing her parliamentary seat
Roland Lescure	Member of the National Assembly for the 1st constituency for French residents overseas	Promoted to become Deputy Minister for Industry (office established)
Jean-Noël Barrot	Member of the National Assembly for Yvelines's 2nd	Promoted to become Deputy Minister for Digital (office established)
Olivia Grégoire	State Secretary to the Prime minister, Government Spokesperson	Promoted to become Deputy Minister for Small and Medium Businesses, Trade, Crafts and Tourism (office established)
Caroline Cayeux	Mayor of Beauvais	Promoted to become Deputy Minister for Territorial Collectivities (office established)
Jean-François Carenco	President of the Energy Regulatory Commission	Promoted to become Deputy Minister for the Overseas
Olivier Becht	Member of the National Assembly for Haut-Rhin's 5th	Promoted to become Deputy Minister for International Trade, Attractiveness and French Nationals Abroad
Carole Grandjean	Member of the National Assembly for Meurthe-et-Moselle's 1st	Promoted to become State Secretary for Youth and National Universal Service
Olivier Klein	Mayor of Clichy-sous-Bois	Promoted to become Deputy Minister for Housing and Cities (office established)
Geneviève Darrieussecq	Member of the National Assembly for Landes's 1st	Promoted to become Deputy Minister for People with Disabilities (office established)
Marlène Schiappa	Former Deputy Minister for Citizenship	Promoted to become State Secretary for the Social and Solidarity Economy and Associative Life (office established)
Hervé Berville	Member of the National Assembly for Côtes-d'Armor's 2nd	Promoted to become State Secretary for the Sea
Sonia Backès	President of New Caledonia's South province Assembly	Promoted to become State Secretary for Citizenship (office reestablished)
Laurence Boone	Chief economist of the OECD	Promoted to become State Secretary for European Affairs (portfolio renamed)
Sarah El Haïry	Member of the National Assembly for Loire-Atlantique's 5th	Promoted to become State Secretary for Youth and National Universal Service (office reestablished)
Patricia Mirallès	Member of the National Assembly for Hérault's 1st	Promoted to become State Secretary for Veterans' Affairs and Memory (office reestablished)
Bérangère Couillard	Member of the National Assembly for Gironde's 7th	Promoted to become State Secretary for Ecology (office reestablished)
Dominique Faure	Member of the National Assembly for Haute-Garonne's 10th	Promoted to become State Secretary for Rural Affairs (office established)

== Reaction ==
=== Opinion polls ===
According to an Ifop-Fiducial poll for Sud Radio carried out on the 5 and 6 July 2022, 46% of the French said they were satisfied with the new government's composition, compared to 42% who were satisfied with the initial government's line-up in May 2022 and 48% who were satisfied with the Castex government's composition in July 2020.

== See also ==
- Borne government
- Presidency of Emmanuel Macron
