= 2023–2024 French government crisis =

Crisis ending Élisabeth Borne's premiership

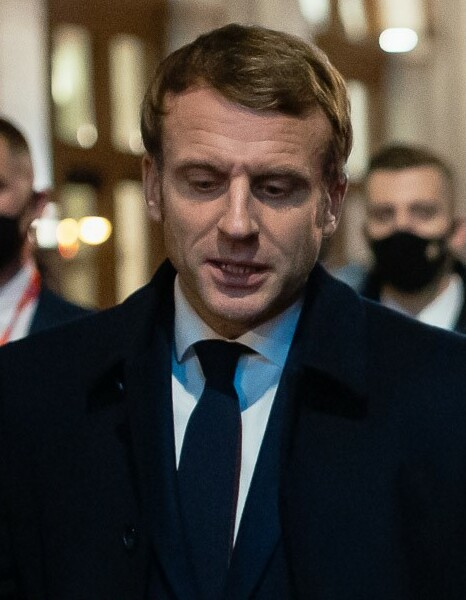
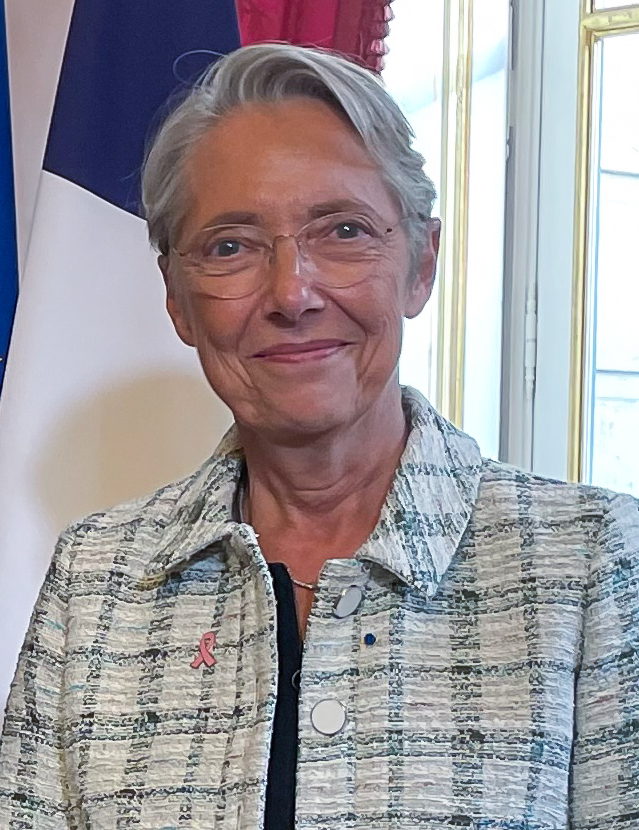
- Emmanuel Macron and Élisabeth Borne
- Date: 11 December 2023 – 9 January 2024 (4 weeks)
- Cause: Weakened government by the 2023 pension reform law and strikes; 2023 immigration and asylum bill; Poor polling figures ahead of the 2024 European Parliament election
- Motive: Pressure the government to ditch the immigration and asylum bill; Pressure President Macron to replace Borne as Prime Minister
- Participants: Ensemble coalition deputies and ministers
- Outcome: Government revolt; Passage of the immigration and asylum bill thanks to support from RN deputies; Resignation of Prime Minister Borne; Appointment of Gabriel Attal as Prime Minister and a new government

In December 2023, the Borne government, weakened by the unpopular 2023 pension reform law and strikes, and having narrowly survived by 9 votes a cross-party motion of no-confidence in the National Assembly on 20 March 2023, faced a governability and credibility crisis. It was caused mainly by the difficult passage of the 2023 immigration and asylum bill, one of President Emmanuel Macron's flagship manifesto commitments made during the 2022 presidential election campaign.

The immigration reform bill was a draft legislation introduced in Parliament on 1 February 2023 by Interior Minister Gérald Darmanin. It was received negatively by opposition parties, in particular by the conservative Republicans (LR) who both hold a majority in the Senate and the balance of power in the National Assembly. The bill, whose legislative process was stalled for many months, was unexpectedly defeated in the National Assembly on 11 December, ultimately leading to Darmanin offering his resignation to Macron and the government sending the bill to a joint parliamentary committee. The conservative-dominated joint committee agreed on a much tougher bill which earned the surprise endorsement of 2022 presidential runner-up and National Rally (RN) parliamentary leader Marine Le Pen, causing confusion and anger inside the Ensemble coalition's ranks.

Several ministers, in a major breach of collective ministerial responsibility, openly threatened to resign if the bill was passed, while scores of deputies from the three Ensemble parliamentary groups in the Assembly, including joint committee chair and prominent left-leaning figure inside Macron's camp Sacha Houlié, announced they would vote against the bill. After the bill was passed on 19 December, Health Minister Aurélien Rousseau resigned in protest. Higher Education Minister Sylvie Retailleau offered her resignation to protest measures affecting foreign students but remained in post after Macron gave her reassurances. Other ministers publicly voiced their opposition to the bill but did not act further on it.

In early January 2024, in spite of earlier public statements in which she expressed her intention to carry on as Prime Minister, Élisabeth Borne reluctantly resigned at Macron's request. Borne remained as caretaker until Education Minister Gabriel Attal, the most popular figure in the outgoing Borne government, was appointed on 9 January. He then formed a minority government from which he and Macron sacked the near-entirety of ministers who had rebelled in late December 2023.

== Background ==
In May 2022, as it is customary after a presidential election in France, Macron appointed a new Prime Minister: Élisabeth Borne became the second female head of government in French history. She then formed a new government, the fourth since the start of the Macron Presidency.

A month into its tenure, the Borne government lost its parliamentary majority in the June 2022 legislative election: the governing coalition remained the largest bloc in the National Assembly but now fell well short of an overall majority in the lower house. In spite of calls for Borne to resign as PM and the refusal from opposition parties to discuss a coalition agreement, Macron refused Borne's resignation offer and instead tasked her with forming a minority government. In early July, Borne survived the first motion of no confidence tabled against her government.

In August 2022, Interior and Overseas Minister Gérald Darmanin announced that the government would introduce an immigration bill in the autumn of that year after consulting with opposition parties. After consultations highlighted the lack of a majority for the bill's passage, the bill's introduction was again delayed to early 2023.

In early February 2023, the immigration & asylum bill was introduced in the Senate after it was approved by the Council of Ministers: a few weeks later, the bill's passage was halted after the government narrowly survived a no-confidence motion over its pension reform plan.

In the aftermath of the political crisis triggered by the pension reform, various polls pointed to a sharp decline in the executive pair's popularity while Le Pen's RN party extended its polling lead over Macron's coalition ahead of the upcoming 2024 European elections. By the time of the final vote on the immigration bill, the RN had opened a 12-point lead over the Macronist alliance, the widest gap since Macron was first elected in 2017.

== Parliament ==
After months of gridlock, the government finally introduced back the draft legislation in the Senate in November 2023: the conservative-controlled upper house substantially toughened the bill, with the Interior Minister's support on several occasions. The Senate passed the heavily amended bill in first reading on 14 November.

On 27 November 2023, the bill began its process in the National Assembly: the Macronist-led Law Committee thoroughly amended the Senate-approved draft, stamping out or lessening the majority of the upper house's changes. On 11 December 2023, the report stage in the National Assembly began with a vote on a preliminary dismissal motion tabled by Green MPs: the motion was unexpectedly passed in a 270–265 vote, meaning the bill was defeated without further consideration in the lower house.

The vote, marking the first time a sitting government was defeated on such motion in 15 years, effectively plunged the executive branch into crisis. Darmanin offered his resignation to Macron later in the evening, but Macron refused it. RN party leader Jordan Bardella called on the President to dissolve the National Assembly while left-wing opposition parties called on the government to ditch the draft legislation.

After the vote, the Prime Minister convened her cabinet for a crisis meeting to seek a way forward, ultimately leading to the decision to send the bill to a conservative-dominated joint parliamentary committee rather than ditching the bill or sending it back to the Senate.

Borne, now the de facto chief negotiator with The Republicans (LR) over the immigration legislation, met with LR leaders on multiple occasions both ahead of and during the joint committee stage: despite difficult talks and divisions inside the Macronist camp between left and right-leaning members, the negotiations led to a last-minute two-chapter agreement between the government and LR leadership.

In the first part of this informal deal, the government would agree to support major LR-endorsed changes to the bill, ditching many previous red lines and getting the final bill closer to the version passed by the Senate. In the second part of the deal, the Prime Minister solemnly promised that the government would overhaul the controversial "State Medical Assistance" (AME) system, a mechanism allowing illegal migrants to access Social Security-funded medical care on conditions, in a separate bill. The scope of the concessions made to the right created concern for a number of Macronist MPs and party grandees.

On 19 December, the joint committee agreed on a drastically hardened bill, with measures limiting foreigners' access to social benefits, reforming Jus soli, restricting family reunification procedures and the implementation of a "return deposit" for foreign students coming from outside the EU among other things.

Immediately after the finalized version of the bill was made public, parliamentary RN party leader Marine Le Pen hailed an "ideological victory" and announced that her MPs would support the legislation in the National Assembly. Le Pen's decision prompted panic and confusion inside Macron's ranks, with large swathes of centrist MPs, already set off-balance by the deal struck with the conservatives, now refusing to vote along Le Pen on immigration matters.

Additionally, prominent left-leaning ministers, such as Culture Minister Rima Abdul-Malak, Health Minister Aurélien Rousseau or Transports deputy minister Clément Beaune among others, reportedly met in the evening of the 19 December and threatened to resign if the bill was passed later that day.

After convening a crisis meeting at the Élysée Palace, President Macron, advised to do so by close ally and MoDem party leader François Bayrou, tried to reassure his troops by announcing that he would not sign the bill into law, instead sending it back later to Parliament, if the legislation was approved thanks to RN votes in the National Assembly.

In the evening of the 19 December 2023, both houses of Parliament passed the immigration & asylum bill, 214–114 in the Senate and then 349–186 in the National Assembly. In the lower house, 59 Macronist MPs (almost a quarter of the centrist coalition's MPs) defied the government either by abstaining (32) or voting against it (27), the largest parliamentary rebellion against a sitting government since the 1970s.

== Government turmoil ==
Immediately after the vote, Health Minister Aurélien Rousseau, appointed only 6 months earlier, resigned to protest against the bill's passage and the potential reform of the AME system while Higher Education Minister Sylvie Retailleau offered her resignation but she remained in the government after Macron and Borne gave her reassurances on the measures affecting foreign students in France.

In the days following the legislation's adoption, both Macron and his Prime minister publicly expressed doubts about the constitutionality of some of the bill's provisions despite having endorsed it through the parliamentary process, raising questions among politicians and legal scholars. Shortly after, Macron referred the bill to the Constitutional Council to appease concerns raised inside his coalition.

Other ministers, such as Abdul-Malak (Culture) and Beaune (Transports) continued to publicly voice their opposition to the immigration law, while remaining in government.

Furthermore, the governing coalition appeared to be left weaker and deeply divided by the passage of the bill, with MPs questioning their political affiliation and 2 MPs eventually quitting Macron's alliance in Parliament.

Additionally, freshly-appointed Health Minister Agnès Firmin-Le Bodo became embroiled in scandal over corruption allegations, raising doubts over her future in government.

== Resignation of Élisabeth Borne ==
In late 2023-early 2024, news media reported that a growing number of MPs and members from Macron's coalition wanted to see a change of Prime minister in the coming weeks, in an effort to relaunch the President's troubled second term and move on the contentious immigration debate. On 7 January 2024, MoDem party leader François Bayrou said that "changes" to the government's composition were "necessary" to "open a new period", implying a change of PM was crucial to revive Macron's presidency.

The crisis ended when Macron requested Élisabeth Borne to resign as PM, which she reluctantly did on 8 January 2024. The following day, she was succeeded by 34-year-old Education Minister Gabriel Attal, who was the most popular minister in the outgoing cabinet. He went on to form a minority government dominated by figures coming from the centre-right and from which Abdul-Malak and Beaune, leading figures of the government revolt over the immigration bill in late December 2023, were sacked.

== See also ==
- Borne government
- Attal government
