= Minister of Housing and Urban Renovation =

Cabinet member in the Government of France

- Ministre du Logement et de la Rénovation urbaine
- Incumbent; Vincent Jeanbrun since 12 October 2025
- Minister for Housing
- Member of: Cabinet
- Reports to: Prime Minister; Minister of Ecological Transition and Territorial Cohesion
- Seat: Hôtel de Castries
- Nominator: Prime Minister
- Appointer: President of the Republic
- Term length: No fixed term
- Formation: 17 April 1925
- Website: Official website

The Minister in charge of Housing (French: Ministre chargé du Logement) is a cabinet member in the Government of France. Since 12 October 2025, the position is held by Vincent Jeanbrun

== History ==
In 1925 the position was created and called High Commissioner for Housing, after World War II it became the Minister for Housing and Rebuilding. In 1967 it became attached to the Minister of Public Works in the government of Georges Pompidou then attached to the Minister of Territorial Development. From 2009 to 2012 the position was attached to the Minister of Ecology.

Previous titles have been: Ministre du Logement et de l'Égalité des territoires (Minister of Housing and Territorial Equality), Ministre de l'Emploi, de la Cohésion sociale et du Logement (Minister of Employment, Social Cohesion and Housing).

== List of Housing Ministers since 2007 ==
=== Presidency of Nicolas Sarkozy ===
- 18 May 2007 – 15 January 2009: Christine Boutin (Ministre du Logement et de la Ville)
- 15 January 2009 – 23 June 2009: Christine Boutin (Ministre du Logement)
- 23 June 2009 – 13 November 2010: Benoist Apparu (Secrétaire d'État chargé du Logement et de l'Urbanisme)
- 23 June 2009 – 22 February 2012: Benoist Apparu (Secrétaire d'État chargé du Logement)
- 22 February 2012 – 10 May 2012: Benoist Apparu (Ministre délégué au Logement)

=== Presidency of François Hollande ===
- 16 May 2012 – 2 April 2014: Cécile Duflot (Ministre de l'Égalité des territoires et du Logement)
- 2 April 2014 – 26 August 2014: Sylvia Pinel (Ministre du Logement et de l'Égalité des territoires)
- 26 August 2014 – 11 February 2016: Sylvia Pinel (Ministre du Logement, de l'Égalité des territoires et de la Ruralité)
- 6 December 2016 – 17 May 2017: Emmanuelle Cosse (Ministre du Logement et de l'Habitat durable)

=== Presidency of Emmanuel Macron ===
- 17 May 2017 – 21 June 2017: Richard Ferrand (Ministre de la Cohésion des territoires)
- 21 June 2017 – 16 October 2018: Jacques Mézard (Ministre de la Cohésion des territoires)
- 16 October 2018 – 6 July 2020: Julien Denormandie (Ministre chargé de la Ville et du Logement)
- 6 July 2020 – 20 May 2022: Emmanuelle Wargon (Ministre chargé du Logement)
- 20 May 2022 – 4 July 2022: Amélie de Montchalin (Ministre de la Transition écologique et de la Cohésion des territoires)
- 4 July 2022 – 20 July 2023: Olivier Klein (Ministre délégué chargé de la Ville et du Logement)
- 20 July 2023 – 11 January 2024: Patrice Vergriete (Ministre délégué chargé du Logement)
- 11 January 2024 – 8 February 2024: Christophe Béchu (Ministre de la Transition écologique et de la Cohésion des territoires)
- 8 February 2024 – 21 September 2024: Guillaume Kasbarian (Ministre délégué chargé du Logement)
- 21 September 2024 – 5 October 2025: Valérie Létard (Ministre du logement et de la rénovation urbaine)
- 5 October 2025 – 12 October 2025: Éric Woerth
- 12 October 2025 – present: Vincent Jeanbrun

== See also ==
- Public housing in France

== Sources ==
- "Archives de l'Assemblée nationale ~ Gouvernements et présidents des assemblées parlementaires depuis 1789". Archives (in French).
