= Patrice Vergriete =

French politician (born 1968)

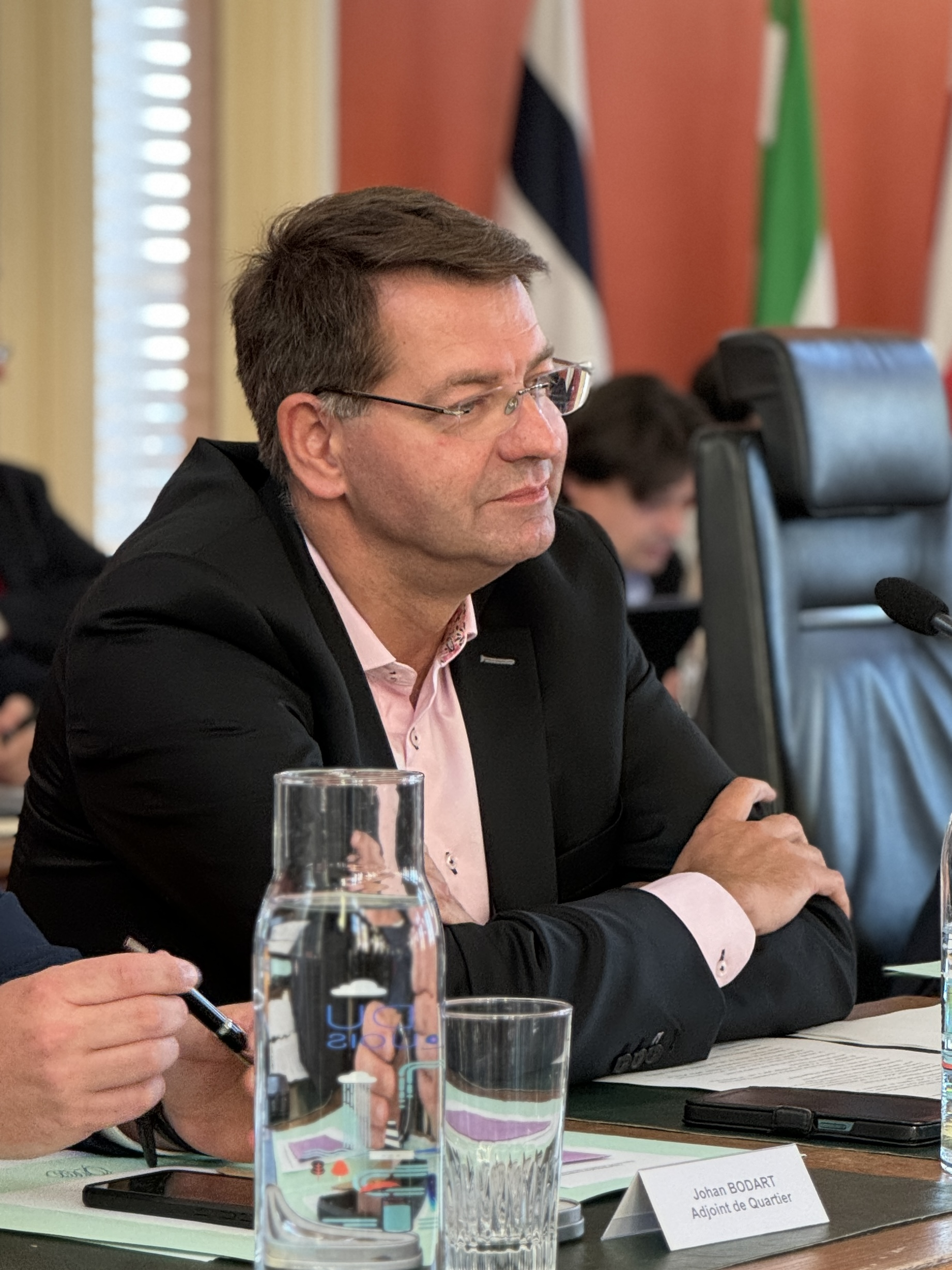
- Vergriete in 2023

Minister Delegate for Transport
- In office 8 February 2024 – 21 September 2024
- Prime Minister: Gabriel Attal
- Preceded by: Clément Beaune
- Succeeded by: François Durovray

Minister Delegate for Housing
- In office 20 July 2023 – 11 January 2024
- Prime Minister: Élisabeth Borne
- Preceded by: Olivier Klein
- Succeeded by: Guillaume Kasbarian

Mayor of Dunkirk
- Incumbent
- Assumed office 27 September 2024
- Preceded by: Jean Bodart
- In office 5 April 2014 – 29 September 2023
- Preceded by: Michel Delebarre
- Succeeded by: Jean Bodart

Personal details
- Born: 4 July 1968 (age 58) Dunkirk, France
- Party: Miscellaneous left
- Other political affiliations: Socialist Party (1993–2013)
- Education: École polytechnique

Patrice Vergriete ([patʁis vɛʁɡrit]; born 4 July 1968) is a French politician who has served as Mayor of Dunkirk since 2024, previously holding the office from 2014 to 2023. He served in government as Minister Delegate for Housing (2023–2024) and Minister Delegate for Transport (2024) under successive Prime Ministers Élisabeth Borne and Gabriel Attal.

== Biography ==
Born to a boilermaker father at Chantiers de France and a homemaker mother, Vergriete was raised in the bustling Glacis neighbourhood of Dunkirk.

Following his completion of the baccalaureate, he pursued further education in Paris by attending a scientific preparatory programme at the prestigious Lycée Louis-le-Grand. Succeeding in the École polytechnique entrance exam, he became a member of the class of 1989.

In 1995, he specialised at the École des ponts ParisTech, obtaining his diploma to become a bridges, waters and forests engineer.

At the end of the 1990s, he began his professional career at the OECD, then joined the cabinets of Minister of Employment and Solidarity Martine Aubry and Minister for the City Claude Bartolone.

== Political career ==
In 2014, Vergriete was elected Mayor of Dunkirk. On 1 September 2018, the implementation of free bus services was initiated, making the urban community of Dunkirk the largest urban area in Europe to offer unrestricted access to its entire bus network.

In December 2019, Vergriete declared his intention to run for a second term as mayor. He secured reelection in 2020 in the first round of voting with 64% of the total votes.

On 24 January 2023, he was appointed chair of the Agence de financement des infrastructures de transport de France (AFIT France) based on the recommendation from the Élysée.

In the July 2023 government reshuffle, Vergriete was appointed Minister Delegate for Housing in the government of Prime Minister Élisabeth Borne. On 29 September 2023, following his appointment to the government, he stepped down from his position as Mayor of Dunkirk and assumed the role of first deputy mayor.

From February to September 2024, Vergriete held the position of Minister Delegate for Transport in the government led by Gabriel Attal. As Transport Minister, he faced a series of railway arson attacks on 26 July 2024, the day of the 2024 Summer Olympics opening ceremony in Paris.
