= Princesa de África =

- Directed by: Juan Laguna
- Screenplay by: Juan Laguna
- Produced by: Producciones Bereberia
- Starring: Sonia Sampayo; Pap Ndiaye; Marem Ndiaye
- Cinematography: Borja Pozueco; Gabriel Molera
- Edited by: Juan Laguna
- Music by: Manuel Sanz; Juan Laguna
- Release date: 2008
- Running time: 76 minutes
- Country: Spain

Princesa de África is a 2008 documentary film.

== Synopsis ==
The story of two dreams. Marem, a 14-year-old dancer from Senegal, dreams of emigrating to Europe, while Sonia, a Spanish dancer, feels drawn by the magic of Africa. Both are linked by Pap Ndiaye, Marem's father and Sonia's husband. Africa isn't what Sonia had dreamt of (Pap Ndiaye has two additional wives), nor is Europe what Marem expected (there are no children in the street and poverty is also present). Princess of Africa is a love story, full of music and dance, where nothing is what it seems and women are the main characters.

== Awards ==
- Festival de Cine Europeo “Vinos de Castilla-La Mancha” de Solana 2008
- Extremadocs 2008
- Festival Alcances 2008
