= 2022 vote of confidence in the government of Élisabeth Borne =

Since two votes of no confidence were held against the government of Élisabeth Borne during 2022, the term 2022 vote of confidence in the government of Élisabeth Borne may refer to:

- July 2022 vote of no confidence in the government of Élisabeth Borne
- October 2022 votes of no confidence in the government of Élisabeth Borne
