= Nuclear option (disambiguation) =

The nuclear option is a political tactic used in the United States Senate.

Nuclear option may also refer to:

- Nuclear warfare
- Nuclear weapon
  - Strategic nuclear weapon
  - Tactical nuclear weapon
- A hyperbole by analogy to nuclear weapons, referring to the most extreme amongst a range of options
- Article 7 of the Treaty on European Union, a political tactic, is sometimes called the nuclear option

== See also ==
- Nuclear strategy
- Nuclear power
- Mutual assured destruction
- Intercontinental ballistic missile
- Nuclear triad
- Filibuster in the United States Senate
- Standing Rules of the United States Senate, Rule XXII
- Cloture#United States
- Article 49 of the French Constitution, Clause 3
- Nuclear Option, a 2022 Combat flight simulator developed by Shockfront Studios
