= Rima Abdul Malak =

French politician (born 1979)

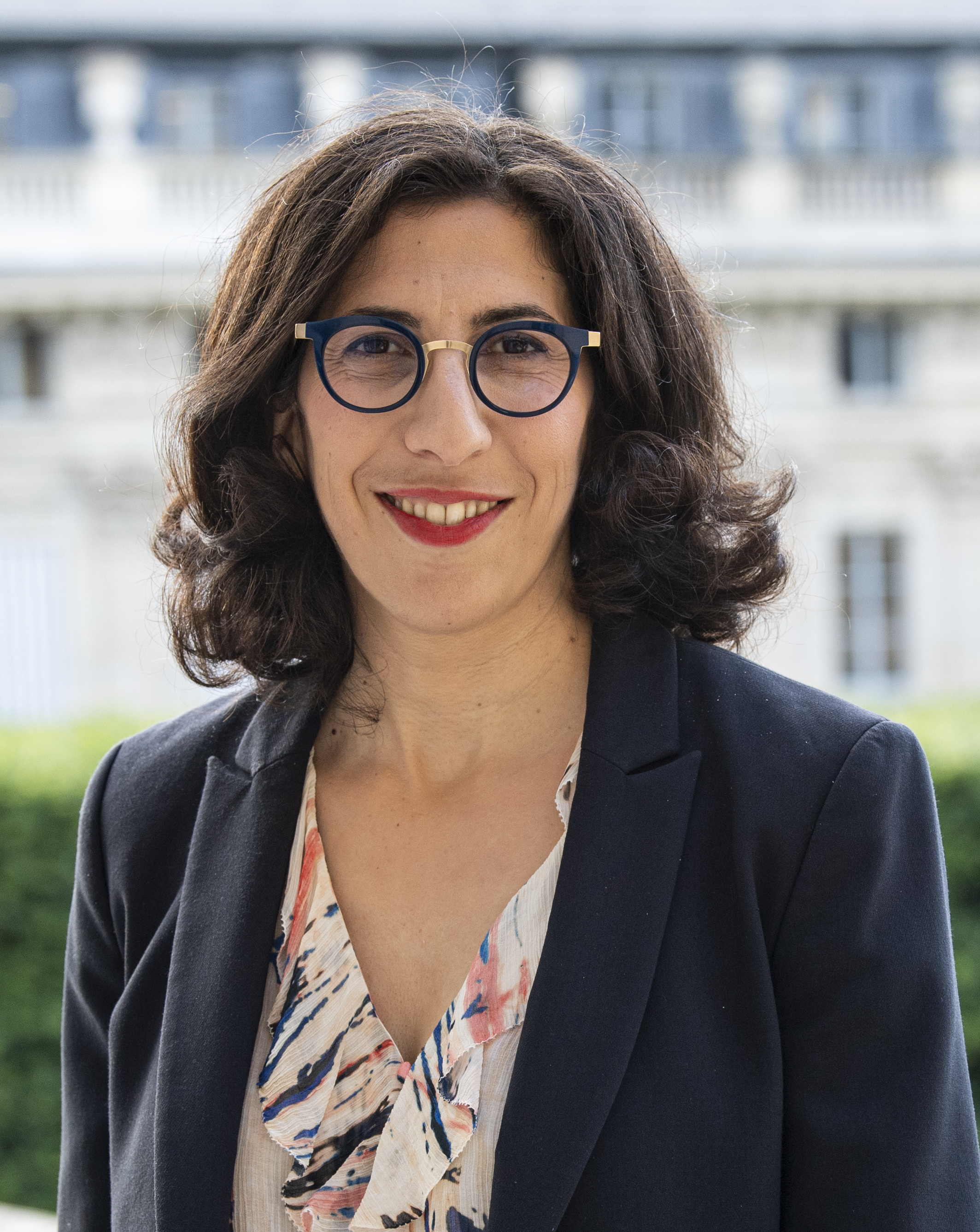
- Abdul Malak in 2022

Minister of Culture
- In office 20 May 2022 – 11 January 2024
- Prime Minister: Élisabeth Borne
- Preceded by: Roselyne Bachelot
- Succeeded by: Rachida Dati

Personal details
- Born: 11 February 1979 (age 47) Beirut, Lebanon
- Citizenship: France; Lebanon
- Education: Sciences Po Lyon, Paris 1 Panthéon-Sorbonne University

Rima Abdul Malak (Arabic: ريما عبد الملك; born 11 February 1979) is a French politician who served as Minister of Culture in the government of Prime Minister Élisabeth Borne from May 2022 to January 2024. She is executive director of the Francophone Lebanese newspaper L'Orient–Le Jour.

== Early life ==
Abdul Malak was born into a Lebanese family on 11 February 1979 in Beirut. When she was 10 years old, her family left the country during the Lebanese Civil War. She has dual French and Lebanese citizenship.

Malak studied at the Lycee International de Lyon, then at the Institute of Political Studies in Lyon, where she had libertarian political scientist Phillipe Corcuff as her teacher. Malak graduated from the school in 1999. In 2000, she obtained a DESS in Development and International Cooperation at the Pantheon-Sorbonne University in Paris.

== Early career ==
From 2001 to 2006, Abdul Malak directed programs of the association Clowns sans frontieres, whose mission is to provide psychosocial support to children and populations who are victims of humanitarian crises or are in situations of major precariousness. She participated in the Clowns sans frontieres book J'ai 10 ans (I am ten years old), published in 2003, and in the organization of support shows, in particular at the Olympia, with the sponsor artists of the association, such as Matthieu Chedid. In December 2013, she participated in Michael Drucker's Vivement dimanche program at the invitation of Louis and Matthieu Chedid to promote the association.

In 2008, Abdul Malak became a live performance advisor to the Deputy of Culture for Christophe Girard, then his director of cabinet in 2010. She worked on the reform of multiple theaters and the renewal of their management, the opening of new cultural facilities such as the Centquatre, the Gaite-Lyrique, the houses of amateur artistic practices, and organized the Estates General of the Night, following the position "When the night dies in silence".

From 2012 to 2014, Abdul Malak worked as advisor on cultural affairs to Mayor of Paris Bertrand Delanoë. She participated in several municipal projects such as the Philharmonie, the creation of public establishment Paris Musees bringing together the fourteen of the seventeen museums of Paris, the opening of the Louxor - Palais du Cinema, the development of libraries, and the Nuit Blanche.

From 2014 to 2018, Abdul Malak served as cultural attaché at the Consulate General of France, New York City. She promoted the diffusion of the "French scene" by allowing French artists to perform in the United States by encouraging translations and new creations. She set up a festival for young audiences called TILT, co-organized with the FIAF and around ten partner venues by programming artists from the French-speaking world and American artists. She also participated in the programming of the Nights of Philosophy and festivals of Albertine Books. She was also responsible for support funds of the FACE Foundation (French American Cultural Heritage) for contemporary art, theater, dance, contemporary music, and jazz.

From 2019 to 2022, Abdul Malak served as advisor on cultural affairs and communications to President Emmanuel Macron, replacing Claudia Ferrazzi. She orchestrated the implementation of the white year for intermittents du spectacle following the crisis caused by the COVID-19 pandemic. In 2020 she was mentioned as a possible Minister of Culture, succeeding Franck Riester.

== Political career ==
Abdul Malak was appointed to the French government as a Minister of Culture in the Élisabeth Borne government in May 2022. She appointed Emmanuel Marcovitch as chief of staff.

During her time in office, Abdul Malak sought to defend "cultural sovereignty, to invest in artistic education and to take up the challenge of the ecological transition in the artistic milieu". She collaborated with the Minister of National Education, Pap Ndiaye, with a view to appeasement of memories; she referred to the words of Emmanuel Macron. saying "It is neither a policy of repentance nor a policy of denial, it is a policy of recognition".

== Controversies ==
A month after her appointment as Minister of Culture, Abdul Malak gave an interview to the newspaper Le Parisien where she announced her political projects. She said that she wanted to keep Dominique Boutonnat as the head of the National Center for Cinema and the Moving Image, although he had been indicted for sexual assault. She justified this decision by "the presumption of innocence" and also underlined his record; "He is the boss of a CNC which has faced the crisis and which, moreover, has been a pioneer in the fight against sexual violence and sexism."

During the closing ceremony of the 2023 Cannes Film Festival, Abdul Malak said she was "stunned" by the words of filmmaker Justine Triet during her speech as winner of the Palme d'Or. Triet sparked a controversy. The next day Abdul Malak denounced a "far-left ideological background" of "ungrateful and unjust" discourse. The minister was later accused of blocking Triet's film from being France's nomination to the Academy Awards. Instead, The Taste of Things was nominated.
