= Borne government =

Government of France (2022-2024)

- 43rd Government of French Fifth Republic
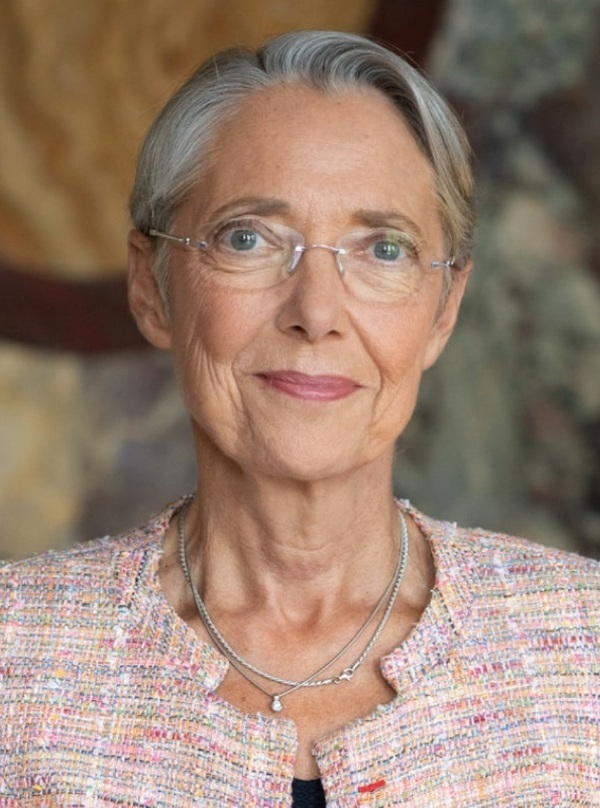
- Official portrait of Borne, 2022
- Date formed: 16 May 2022
- Date dissolved: 9 January 2024

People and organisations
- President of the Republic: Emmanuel Macron
- Prime Minister: Élisabeth Borne
- No. of ministers: 39 (Note: Does not include the Prime Minister.)
- Ministers removed: 14 resignations and dismissals
- Member parties: RE; MoDem; HOR
- Status in legislature: Majority (May–June 2022); Minority (June 2022–January 2024); Caretaker (January 2024)
- Opposition parties: RN; NUPES; LR

History
- Election: 2022 French legislative election
- Legislature terms: 2017–2022; 2022–2024
- Predecessor: Castex government
- Successor: Attal government

The Borne government (French: gouvernement Borne) was the forty-third government of the French Fifth Republic, formed on 16 May 2022 and headed by Élisabeth Borne as Prime Minister under President Emmanuel Macron. It served as a caretaker government in early January 2024, before Gabriel Attal was appointed prime minister by Macron.

Despite its minority status as a result of the June 2022 legislative election, the Borne government had survived multiple votes of no confidence in the National Assembly: one in July 2022 after Macron's refusal to accept the government's resignation, three in October 2022 in response to the use of constitutional article 49.3 by the government to pass a social security bill, and two in March 2023, again in response of the use of article 49.3 to pass a pension reform bill. All of them were thanks to the abstentions of MPs from The Republicans.

The Borne government was reshuffled twice, first in July 2022, second in July 2023.

It was the first French government not to formally resign after a legislative election since Georges Clemenceau's second ministry in 1919.

Amid a major political crisis, the government was dissolved following Borne's resignation in January 2024 and was succeeded by the Attal government.

== History ==
=== Formation ===
On 16 May 2022, more than three weeks after the presidential election and 9 days after the second inauguration of Emmanuel Macron, Jean Castex tendered the resignation of his government to the President of the Republic. The same day, the Élysée Palace informed the press that Élisabeth Borne, incumbent Minister of Labour, Employment and Economic Inclusion, would replace him and form a new government, the fourth since the election of Macron.

Elisabeth Borne became the second female Prime minister of France, after Edith Cresson between 1991 and 1992.

=== June 2022 legislative election ===
Just about a month into its tenure, the Borne government fought the 2022 French legislative elections on the 12 and 19 June. Throughout the campaign, the government faced several political controversies such as rape accusations against newly appointed Minister for Solidarity Damien Abad and the 2022 UEFA Champions League final chaos and its handling that drew widespread criticism at home and abroad.

In the first round, Macron's Ensemble coalition finished 1st, but almost tied with the left-wing NUPES coalition in the popular vote (25.8% vs. 25.7%). The National Rally (RN) came in third, with 18.7% of the votes. When compared with the 2017 legislative election's results, it represented a sharp decline from the 32.3% of votes Macron's coalition had attracted 5 years earlier. Nonetheless, the governing coalition was projected to retain its absolute majority, though by a razor-thin margin, in the second round by most pollsters.

In the second round, the Borne government unexpectedly lost its parliamentary majority and the legislative election resulted in a hung parliament for the first time since 1988. The government, which enjoyed a 115-seat majority before the election, now fell 38 seats short of an overall majority, making it the weakest government in the history of the Fifth Republic. Additionally, two senior ministers and one junior minister lost their seats in the parliamentary elections and therefore had to resign: Brigitte Bourguignon (Health), Amélie de Montchalin (Ecological Transition) and Justine Bénin (Secretary of State for the Sea).

Borne, speaking from the Hôtel Matignon, told the French: "Tonight the situation is unprecedented. Never has the National Assembly known such a configuration under the Fifth Republic. This situation poses a risk for our country given the challenges we have to face both at home and abroad".

=== July 2022 reshuffle ===
Following the failure to secure a majority in the June elections but also as a republican custom after parliamentary elections, Elisabeth Borne offered her resignation to President Macron on the 21 June, but he refused it and asked her government to remain in office. Thus, Macron broke with an old unwritten rule under which, after parliamentary elections, the Prime Minister formally resigns and is re-appointed by the President, with the task of forming a new government.

On the 21 and 22 June, Macron held talks with the leaders of parties represented in Parliament in an effort to secure a working majority either by forming a coalition government with an opposition party or by forming a national unity government. The talks failed to produce any tangible result. On 22 June, Macron addressed the nation, acknowledging there was no majority in the new Assembly and calling on the "spirit of responsibility" of all political parties.

At the end of the month, Borne in turn held talks with parliamentary leaders from the opposition in order to find common ground and break the political deadlock in sight. The talks again failed.

On 4 July, Borne officially formed a minority government and Macron reshuffled the government on her proposal: senior ministers personally defeated in June were replaced and several new junior ministers were appointed, but in general manner, there was no significant change from the government appointed in May. The same day, the Government's Spokesperson, Olivier Véran, announced that the government would not seek a vote of confidence in the lower house as it is customary (but not obligatory). This led to NUPES presenting a motion of no confidence. According to MP Bastien Lachaud, the no-confidence motion was meant to "clarify things. It concerns the method of refusing to ask for confidence. Any member of Parliament who is aware today that this is a denial of democracy can vote for this motion".

=== 16th legislature ===
The motion of no confidence by NUPES was defeated by a large majority on 5 July, as MPs from the right-wing opposition parties refused to associate themselves with a left-wing proposal.

Motion of no confidence NUPES
Ballot →	11 July 2022
Required majority →	289 out of 577
Yes votes	146 / 577
Abstentions or absentees (de facto against the motion since only votes in favour are counted)	431 / 577

The government faced again new no-confidence motions from the NUPES and the National Rally. National Rally leader Marine Le Pen surprisingly announced at the last minute that her party would vote in favour of any motion of no confidence tabled by the other parliamentary groups ″in acceptable terms″. Despite the votes of the National Rally in favour of a motion tabled by the NUPES coalition, it remained 50 votes short of a majority, due to the refusal of the right-wing Republicans (LR) to support it. The LR group justified its refusal to vote the motion of no confidence ″out of responsibility″ in order to avoid ″chaos″. The motions were thus rejected.

Motion of no confidence NUPES
Ballot →	24 October 2022
Required majority →	289 out of 577
Yes votes	239 / 577
Abstentions or absentees (de facto against the motion since only votes in favour are counted)	338 / 577

Motion of no confidence RN
Ballot →	24 October 2022
Required majority →	289 out of 577
Yes votes	90 / 577
Abstentions or absentees (de facto against the motion since only votes in favour are counted)	487 / 577

Motion of no confidence concerning the first part of the Social Security Finance Bill; NUPES
Ballot →	24 October 2022
Required majority →	289 out of 577
Yes votes	150 / 577
Abstentions or absentees (de facto against the motion since only votes in favour are counted)	427 / 577

On 20 March 2023, the Borne government narrowly survived a cross-party motion of no-confidence, clinging onto office by only 9 votes (278 votes against the government, therefore failing to reach the 287-threshold required to bring it down), over the use of constitutional article 49.3 to push through the 2023 pension reform bill in the National Assembly. The motion had been introduced by the centrist LIOT and supported by NUPES, the National Rally and a minority of Republicans. A further motion of no confidence presented by the National Rally on the same day also failed.

Motion of no confidence LIOT and NUPES
Ballot →	20 March 2023
Required majority →	287 out of 573
Votes in favour: • RN (88); • LFI (74); • SOC (31); • ECO (22); • GDR (22); • LR (19); • LIOT (18); • NI (4)	278 / 573
Abstentions or absentees (de facto against the motion since only votes in favour are counted)	295 / 573

Motion of no confidence RN
Ballot →	20 March 2023
Required majority →	287 out of 573
Votes in favour: • RN (88); • LR (3); • NI (2); • SOC (1)	94 / 573
Abstentions and absentees (Note: Under the French Constitution of 1958, motions of no confidence are voted on by open ballot, with only those in favor of the motion taking part in the vote. Since a majority of the entire membership is required, those who are absent or do not cast a ballot are de facto voting against.)	479 / 573

On 12 June 2023, the Borne government survived its 17th motion of no-confidence since the beginning of the 16th legislature: the motion, brought forward by the left-wing NUPES coalition in response to the use of constitutional article 40 to block an opposition-sponsored amendment reintroducing the 62-year retirement age on the centrist LIOT group's opposition day, was defeated with only 239 votes, 50 votes short of the 289-threshold required to overthrow the government.

Motion of no confidence NUPES
Ballot →	12 June 2023
Required majority →	289 out of 577
Yes votes	239 / 573
Abstentions or absentees (de facto against the motion since only votes in favour are counted)	338 / 577

=== July 2023 reshuffle ===
In April 2023, speaking in the immediate aftermath of the contentious debates over his pension system reform, President Macron asked his government for a "hundred days of appeasement and action", citing ecology, work, social progress, justice and republican order as top priorities for the next months and told the Nation that he would assess the progress made at the end of the political period. Additionally, Macron again invited Prime Minister Borne to broaden her parliamentary support by forging "new coalitions and alliances" since her government found itself 38 shy of an overall majority in Parliament as a result of the June 2022 legislative election.

Over the 100-day period, the Borne government oversaw little legislative progress on the issues deemed as top priorities by Macron: following the difficult passage of the pension system reform, the government entered discussions with trade unions on a future Bill regarding life at work, a full employment Bill was passed by the Senate in first reading early July, the introduction of the immigration and asylum Bill was postponed amid fears of defeat in Parliament and diverse announcements related to the youth and the education system were made. Regarding the minority status of her government in legislature, Borne again failed to form a stable majority government and had to carry on her approach of working with moderate opposition parties to advance legislation, on a case-by-case basis, through Parliament.

Even though protests and street violence related to the pension reform calmed down throughout the weeks, which was deemed a success for Macron and his administration, France saw several days of race riots and widespread unrest in early summer following the killing of the 17-year-old Nahel M. during a traffic stop by the police.

Despite rumors about a potential change of prime minister, on 17 July 2023, the Élysée Palace confirmed reports that Macron had asked Borne to remain in office and invited her to make proposals for a government reshuffle.

On 20 July, the new composition of the government was announced: 8 new ministers were appointed, 3 senior ministers (Education, Health and Solidarity) and 5 junior ministers. Additionally, State Secretary to the Prime Minister Marlène Schiappa, a prominent figure of the Macron presidency since 2017, was sacked.

== Initial composition ==
On 20 May 2022, the composition of the government (excluding the Prime Minister) was announced by Alexis Kohler from the steps of the Élysée Palace. The members of the previous government remained in office to deal with current and urgent matters until the appointment of the new government, as provided for in the French Constitution.

=== Ministers ===
Portfolio	Name	Party
Prime Minister	Élisabeth Borne	LREM-TDP
Minister of Economy, Finances and Industrial & Digital Sovereignty	Bruno Le Maire	LREM
Minister of the Interior	Gérald Darmanin	LREM
Minister for Europe and Foreign Affairs	Catherine Colonna	SE
Minister of Justice / Keeper of the Seals	Éric Dupond-Moretti	SE
Minister for Ecological Transition and Territorial Cohesion	Amélie de Montchalin	LREM
Minister of National Education and Youth	Pap Ndiaye	SE
Minister of the Armed Forces	Sébastien Lecornu	LREM
Minister of Health	Brigitte Bourguignon	LREM-TDP
Minister of Labour, Employment and Integration	Olivier Dussopt	TDP
Minister for Solidarity, Autonomy and the Disabled	Damien Abad	SE
Minister of Higher Education	Sylvie Retailleau	SE
Minister for Agriculture and Food Sovereignty	Marc Fesneau	MoDem
Minister for Transformation and Civil Service	Stanislas Guerini	LREM
Minister for Overseas France	Yaël Braun-Pivet	LREM
Minister for Culture	Rima Abdul Malak	SE
Minister for Energy Transition	Agnès Pannier-Runacher	LREM-TDP
Minister for Sport and the Olympic & Paralympic Games	Amélie Oudéa-Castéra	LREM

Deputy Ministers

Portfolio	Attached minister	Name	Party
Minister for Relations with Parliament and Citizen Participation	Prime Minister	Olivier Véran	LREM-TDP
Minister for Gender Equality, Diversity and Equal Opportunities	Prime Minister	Isabelle Lonvis-Rome	SE
Minister for Public Accounts	Minister of Economy, Finances and Industrial & Digital Sovereignty	Gabriel Attal	LREM
Minister of Territorial Collectivities	Minister of the Interior; Minister for Ecological Transition and Territorial Cohesion	Christophe Béchu	HOR
Minister for Foreign Trade and Attractiveness	Minister of Europe and Foreign Affairs	Franck Riester	Agir
Minister for European Affairs	Minister of Europe and Foreign Affairs	Clément Beaune	LREM-TDP

State Secretaries

Portfolio	Attached minister	Name	Party
Government Spokesperson	Prime Minister	Olivia Grégoire	LREM
State Secretary for the Sea	Prime Minister	Justine Benin	SE
State Secretary for Children	Prime Minister	Charlotte Caubel	SE
State Secretary for Development, the Francophonie, and International Partnerships	Minister of Europe and Foreign Affairs	Chrysoula Zacharopoulou	LREM

== Change of the composition of the government in June 2022 ==
In June 2022 Yaël Braun-Pivet resigned to be a candidate for the presidency of the National Assembly. She was replaced, as interim, by Elisabeth Borne.

== Change of the composition of the government in July 2022 ==
Following the French legislative elections, a change in the composition of the government was announced on 4 July 2022.

The reshuffle of the Borne government comes following the 2022 legislative elections. Emmanuel Macron's party La République En Marche! with the Ensemble coalition did not obtain an absolute majority in the National Assembly but only a relative majority. This therefore forced Prime Minister Elisabeth Borne to review her government to be more in line with the new legislature. In particular, the president and then the prime minister met with the party leaders and then the leaders of the parliamentary groups in order to find if the idea of a coalition government can be implemented.

=== Ministers ===
Portfolio	Name	Party
Prime Minister	Élisabeth Borne	RE
Minister of Economy, Finances and Industrial & Digital Sovereignty	Bruno Le Maire	RE
Minister of the Interior and Overseas	Gérald Darmanin	RE
Minister for Europe and Foreign Affairs	Catherine Colonna	SE
Minister of Justice / Keeper of the Seals	Éric Dupond-Moretti	SE
Minister for Ecological Transition and Territorial Cohesion	Christophe Béchu	HOR
Minister of National Education and Youth	Pap Ndiaye	SE
Minister of the Armed Forces	Sébastien Lecornu	RE
Minister of Health and Prevention	François Braun	SE
Minister of Labour, Employment and Integration	Olivier Dussopt	RE
Minister for Solidarity, Autonomy and the Disabled	Jean-Christophe Combe	SE
Minister of Higher Education and Research	Sylvie Retailleau	SE
Minister for Agriculture and Food Sovereignty	Marc Fesneau	MoDem
Minister for Transformation and Civil Service	Stanislas Guerini	RE
Minister for Culture	Rima Abdul Malak	SE
Minister for Energy Transition	Agnès Pannier-Runacher	RE
Minister for Sport and the Olympic & Paralympic Games	Amélie Oudéa-Castéra	RE

Deputy Ministers

Portfolio	Attached minister	Name	Party
Minister for Democratic Renewal, Government Spokesman	Prime Minister	Olivier Véran	RE
Minister for Relations with Parliament	Prime Minister	Franck Riester	RE
Minister for Gender Equality, Diversity and Equal Opportunities	Prime Minister	Isabelle Lonvis-Rome	SE
Minister for Public Accounts	Minister of Economy, Finances and Industrial & Digital Sovereignty	Gabriel Attal	RE
Minister for Industry	Minister of Economy, Finances and Industrial & Digital Sovereignty	Roland Lescure	RE
Minister for Digital Transition and Telecommunications	Minister of Economy, Finances and Industrial & Digital Sovereignty	Jean-Noël Barrot	MoDem
Minister for Small and Medium Enterprises, Trade, Crafts and Tourism	Minister of Economy, Finances and Industrial & Digital Sovereignty	Olivia Grégoire	RE
Minister of Territorial Collectivities	Minister of the Interior and Overseas; Minister for Ecological Transition and Territorial Cohesion	Caroline Cayeux	SE
Minister of Overseas	Minister of the Interior and Overseas	Jean-François Carenco	RE
Minister for Foreign Trade, Attractiveness and French Nationals Abroad	Minister for Europe and Foreign Affairs	Olivier Becht	RE
Minister for Education and Vocational Training	Minister of Labour, Employment and Integration; Minister of National Education and Youth	Carole Grandjean	RE
Minister of Transport	Minister for Ecological Transition and Territorial Cohesion	Clément Beaune	RE
Minister for Cities and Housing	Minister for Ecological Transition and Territorial Cohesion	Olivier Klein	FP
Minister for Territorial Organization and Health Professions	Minister of Health and Prevention	Agnès Firmin-Le Bodo	HOR
Minister for People with Disabilities	Minister for Solidarity, Autonomy and the Disabled	Geneviève Darrieussecq	MoDem

State Secretaries

Portfolio	Attached minister	Name	Party
State Secretary for the Social and Solidarity Economy and Associative Life	Prime Minister	Marlène Schiappa	RE
State Secretary for the Sea	Prime Minister	Hervé Berville	RE
State Secretary for Children	Prime Minister	Charlotte Caubel	SE
State Secretary for Citizenship	Minister of the Interior and Overseas	Sonia Backès	LRC
State Secretary for European Affairs	Minister of Europe and Foreign Affairs	Laurence Boone	SE
State Secretary for Development, the Francophonie, and International Partnerships	Minister of Europe and Foreign Affairs	Chrysoula Zacharopoulou	RE
State Secretary for Youth and National Universal Service	Minister of the Armed Forces; Minister of National Education and Youth	Sarah El Haïry	MoDem
State Secretary for Veterans and Remembrance	Minister of the Armed Forces	Patricia Mirallès	RE
State Secretary for Ecology	Minister for Ecological Transition and Territorial Cohesion	Bérangère Couillard	RE
State Secretary for Rural Affairs	Minister for Ecological Transition and Territorial Cohesion	Dominique Faure	PR

== Change of the composition of the government in July 2023 ==
In April 2023, speaking in the immediate aftermath of the contentious debates over his pension system reform, President Macron asked his government for a "hundred days of appeasement and action", citing ecology, work, social progress, justice and republican order as top priorities for the next months and told the Nation that he would assess the progress made at the end of the political period. Additionally, Macron again invited Prime Minister Borne to broaden her parliamentary support by forging "new coalitions and alliances" since her government found itself 38 shy of an overall majority in Parliament as a result of the June 2022 legislative election.

Despite rumors about a potential change of prime minister at the end of the 100-day period, on 17 July 2023, the Élysée Palace confirmed reports that Macron had asked Borne to remain in office and invited her to make proposals for a government reshuffle.

On 20 July 2023, a change in the composition of the government was announced.

== Change of the composition of the government in September 2023/October 2023 ==
In September 2023, State Secretary for Citizenship Sonia Backès resigned after being defeated in the 2023 Senate election. She was replaced on 10 October 2023 by Sabrina Agresti-Roubache, who gained the Citizenship portfolio in addition to Cities Portfolio.

== Change of the composition of the government in December 2023 ==
In December 2023, Health Minister Aurélien Rousseau resigned from the government over his opposition to the "controversial" immigration bill passed by the French Parliament and backed by the government. Hours later, Agnès Firmin-Le Bodo was appointed as Minister of Health and Prevention.

== Composition at resignation ==
=== Ministers ===
Portfolio	Name	Party
Prime Minister	Élisabeth Borne	RE
Minister of Economy, Finances and Industrial & Digital Sovereignty	Bruno Le Maire	RE
Minister of the Interior and Overseas	Gérald Darmanin	RE
Minister for Europe and Foreign Affairs	Catherine Colonna	SE
Minister of Justice / Keeper of the Seals	Éric Dupond-Moretti	SE
Minister of the Armed Forces	Sébastien Lecornu	RE
Minister of Labour, Full Employment and Inclusion	Olivier Dussopt	RE
Minister of National Education and Youth	Gabriel Attal	RE
Minister of Higher Education and Research	Sylvie Retailleau	SE
Minister for Agriculture and Food Sovereignty	Marc Fesneau	MoDem
Minister for Ecological Transition and Territorial Cohesion	Christophe Béchu	HOR
Minister for Energy Transition	Agnès Pannier-Runacher	RE
Minister for Culture	Rima Abdul Malak	SE
Minister of Health and Prevention	Agnès Firmin-Le Bodo	HOR
Minister for Solidarity and Family	Aurore Bergé	RE
Minister for Transformation and Civil Service	Stanislas Guerini	RE
Minister for Sport and the Olympic & Paralympic Games	Amélie Oudéa-Castéra	RE

Deputy Ministers

Portfolio	Attached minister	Name	Party
Minister for Democratic Renewal, Government Spokesman	Prime Minister	Olivier Véran	RE
Minister for Relations with Parliament	Prime Minister	Franck Riester	RE
Minister for Gender Equality, Diversity and Equal Opportunities	Prime Minister	Bérangère Couillard	RE
Minister for Industry	Minister of Economy, Finances and Industrial & Digital Sovereignty	Roland Lescure	RE
Minister for Digital Transition and Telecommunications	Minister of Economy, Finances and Industrial & Digital Sovereignty	Jean-Noël Barrot	MoDem
Minister for Small and Medium Enterprises, Trade, Crafts and Tourism	Minister of Economy, Finances and Industrial & Digital Sovereignty	Olivia Grégoire	RE
Minister for Public Accounts	Minister of Economy, Finances and Industrial & Digital Sovereignty	Thomas Cazenave	RE
Minister for Territorial Collectivities and Rural Affairs	Minister of the Interior and Overseas; Minister for Ecological Transition and Territorial Cohesion	Dominique Faure	PR
Minister of Overseas	Minister of the Interior and Overseas	Philippe Vigier	MoDem
Minister for Foreign Trade, Attractiveness and French Nationals Abroad	Minister for Europe and Foreign Affairs	Olivier Becht	RE
Minister for Education and Vocational Training	Minister of Labour, Employment and Integration; Minister of National Education and Youth	Carole Grandjean	RE
Minister of Transport	Minister for Ecological Transition and Territorial Cohesion	Clément Beaune	RE
Minister for Housing	Minister for Ecological Transition and Territorial Cohesion	Patrice Vergriete	SE
Minister for People with Disabilities	Minister for Solidarity and Family	Fadila Khattabi	RE

State Secretaries

Portfolio	Attached minister	Name	Party
State Secretary for Children	Prime Minister	Charlotte Caubel	SE
State Secretary for the Sea	Prime Minister	Hervé Berville	RE
State Secretary for Cities	Minister of the Interior and Overseas; Minister for Ecological Transition and Territorial Cohesion	Sabrina Agresti-Roubache	RE
State Secretary for Citizenship	Minister of the Interior and Overseas	Sabrina Agresti-Roubache	RE
State Secretary for European Affairs	Minister of Europe and Foreign Affairs	Laurence Boone	SE
State Secretary for Development, the Francophonie, and International Partnerships	Minister of Europe and Foreign Affairs	Chrysoula Zacharopoulou	RE
State Secretary for Youth and National Universal Service	Minister of the Armed Forces; Minister of National Education and Youth	Prisca Thévenot	RE
State Secretary for Veterans and Remembrance	Minister of the Armed Forces	Patricia Mirallès	RE
State Secretary for Biodiversity	Minister for Ecological Transition and Territorial Cohesion	Sarah El Haïry	MoDem

== Civil service ==
- Jean-Denis Combrexelle, Chief of Staff to the Prime Minister (replacing Aurélien Rousseau in July 2023)
- Hugo Bevort, Deputy Chief of Staff to the Prime Minister (replacing Etienne Champion in July 2023)
