= 2023 French pension reform law =

Law that raises the retirement age from 62 to 64

2023 pension reform law

French Parliament
- Long title: 2023 Social Security Financing Adjustment Law (French: Loi de financement rectificative de la sécurité sociale pour 2023)
- Citation: Law no. 2023-270 (LOI n° 2023-270)
- Enacted by: Senate
- Enacted by: National Assembly
- Signed by: President Emmanuel Macron
- Signed: 14 April 2023
- Vetoed by: Group of Deputies
- Type of veto: Constitutional
- Holding: Constitutional Council decided on laws constitutionality

Legislative history

First chamber: Senate
- Introduced by: Borne government
- Passed: 16 March 2023
- Voting summary: 193 voted for; 114 voted against

Second chamber: National Assembly
- Member(s) in charge: Borne government
- Passed: 20 March 2023
- Voting summary: 295, by not voting for a motion of censure which would have prevented the bill from passing, effectively voted for; 278, by voting for said motion of censure, effectively voted against

Summary
- Raises the retirement age
- Status: Current legislation

In 2023, a law was passed in France that raises the retirement age from 62 to 64 with a requirement that the retiree has worked at least 43 years. Its provisions, which sparked strikes, were highly controversial, as was Prime Minister Élisabeth Borne's invocation of Article 49.3 of the French Constitution, allowing a draft law to pass without a vote unless the Assembly adopts a motion of no confidence within a set time. Two such motions were filed within the required timeframe, and both of them were voted down on 20 March.

The law was to deal with a pension system budget deficit projected to reach €13.5 billion per year by 2030.

== History ==
On 30 January, the bill was introduced to the National Assembly. In February, the Assembly debated the measure. On 14 February, Article 2 of the draft law was rejected by the Assembly by a vote of 203 to 256. On 17 February, Borne invoked Article 47-1 of the Constitution. Said Article states that if the National Assembly has not considered all provisions of a social security financing bill within 20 days of its being introduced, said bill may be transmitted to and considered by the Senate notwithstanding the fact the draft law has not been yet approved by the Assembly in its entirety; it furthermore dictates that after the Senate passes the bill, the latter must be considered by a Joint Committee, which can amend it. The text adopted by the committee is then put up to a vote in both houses of Parliament, which at that point can only vote in favor or against the whole bill, without being able to further amend it. Article 47-1 was employed to circumvent the effort of opposition Deputies, which had introduced thousands of amendments to try to obstruct it.

On 11 March, the Senate passed the bill in a 195–112 vote, with the Senate Republicans and the Rally of Democrats, Progressive and Independent group voting in favour. On 15 March, a Joint Committee considered the bill, ultimately approving it with some amendments in a 10–4 vote. On 16 March, the Senate voted 193–114 to accept the amendments proposed by the committee. Later the same day the Government, fearing the proposed law would not have enough support to pass in the National Assembly, invoked Article 49-3 of the Constitution, engaging its responsibility on the bill. This special procedure allows the bill to automatically pass without a vote unless a motion of no confidence in the government is tabled within 24 hours, in which case the bill is only adopted after said motion is defeated. Two such motions were consequently filed by opposition groups within the required timeframe. Both of them were voted down on 20 March, allowing the bill to pass.

On 14 April, the Constitutional Council issued a ruling on a legal challenge to the bill filed by opposition MPs, finding the draft law to be constitutional and rejecting an initial request for a referendum. Later the same day, Macron signed the bill into law. The Constitutional Council rejected a second referendum request on 3 May.

== Plans to scrap pension reform ==
On 23 July 2024, following the victory of the New Popular Front in the 2024 French legislative election, La France Insoumise proposed to scrap the pension reform plans in a vote, receiving support from the National Rally.

== See also ==
- 2023 French pension reform strikes
- Pensions in France
- Social security in France

International:

- Retirement in Europe
- Retirement age, international
