= Pap Ndiaye =

French historian and politician

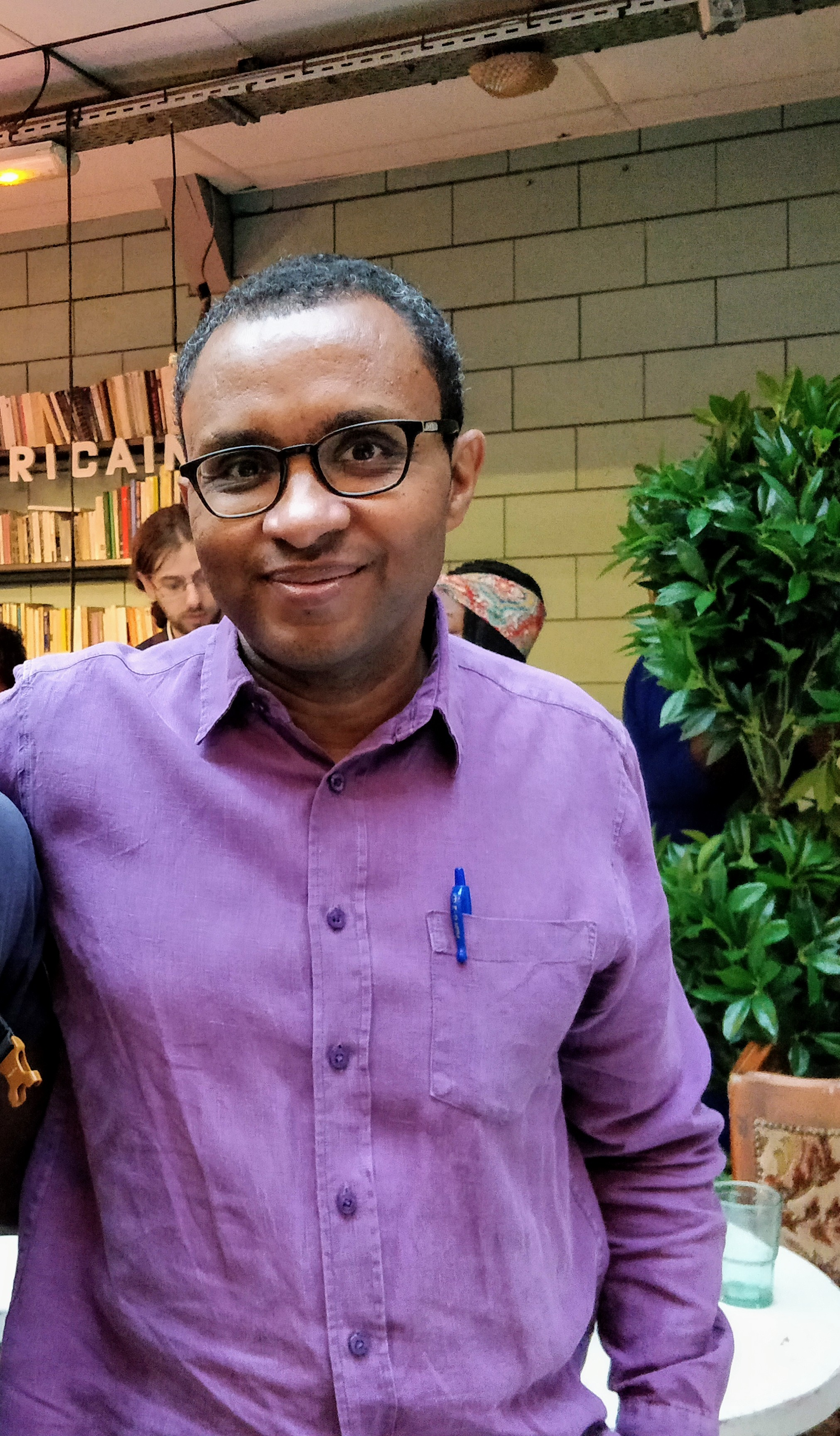
- Ndiaye in 2018

Minister of National Education and Youth
- In office 20 May 2022 – 20 July 2023
- Prime Minister: Élisabeth Borne
- Preceded by: Jean-Michel Blanquer
- Succeeded by: Gabriel Attal

Personal details
- Born: Papa N'Diaye; 25 October 1965 (age 60) Antony, France
- Party: Socialist Party (1980s)
- Spouse: Jeanne Lazarus
- Education: Lycée Lakanal; Lycée Henri-IV
- Alma mater: École normale supérieure de lettres et sciences humaines University of Virginia; École des Hautes Études en Sciences Sociales
- Profession: Historian

Pap Ndiaye (French pronunciation: [pap ɛndjaj]) is a French historian and politician who has been serving as France's ambassador to the Council of Europe since 2023.

Ndiaye was a professor at the School for Advanced Studies in the Social Sciences and then, since 2012, at Sciences Po. He served as Minister of National Education and Youth in the government of Prime Minister Élisabeth Borne between May 2022 and July 2023.

As an academic, Ndiaye focused on transnational philosophies of race that draw both from American and French political thought, especially as they apply to the African diaspora populations of both countries. His appointment to the government by President Emmanuel Macron drew criticisms from the far-right and parts of the traditional right.

== Early life and education ==
Ndiaye was born in Antony, Hauts-de-Seine, south of Paris, to a Senegalese father and a French mother. His sister is the writer Marie NDiaye, winner of the 2009 Prix Goncourt (she spells their surname with two uppercase letters, whereas he spells it with one).

Ndiaye studied at the Lycée Henri-IV before graduating from the École normale supérieure de lettres et sciences humaines in 1986, and obtained the Agrégation in history. Ndiaye obtained his PhD in history from the School for Advanced Studies in the Social Sciences. From 1991 to 1996, Ndiaye conducted research in the United States as preparation for a thesis about the history of the petrochemical corporation DuPont. As the son of a Senegalese father and a French mother, he has credited his time at the University of Virginia with exposing him to themes of racism in the United States that prompted his interest in seriously studying the topic.

== Career in academia ==
Upon returning to France, Ndiaye became a lecturer at the School for Advanced Studies in the Social Sciences. The focus of his research agenda became understanding the history of racially discrimatory practices in France and in America. He was one of the first researchers in France to compare the history of the African diaspora in France and in the United States. Together with Patrick Lozès, the future president of the Representative Council of France's Black Associations, Ndiaye co-founded the Action Committee for the Promotion of Diversity in France.

In 2012, Ndiaye became a faculty member at Sciences Po. He has been a member of the Centre d'études nord-américaines (Center for North American studies) and has been an editor of the journal L'Histoire. He has also published pieces in the news media.

In February 2021, Ndiaye was made director of the French national museum of immigration (the Palais de la Porte Dorée, Musée national de l'histoire de l'immigration and Aquarium tropical).

== Political career ==
In May 2022, Ndiaye was designated the new Minister of National Education and Youth by President Emmanuel Macron in Prime Minister Élisabeth Borne's government. Ndiaye had previously been a critic of Macron, stating in 2019: "it is difficult to discern a policy, or even a consistent point of view".

Ndiaye's surprise appointment came with widespread criticism from the far-right, Marine Le Pen, Jordan Bardella, and Éric Zemmour, but also some Republicans. The weekly Marianne presented him as "the importer of black studies in France" and called his positioning an "ambivalence". In 2017, Ndiaye had comments on structural racism in France, explaining that according to him there is racism in the State, which can be found in some institutions like police, but it's not a racism from the State In a 2021 interview with Le Monde, Ndiaye stated he did not experience racism growing up in France and only "realised that [he] was black" when he was 25 while studying in the United States.

A poll conducted towards 1002 persons in the late summer 2022 by CSA for CNews found that 62% of respondents (24% not at all, 38% rather not) did not fully trust Ndiaye to fulfil his duties as Education Minister.

The head of the educational trade union (SGEN-CFDT), Catherine Nave-Bekhti, as well as educational specialist Philippe Meirieu, and former education minister Najat Vallaud-Belkacem suggested that Pap Ndiaye lost his position as Education Minister on 20 July in part due to his reply the week before to the constant criticism from CNews and Europe 1, in which he said that these two outlets, owned by billionaire Vincent Bolloré, had become far-right news outlets.

== Selected works ==
- Du nylon et des bombes: DuPont de Nemours, le marché et l'État américain (Of nylon and bombs: Dupont de Nemours, the market and the American state), 2001
- La Condition noire (The Black condition), 2008
- Les Noirs américains : en marche pour l'égalité (Black Americans: On the march for equality), 2009
- Histoire de Chicago , Paris, Fayard, 2013 (avec Andrew Diamond)
- Les Noirs américains: De l'esclavage à Black Lives Matter, 2021

== Selected awards ==
- Jean-Michel Gaillard Award (2008)
- Knight of the Legion of Honour (2021)
