= François Braun =

French politician and physician (born 1962)

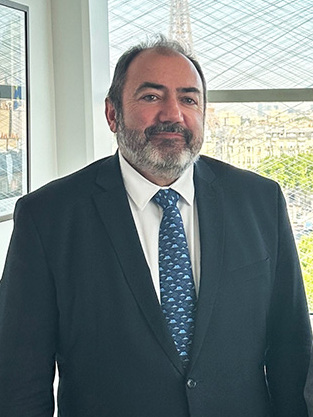
- Braun in 2023

Minister of Health and Prevention
- In office 4 July 2022 – 20 July 2023
- Prime Minister: Élisabeth Borne
- Preceded by: Brigitte Bourguignon
- Succeeded by: Aurélien Rousseau

Personal details
- Born: 24 August 1962 (age 63) Belfort, France
- Party: Independent
- Profession: Physician

François Braun (born 24 August 1962) is a French emergency doctor and politician who served as Minister of Health and Prevention in the government of Prime Minister Élisabeth Borne from 4 July 2022 to 20 July 2023.

== Early life and career ==
Braun chose to study medicine to become an emergency doctor and to respect the family tradition. In this regard, he said: "My grandfather and my great-grandfather were military doctors. As for my father, he was a general practitioner and chief medical officer of the fire department in the Territoire de Belfort. With each accident, day or night, he went to the field.

In the fifth year of medicine, Braun became an emergency physician at the regional and university hospital center of Nancy in 1984. This activity in its infancy was then not very anchored within hospitals, he became over the years a pioneer in this discipline so that it is recognized as a medical specialty in its own right.

From 2010, he was head of the emergency department of the Mercy hospital of the regional hospital center of Metz-Thionville.

Previously Secretary General, Braun chaired the SAMU - Urgences de France union from 2014.

At the end of 2016, in collaboration with Patrick Pelloux and Pierre Carli, he spoke of the importance of training hospital staff in war medicine.

== Political career ==
In June 2022, François Braun was charged by Emmanuel Macron with a "flash mission" on the deficiencies of the hospital in France. François Braun submits a non-final version of his report on June 30. This appointment is not unanimous in the hospital world, because of his rather liberal vision of the hospital. Among the 41 recommendations, François Braun mainly defends that access to emergencies must be regulated according to a "sorting principle" via telephone regulation or at the entrance to emergencies, to treat vital emergencies as a priority and redirect other patients to duty doctors.

In July 2022, Braun was appointed Minister of Health and Prevention in the Élisabeth Borne government.
