= Federation of General Unions of National Education =

Trade union of France

The Federation of General Unions of National Education (French: Fédération des syndicats généraux de l'Éducation nationale, SGEN) is a trade union representing education workers in France.

The union was founded in October 1937, by Guy Raynaud de Lage, François Henry and Paul Vignaux. Despite being a secular union, it decided to join the French Confederation of Christian Workers (CFTC), in preference to the secular but left-wing General Confederation of Labour (CGT). The union argued that the CFTC should also become a secular organisation, and this was achieved in 1964, when the majority of the federation became the French Democratic Confederation of Labour.

By 1995, the union claimed 40,700 members, but by 2017, this had fallen to 24,952.

== General Secretaries ==
1937: Guy Raynaud de Lage
1944: Marcel Reinhard
1946: Guy Raynaud de Lage
1948: Paul Vignaux
1970: Charles Pietri
1972: François Garrigue
1977: Roger Lépiney
1980: Patrice Béghain
1983: Michel Vergnolle
1986: Jean-Michel Boullier
1998: Jean-Luc Villeneuve
2007: Thierry Cadart
2012: Frédéric Sève
2016: Catherine Nave-Bekhti
