= Jean-Christophe Combe =

French politician (born 1981)

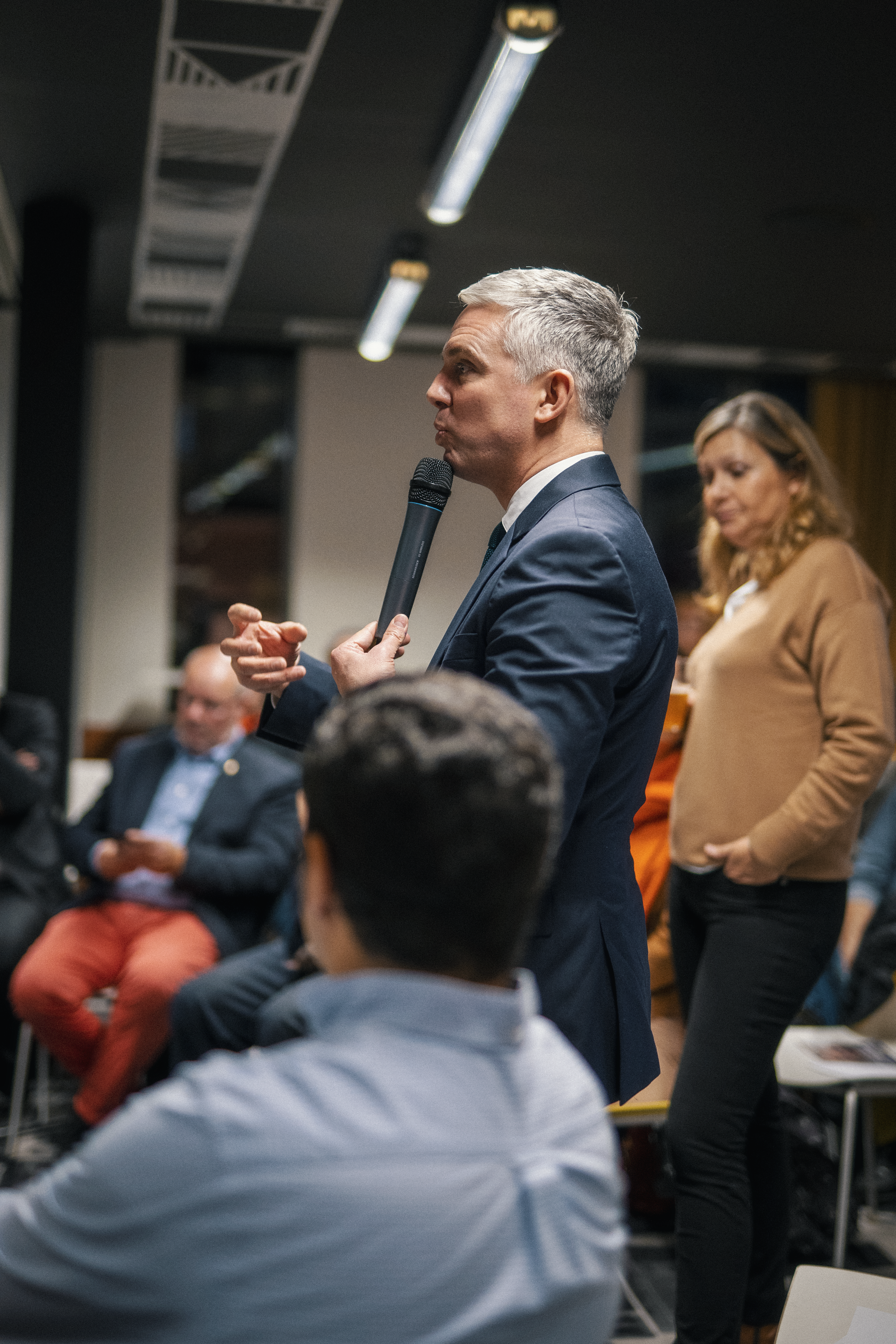

Minister for Solidarity, Autonomy and the Disabled
- In office 4 July 2022 – 20 July 2023
- Prime Minister: Élisabeth Borne
- Preceded by: Damien Abad
- Succeeded by: Aurore Bergé

Personal details
- Born: 14 September 1981 (age 44) Sainte-Menehould, France
- Education: Paris 1 Panthéon-Sorbonne University; Sciences Po
- Occupation: Politician

Jean-Christophe Combe (French pronunciation: [ʒɑ̃ kʁistɔf kɔ̃b]; born 14 September 1981) is a French politician who served as Minister of Solidarity, Autonomy and People with Disabilities in the government of Prime Minister Élisabeth Borne from 2022 to 2023.

== Early life and education ==
Combe's father is a gymnastics teacher, and his mother is a craftsman. After studying in literary preparatory classes at the Lycée Claude-Monet, he obtained a degree in history at the University of Paris I Panthéon Sorbonne. He graduated from the Paris Institute of Political Studies in 2005. During his studies, he was a technical adviser to the Senate, within the Centrist Union group.

== Early career ==
Winner of the IEP de Paris, Combe joined Deloitte as an associate specializing in the public sector. He left Deloitte a year later, in 2007, when he was appointed chief of staff to the deputy and mayor of Châlons-en-Champagne, Bruno Bourg-Broc (UMP). In 2009, he became chief of staff to the UMP mayor of Saint-Germain-en-Laye, Emmanuel Lamy.

In 2011, Combe was appointed director of the cabinet of the president of the French Red Cross, Jean-François Mattei. Between 2012 and 2015, he was director of commitment and community life for the French Red Cross. In 2016, he became Acting Director General of the French Red Cross, then in 2017, Director General.

== Political career ==
Combe became Minister of Solidarity, Autonomy and People with Disabilities on 4 July 2022, replacing Damien Abad, in the government of Élisabeth Borne.

== Transport career ==
In January 2024 Combe joined French transport company Keolis as Director of Marketing, Innovation, Sustainable Development and Engagement.
