= Article 49 of the French Constitution =

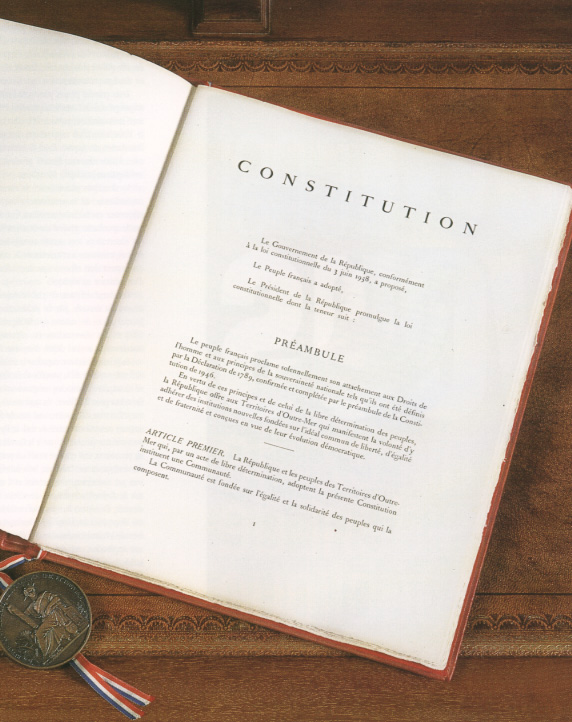
The Constitution of the Fifth Republic of France (1958)

Article 49 of the French Constitution is an article of the French Constitution, the fundamental law of the Fifth French Republic. It sets out and structures the political responsibility of the government (the executive branch) towards the parliament (legislative branch). It is part of Title V: "On relations between the parliament and the government" (Articles 34 through 51), and with the intention of maintaining the stability of the French executive the section provides legislative alternatives to the parliament. It was written into the constitution to counter the perceived weakness of the Fourth Republic, such as "deadlock" and successive rapid government takeovers, by giving the government the ability to pass bills without the approbation of the parliament, possible under Section 3 of Article 49.

The article, which comprises four paragraphs, was designed to prevent crises like those that occurred under the Fourth Republic. (Note: In twelve years (1946–1958), France went through 22 different governments—an average duration of six months per government—and 375 days of ministerial crises.) Its best-known provision, paragraph 3 (Article 49.3), allows the government to force passage of a law without a vote, unless the parliament passes a motion of no confidence. A motion of no confidence rarely passes, since it also entails the dissolution of the legislature pending new elections. Article 49 provides for:

- an engagement de responsabilité (commitment of responsibility) of the administration to a certain program or declaration of policy, initiated by the executive branch. This measure should not be confused with the "question of confidence", which no longer exists under the French Fifth Republic.
- a motion de censure (vote of no confidence), initiated by the Assemblée Nationale (National Assembly).
- administration option to force passage of a legislative text without a vote through an engagement de responsabilité, unless the National Assembly is prepared to overturn it with a motion de censure.
- an administration option to request approval of its policy by the French Senate, although the refusal of this approval would have consequences in the judicial branch

Article 49 paragraph 2 outlines a censure spontanée (spontaneous motion of no confidence), as opposed to the following paragraph 49.3, which outlines a motion of no confidence in some way "provoked" by the executive branch. Such a motion requires an absolute majority of members to vote for its adoption, and thus this provision changes the burden of proof and forces the Assemblée Nationale to reject the entire administration. The government cannot be overturned by counting the votes of undecided Assembly members who would simply abstain. This paragraph of Article 49 has only come into play once, in 1962 against Georges Pompidou, who then had to resign, but returned to power with newfound support after winning a decisive majority in the ensuing legislative elections.

Articles 50, 50.1 and 51 relate directly to Article 49, since Article 50 complements 49.2, Article 51 provides technical detail about the implementation of Article 49.3, and 50.1 gives the executive an option for a declaration with an ensuing debate.

== Amendments of 1 March 2009 ==
Article 49 of the constitution was amended by the constitutional legislation of 4 August 1995 and of 23 July 2008.

The original version of the article, when there were two legislative sessions a year, stated: "if a vote of no confidence is rejected, its supporters cannot introduce another in the same session." Since 1995 there has been a single (ordinary) session a year, apart from extraordinary sessions; a deputy may sign no more than three motions of censure in a single ordinary session and an additional such motion in an extraordinary session. In the original version, no limit was placed on the administration's use of engagement of responsibility. Since 2009, the prime minister can only use the administration engagement of responsibility for

- finance laws
- laws that finance social security
- no more than one other legislative project per session

== Speeches ==
=== Michel Debré's speech before the Council of State ===
On 27 August 1958 Michel Debré, then the Minister of Justice and one of the principal drafters of the new constitution, introduced the draft project in the General Assembly of the Council of State. Section 49 was mentioned in a brief passage that set out its spirit and motivations:

"The difficult procedure for a motion of no confidence must temper the defect that we know well, and for too long. The question de confiance (question of confidence) is the weapon of the administration, and it alone. Deputies can use only the motion of no confidence, and such a motion is surrounded by conditions discussed only by those who do not want to remember. Experience has led, moreover, to provide a somewhat unique disposition to ensure, despite maneuvers, passage of an essential piece of legislation."

=== Charles de Gaulle's 31 January 1964 press conference ===
In a press conference on 31 January 1964, General Charles de Gaulle returned to the topic of the functioning of institutions. His reading gave the French President a primacy well beyond the letter of the constitution, but often consistent with practice. He addressed, among other topics, the issue of the motion of no confidence:

"[...] relations between the minister and the parliament, as they are governed by the Constitution, call for a motion of no confidence only under conditions that give this rupture an extraordinarily serious character. In such an extreme case, the president, responsible for ensuring the continuity of the state, also has the means to do so, since he has recourse to the nation, and can make it the judge of the dispute through new elections, or a referendum, or both. So, there is still a democratic ending."

=== March 2023 ===
In March 2023 French president Emmanuel Macron used the provision to increase the age of retirement in France, provoking outrage and street demonstrations, His administration had passed budget legislation in this way on ten previous occasions. A motion of no confidence also ensued, which the government narrowly survived. At that point Article 49 had been used 89 times since 1958 by governments of all ideologies.

== Vote of confidence (Article 49.1) ==
The first subparagraph of Article 49 allows the prime minister to commit the responsibility of his government before the National Assembly. This is sometimes described as a motion of confidence. As provided in Article 50, a simple majority vote against the motion leads to the resignation of the administration. This contrasts with the two following paragraphs, which protect the executive to a greater extent. The meaning of 49.1 is sometimes imprecise, and therefore its interpretation is disputed, particularly as to whether the commitment of responsibility is optional or compulsory. In practice it is viewed as optional, and the president retains a clear supremacy. Thus, the motion of confidence is a weapon at the disposal only of the government. The political benefit its use can provide remains limited, however, even though the motion of confidence still remains an important parliamentary tradition that can sometimes give an administration some advantages in its relations with parliament, as well as with public opinion.

An administration which cannot rely on a majority can eschew the use of this measure without much inconvenience.

=== Disputed interpretation ===
The word engager (to commit, or to "make [something] an issue") in Section 49.1 is particularly subject to controversy. It can be interpreted as a requirement, as in parliamentary régimes, or simply an ability, giving priority to the separation of powers and the prerogatives of the president.

The Constitution of the Fourth Republic of France also stated that "the president of the Cabinet and the ministers cannot be nominated until after the president of the cabinet has been invested with the confidence of the assembly" (Article 45), which was also the practice of the Third Republic.

Nevertheless, the President of the Republic nominates the members of the administration (Article 8), without reference to a possible confirmation by the Assembly. Article 20 makes clear, by referring to articles 49 and 50, that the president is responsible to the parliament, but this is not conditioned on a "commitment of responsibility", and even when it is required, no deadline is given, which limits the requirement, which in reality comes down to at most a moral imperative. Michel Debré, before the Conseil d'État, also interpreted the clause as an optional, even before the constitution's adoption: "the weapon of the government and of it alone". But in his first speech of general policy, Debré said on this topic that "the text does not say explicitly that he must do so, but the spirit of the Constitution is clear." This difficulty with regards to the semantic connotation of the indicative mood is not the only semantic issue affecting the Constitution; one could also bring up the debate of 1960 about Article 29, "Parliament shall convene in extraordinary session... at the request... of the majority of the members of the National Assembly, to consider a specific agenda." and the quarrel in 1986 about Article 13: "The president of the republic shall sign the ordinances..."

The text mentions a requirement for Cabinet deliberation, and legal doctrine has debated whether the term implies agreement amongst the Cabinet or simply discussion, which would in that case leave the decision to the prime minister alone. Administrations have always spoken of authorization or of the agreement of the Cabinet. This phrasing has the additional advantage of solidifying the interpretation of the commitment of responsibility as optional, since the prime minister could hardly be required to commit the responsibility of the government and also prevented from doing so without the agreement of the full Cabinet. The Constitutional Council validated the commitment of the responsibility of the government (Section 3) with the phrasing "to the extent that the Cabinet had deliberated [...] the commitment of responsibility" without mentioning authorization. Since the administrations of the Fifth Republic have always been more united than those of prior coalition governments, the question of a possible disagreement between the prime minister and the Cabinet remains theoretical. In any case, this deliberation does not give the president, especially in a period of "cohabitation", the power to prevent the commitment of his responsibility, except in the improbable case of a refusal to enter the question on the agenda of the Cabinet.

Lastly, there is the distinction between a "program" and a "declaration of general policy". If the former can be understood as a catalogue of the principal measures that the government hopes to undertake, probably as soon as it is established, and the latter as an explanation of its reasoning and of its intentions in a precise domain which would have—or to which the government wishes to give—particular importance, the distinction has no practical consequence. Certain prime ministers have used the expression "declaration of general policy" while they were speaking for the first time before the Assembly. The Constitutional Council remarked, incidentally, that article 49 "tends to confer an analogous meaning" to the two terms.

=== A presidential system ===
De Gaulle in his Second Bayeux Speech (deuxième discours de Bayeux of 1946, which explained his views on political institutions) did not want a parliamentary system, at least not in the monistic sense which had prevailed since the end of the 19th century: "It goes without saying that the parliament, which is composed of two chambers and which exercises legislative power, cannot be the source of executive power." As an important concession, however, which averted a strictly presidential regime, the head of state must "reconcile the general interest regarding the choice of the people with an orientation that is free from the parliament." The first governments of the Fifth Republic, those that set the precedent for later governments, committed their responsibility in front of the assembly after their appointment. They did this, however, always emphasizing that they proceeded from the president of the Republic and not the parliament, and that it was not an investiture. But after the presidential election of December 1965, Prime Minister Georges Pompidou became once again head of a third government, and waited for the opening of the common session of the parliament in April to present his program, making a simple declaration followed by a debate without a vote, and thus without a commitment of responsibility, although he had a solid parliamentary majority. Then, he stated that he wanted to create a precedent establishing the optional character of this commitment. After the general election of 1967, his fourth government had diminished to a narrow and uncertain majority, and he used the same solution.

François Mitterrand attacked the Assembly, saying:

"The simple language and the grammar [...] demonstrate in the clearest way that the prime minister has to commit the responsibility of his government to his program, and that this obligation, so decided, imposes itself upon him in a strict way."

Pompidou challenged the opposition to censure his government. The interruption of this practice persisted after the parliamentary dissolution of May 1968 even when the executive faced a crushing and disciplined majority in parliament, showing that the practice is considered optional. (Some commitments of responsibility did occur, but not immediately after the nomination of the government.) The practice was renewed in 1974 and afterwards was followed sporadically. It disappeared again between 1988 and 1993 when the socialist governments, whose support did not reach a majority in the parliament, no longer could resort to the vote of confidence except on a single specific occasion: while France was engaged in the Gulf War, Prime Minister Michel Rocard obtained very wide support in the Assembly, but stated that:

"[...] those who voted in favor would not be presumed to support the general policy of the government in any way."

Lacking a guaranteed majority, it is preferable for the government to wait for a motion of no confidence as described in paragraph 2, as the adoption of a motion of no confidence is more difficult than simply refusing a vote of confidence. One category of government did, however, systematically require the confidence of, and almost investiture by, the Assembly upon coming into office: cohabitation governments. These derive politically, if not legally, from the Assembly rather than from the President and must have its support; the régime thus functions in a more clearly parliamentary fashion.

engagement de responsabilité in the Fifth Republic
Prime minister	Term	Engagements
Michel Debré	1959 - 1962	2
Georges Pompidou	1962 - 1968	2
Maurice Couve de Murville	1968 - 1969	0
Jacques Chaban-Delmas	1969 - 1972	3
Pierre Messmer	1972 - 1974	1
Jacques Chirac	1974 - 1976	1
Raymond Barre	1976 - 1981	2
Pierre Mauroy	1981 - 1984	5
Laurent Fabius	1984 - 1986	1
Jacques Chirac	1986 - 1988	3
Michel Rocard	1988 - 1991	1
Édith Cresson	1991 - 1992	0
Pierre Bérégovoy	1992 - 1993	1
Édouard Balladur	1993 - 1995	2
Alain Juppé	1995 - 1997	3
Lionel Jospin	1997 - 2002	1
Jean-Pierre Raffarin	2002 - 2005	2
Dominique de Villepin	2005 - 2007	1
François Fillon	2007 - 2012	3
Jean-Marc Ayrault	2012 - 2014	1
Manuel Valls	2014 - 2016	2
Bernard Cazeneuve	2016 - 2017	1
Édouard Philippe	2017 - 2020	2
Jean Castex	2020 - 2022	1
Total		41

=== A limited tool for the prime minister ===
When invoking the vote de confiance (motion of confidence) in the National Assembly, the prime minister generally took the opportunity to make an important political statement. This parliamentary ritual gave the motion some formality, and the event would be widely commented upon by the media. For many years, it was the best format for making political policy speeches, that is, before the television interview appeared in its various forms, offering alternatives. It is a mark of courtesy and deference to parliament. It allows the new prime minister to put forward his positions and pledge the soundness of his government. The refusal to make commitments is seen as an admission of the majority's weakness. Apart from the prime minister's nomination, the motion of confidence allows the government to deliver a new declaration on matters and events that may impose themselves or to which the government wishes to give importance.

On the other hand, under the Fifth Republic, it is no longer possible, as under previous Republics, to attach motions of confidence to votes of law to force the assembly to vote on the combined motion and the proposed law. Under prior practices, the government could link its continued existence to the adoption of legislation. The Fifth Republic provides for a much more powerful weapon with Paragraph 3 (see below).

A question de confiance may also help an administration in its relations with its majority in the legislative branch, reassuring deputies who are worried about the popularity of their party, through a victory in the Assembly which was all but assured, rallying the troops with a clear contrast to the opposition, and if necessary force a difficult coalition partner, such as the Rassemblement pour la République between 1976 and 1981, or Communist Party between 1981 and 1986, to reaffirm its allegiance to the majority.

However, its scope is limited and unless the prime minister's speech is particularly effective, will do little to change the popularity of the administration and its majority. As for the reluctant coalition partners, they may vote to pass the motion of confidence while voicing reservations and criticisms. However, where the measure is narrowly focused they are especially tied to their assenting vote, as opposed to a broad statement of administration support, which does not prevent disavowal of certain of its aspects. Finally, the vote of confidence does not strengthen the prime minister's position with respect to the president. Prime Minister Jacques Chaban-Delmas on 24 May 1972 asked for and obtained the confidence of the Assembly, not without clearly reaffirming that the administration proceeds from the president, who may at any time put an end to its functions. (This is the custom outside periods of cohabitation (minority government), but not the law: the president names the government, but only ends its functions if he resigns). President Georges Pompidou had recently agreed to this engagement de responsabilité, remarking that this was a prerogative of the prime minister. He would some time later say "I was not in favor and this was known". Five weeks later, he asked for and obtained the resignation of Chaban-Delmas.

== Vote of no confidence (49.2) ==
A vote of no confidence (censure) allows the National Assembly, on its own initiative, to force the government to resign. The vote's application and action by the parliament, in this regard, is an essential characteristic of any parliamentary system. De Gaulle, when inaugurated as prime minister under the Fourth Republic, promised he would include this procedure in the proposed reform of institutions. It was actually imposed by the Constitutional Law of 3 June 1958.

In the constitution, the government's responsibility is framed by devices that allow it to streamline the parliamentarian system to promote stability of government. However, it is difficult to ascribe actual stability of the governments with these technical measures. The strength is due to two other factors. First, if a vote of non-confidence is approved by the National Assembly, the government, instead of resigning, is likely to ask the president to dissolve the Assembly to stop it from voting. On the other hand, the Fifth Republic has been characterized by stable political parties and reliable electoral coalitions able to effectively support the government. All these elements have reduced no confidence votes by parliamentarians. To date, a vote of censure has passed only once.

=== Key element of the regime ===
The possibility of the National Assembly bringing down the government, even if it is unused, has a deep impact on the workings of the institutions. Without it, the French constitution would clearly define a presidential system, albeit with strong powers endowed to the executive branch by the constitution. For even without a majority in the National Assembly, the president would still be able to nominate a government to suit himself, and avail himself in this way of all of his powers, subject to contreseing (countersignature) (Article 19 of the French Constitution), notably the power to nominate (Article 13 of the French Constitution), while the government would have the power to regulate (Article 37), and the considerable powers offered to him by the constitution in his relations with the parliament (the essential part of Title V). If he also has the support of the Senate, he could block any initiative of the Assemblée nationale with which he disagrees; or at least, he could considerably impede it. It would still be impossible for him to have the legislation he desires enacted, and above all the necessity to reach every year a compromise with the Assemblée to pass the budget. He would still be much better armed against the legislative branch than is, for example, the president of the United States, the archetype of the presidential form of government.

On the contrary, given the threat of a motion of no confidence, a hostile majority in the National Assembly leads the president to name a government from this majority. ("Compatible" is the word used in the Bayeux speech), an institutional operating mode known as "cohabitation" ever since it emerged for the first time following the 1986 legislative elections. This government would then have available the fundamentals of executive power, and could rely on its majority in the Assembly. Article 49.2 thus imposes coherency between the government and the parliamentary majority (to the extent that such a majority exists), a characteristic of modern parliamentary regimes, even if the head of state disposes in the government of much wider powers than in other European regimes.

=== Well-supervised implementation ===
Subparagraph 2 relates, through parlementarisme rationalisé (rationalized parliamentarism) to making it difficult both to introduce a vote of no confidence as well as to adopt one. Its goal is to avoid government instability and thus ensure "that a government exists which is made to govern, to which is given the time and the possibility to do so", as de Gaulle said in his 4 September 1958 speech at the Place de la République.

Introducing a motion of no confidence is limited by requiring for each motion of censure the signature of one tenth at least of the deputies, each of whom may only sign three such motions during an ordinary session under Article 28. (Prior to the 1995 constitutional reform, a single motion for each of the two ordinary sessions in a year), or for each extraordinary session under Article 29. The consequences of this restriction are minor, since the opposition generally does not run out of authorized motions. The most visible consequence is that when there is more than one opposition party, the smallest (for example, the Front national between 1986 and 1988) cannot introduce such motions, since they would be unable to reach the 10% bar; however such a motion would in any event have had no chance of adoption.

Subparagraph 2 also makes it more difficult to adopt a motion. First, a delay of forty-eight hours must elapse between introduction of a motion and a vote upon it. If the vote looks close, the 48 hour delay may allow the government to convince some of the undecided not to vote for the measure. The constitution thus prevents the interpellation prevalent under the Third Republic, in which a single deputy could challenge the government, and a vote, following debate, for legislation unfavorable to the government could lead to its departure. The Fourth Republic provided for a full day between introduction of a motion and a vote upon it. Next, a majority of the members of the Assembly must vote in favor. This means that more than half of the current members (any vacant seats do not count under the rules of the Assembly) must vote for the motion, rather than just a majority of votes cast. The system does not allow for abstention: a deputy may vote for the motion, or not vote for the motion, in which case he is assumed not to wish to overturn the government. A motion is said to not have been adopted, by the way, meaning that it did not receive majority support, not that it was rejected, which would mean that a majority had voted against; whereas, only supporters of the motion will cast a vote. This mechanism, in a close vote, can assure the survival of the government. The motion that failed with the narrowest margin targeted the government of Pierre Bérégovoy's agricultural policy in June 1992, which lacked only three votes to pass. The procedure of the Fourth Republic was similar, with a nuance: while advocates of censure needed, as they do today, an absolute majority of deputies, all deputies took part in the vote, and thus one could distinguish supporters of the government from those who abstained; while this did not affect the adoption of the motion, the vote could weaken the government by making clear how little support it had.

These precautions were further reinforced by the exclusive character of Article 49 concerning the responsibility of the government being put into play. The Constitutional Council censured any attempt, under organic law or Assembly regulation, which would allow the parliament or an Assembly the possibility of a vote marking defiance of the government, even without a constraining effect, outside of Article 49.

These various rationalization techniques demonstrated their effectiveness for those governments of the Fifth Republic which disposed of only a feeble majority to sustain them. However the same techniques, or almost, that were already present in the constitution of the Fourth Republic completely failed to reach their goal. Most governments of the time however were not formally overturned, but withdrew, having failed to obtain the support thought necessary, or following serious disagreements between ministers. These two causes have now vanished.

=== A conflict of legitimacy ===
The governments of the two preceding Republics (at least after the fall of Patrice de Mac-Mahon) owed all of their legitimacy to the legislative branch, the president of the Republic merely proposing them to the Assemblies, to which he himself incidentally owed his function. Too little support from legislators, even if there was no vote of censure, often caused their resignation. The president of the Fifth Republic has his own legitimacy and considered, outside periods of cohabitation (minority government), that the government was his and responsible to him, which often leads to a parallel between the Fifth Republic and the dualist parliamentary regimes of the first half of the 19th century. Responsibility to the legislative branch subsisted, but the government could consider itself legitimate so long as it was not formally overturned. A vote of no confidence could be interpreted as a conflict between legitimacies, both founded on election, of the president of the Republic and of the Assembly, a conflict which, as de Gaulle explains,"donne à cette rupture un caractère d'extraordinaire gravité". The Assembly should now no longer overturn the government except for a major disagreement, and the President of the Republic, to end a conflict of legitimacy "can have recourse to the nation", by dissolving the Assemblée nationale (Article 12 de la Constitution de la Cinquième République française). This is one of his inherent powers, unconditional in implementation except purely in form, and was indeed used the sole time a motion of censure was voted. The constitution also forbids a vote of no confidence when dissolution is not possible, during a vacancy in the Presidential office or a presidential incapacity. (article 7). The possibility, not to say probability, of this dissolution may have a great dissuasive effect on the Assembly, given that many deputies might risk losing their seats.

=== Majority restraint ===
Apart from the dualist aspects specific to the Fifth Republic, which can also help explain the solidity of governments versus the Assembly, the limits of "technical" rationalisation of parliamentarism have often been remarked upon. The first examples of technical rationalisation, found in constitutions drawn up at the end of World War I, notably that of the Weimar Republic, which also had a strong head of state, totally failed, just as they failed under the Fourth Republic and in the Italian republic.

On the other hand, British parliamentarism, totally without such measures, demonstrated great stability. This stability is often attributed to bipartisme, notably by Michel Debré in his speech to the Conseil d'État or by René Capitant, one of those who inspired the system, both of whom were great admirers of the British system, founded on a single-round majority vote and bipartisan. While Michel Debré judged its transposition to France impossible, majority elections in two rounds, introduced in 1958, led to similar outcomes, with coalitions formed before the election and remaining stable afterwards. Where ordinary law is concerned (Article 34), this election method no doubt contributes more to the stability of governments than the detail of Article 49. At the same time, one may note the effect of changing the election method in Italy in 1993, in the absence of major reform of the constitution, which remained strict monist parliamentarism, incidentally fairly close to that of the Fourth Republic. However, this election method does not always guarantee the existence of a majority, as shown by the English example in the 1920s, or else the composition of the Assemblée nationale between 1988 and 1993.

=== Vote of no confidence of 5 October 1962 ===
A vote of no confidence passed twice under the Fifth Republic, the first time during the 4 October 1962 meeting (in reality on the morning of 5 October). The motion was filed on October 2, after General de Gaulle on 30 September announced a referendum (in accordance with Article 11 of the Constitution) to organize the election of the President of the Republic by direct suffrage. The circumstances of that vote were quite specific. It occurred at the end of the Algerian crisis, which affected the first years of the Fifth Republic, a kind of transitional phase in its history. The vote took place during the first legislature of the Fifth Republic, and put an end to it. The parliamentary elections of 1958 had not resulted in a clear majority, but the president and the Debré government were able to work with the Assembly without a majority in the legislative branch, because the priority was to resolve the Algerian crisis. In the summer of 1962, the crisis ended, and many of the deputies wished to revert to a more parliamentarian system. De Gaulle, by requesting the resignation of Prime Minister Debré, and appointing Georges Pompidou, a non-parliamentarian, seemed not to be moving in this direction.

The motion of no confidence passed easily, the Gaullist party (Union for the New Republic) being the only major group to not vote for it. De Gaulle was moved on 5 October and on 6 October received Pompidou announcing his resignation, as Article 50 forced him to do. De Gaulle took note of the resignation without formally accepting it, requested the government remain in office, and announced the dissolution of the National Assembly on 9 October. De Gaulle won very easily in the 28 October referendum and also in the parliamentary elections on 18 and 25 November. With this last vote, the left recovered from the 1958 elections, in which there had been no alliance between socialists and communists. Conversely, centrist parties, popular and independent Republicans were defeated to the benefit of the UNR, which monopolized the rightist votes. That election, consequence of the vote of no confidence on 5 October, put in place the polarization of political life in France. Pompidou's new government was appointed after the elections.

The announcement of the referendum, which was preceded by a few rumors in the summer, caused considerable excitement. The universal suffrage elections were to change the balance of powers, and would turn the election of the President of the Republic into a referendum, reviving the painful memory of Louis-Napoleon Bonaparte and General Georges Ernest Boulanger. However it was the procedure which was under attack, because De Gaulle choose to revise the constitution with Article 11 and not with Article 89, which requires the consent of the legislative branch. Most parliamentarians believe that this procedure is unconstitutional. This was also the opinion of most experts, of the State Council, whose opinion was leaked to the press, of the Constitutional Council, whose advice remained confidential, and of most of the president's entourage, even of the prime minister. The motion was clearly directed against the President of the Republic. Most of its powers are subject to contreseing (countersignature), which in parliamentary tradition, justify its irresponsabilité, the minister who countersigns endorsing the act. Article 11 is not subject to contreseing, however one cannot speak of inherent power, since the initiative must come from either the government, or the parliament. In this case it came, while as a matter of pure form, from the government, which allowed putting its responsibility into play. The text of the motion however left no doubt as to its target, the government being mentioned only at its end: "The Assemblée nationale [...], Considering that by ignoring the vote by the two chambers the President of the Republic violates the Constitution of which he is the guardian; Considering that he thus opens a breach through which an adventurer could one day go, to overturn the Republic and suppress freedoms; Considering that the President was only able to act based on the proposition of the Government; Censure the Government in conformity with Section 2, of the Constitution. » Its wording is not far from suggesting the use of Title IX, the Haute Cour de Justice (Article 68), the submission of an accusation against the president of the Republic of high treason, rather than just censure of the government.

=== Vote of no confidence of 4 December 2024 ===
On 4 December 2024, a vote of no confidence was passed with 331 votes.

== Commitment of responsibility on a bill (49.3) ==
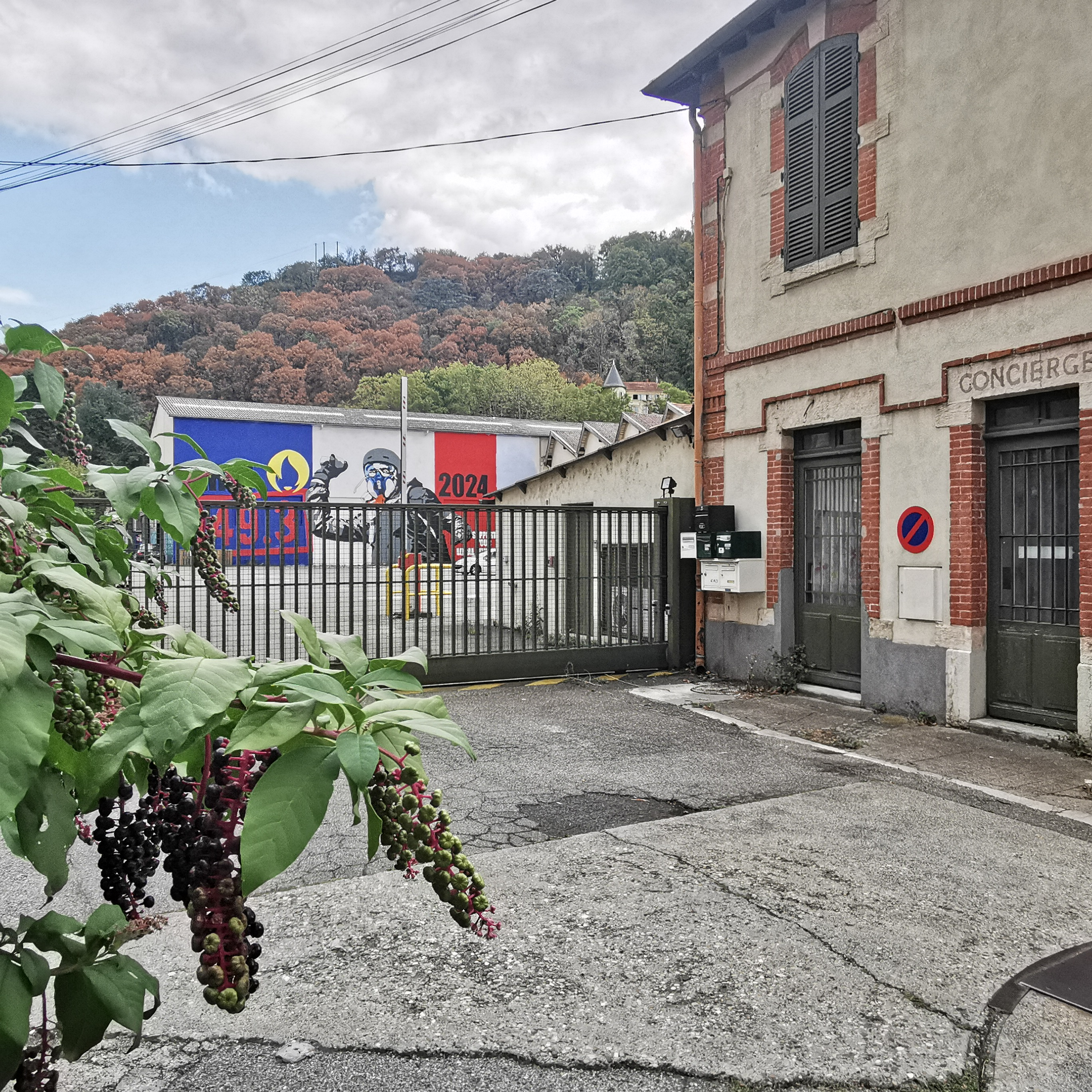
Article 49.3 in street art

Clause 3 allows the government to impose the adoption of a text by the Assembly, immediately and without a vote, which the Assembly cannot oppose without toppling the government through a motion of no confidence under Clause 2. This is one of the best known clauses of the Constitution, often cited by number, "article 49.3" (Note: Frequently also written 49-3 with a hyphen. This format is normally reserved, not for paragraphs, but to interstitial articles of the constitution, full articles which were not originally part of the constitution and were inserted by constitutional reforms in their logical place in the constitution. For example, the article on the laws about financing social security, introduced in 1996 is 47-1, immediately following Article 47 on the law of finance. However there is no Article 49-3, so the notation does not create any ambiguity) or "the forty-nine three." This clause subordinates the legislature to executive power, allowing the government to compel a reluctant majority to pass a legislative text, and to accelerate the legislative process by ending any obstruction from the opposition.

=== Primacy of the executive ===
Article 20 of the Constitution of the Fifth Republic provides that "the government determines and conducts the policy of the nation." This concept differs considerably from the usual definition of an executive power charged with the execution of laws. Determining and conducting the policy of the nation on the contrary implies being its primary author, to which the constitution devotes its article 49, which requires the Assembly to prioritize debating the legislative projects of the government. Although this could be seen as a reduction of democracy in France, it is in line with De Gaulle's wish to bring about a more efficient and stable democracy. The executive is brought to the forefront of the democracy and through this paragraph, gains the power to put in place its promises and its campaign goals. The executive is put in a leading position and assumes its responsibilities. The importance of this article is shown as it brings another direct link between the executive and the people, as is the case in the 5th republic. However, while this helps the executive implement its program, it also puts them in a precarious position. Bills passed under article 49.3 are more scrutinized, and if contested and rejected through the vote of no confidence, could be seen as raising the issue of the government's legitimacy. It would destabilize the executive and force them to dissolve and form a new government.

=== Motion of confidence in a parliamentary system ===
The traditional mechanism of the question of confidence (distinct from the more limited that remains in paragraph 1 under the Fifth Republic) forces the parliament to undertake a blocking of government policy and the quasi-censure implied by the rejection of a project. It may consist simply of the government announcing that it will resign if its project is not adopted. A government may do this informally, in the absence of measures to implement this commitment. This was for example the case under the Third Republic. The action may also be framed by the constitution, generally in a way favorable to the government. In Germany, article 68 of the Fundamental Law of the Federal Republic of Germany provides that if a motion of confidence, which may include adoption of a text, is not adopted by an absolute majority, the Chancellor may ask the President for the dissolution of the Bundestag or the proclamation of a "state of legislative necessity", which for a limited time allows the adoption of laws with assent of a single upper chamber, the Bundesrat. The president is free to accept this request, or not. In any case the non-adoption does not force the government to resign. The resignation of the government may only be obtained if the Bundestag passes a motion of censure with an absolute majority which also designates a new chancellor, known as a "constructive" motion of censure in Article 67.

=== Motion of confidence under the Fourth Republic and the origins of Article 49.3 ===
A motion of confidence caused the fall of numerous governments under the Third Republic. One reason for this was that it was often raised by a single minister without the prior agreement of the government as a whole, and thus the coalition that he represented. The other partners in the coalition could refuse to see their hand forced in this way, and the government fell. Under the Fourth Republic, the question of a vote of confidence was organized under the constitution, article 49. This was the sole prerogative of the President of the Council, after deliberation of the Council of Ministers. It provided that the government could only be overthrown by a majority of the members of the Assembly. The latter provision, intended to protect the government, instead proved devastating to it.

The rules of the National Assembly provided that a text attached to a vote of confidence would in normal circumstances be adopted, in other words if passed by a simple majority of votes. Therefore, deputies could, through many abstentions, ensure that a measure passed by a simple, but not an absolute, majority. The effect of this was that the measure did not pass and the government was put in the minority. However, due to the large number of abstentions, the government was not overturned under the constitution. Deprived of the support of the Assembly, from which it drew its legitimacy, and prevented from implementing its programs, it was nonetheless cornered, politically if not legally, into resignation. The Assembly avoided by this means, known as "calibrated majority", the dissolution of the legislature, which under the constitution was conditioned on the formal overthrow of the government.

In the 1946 constitution this measure was among those which contributed the most to the instability of government and the absence of clear policy in a particularly difficult context, marked until 1954 by the war in Indochina and later in Algeria. The regime was in crisis. While the need for reform was widely agreed upon, no concrete proposal emerged. The last and most radical was that of the government of Félix Gaillard, presented to the National Assembly on January 16, 1958. This notably included a re-writing of Article 49. The primary change was that there would be no further votes on motions of confidence, but only on one or more motions of censure which might be introduced in answer to it. Unless one of these motions of censure was adopted, the government measure would pass. The Gaillard measure was inspired as well by the German "constructive" motion of censure, requiring that motions of censure contain a counter-proposal and "suggest" the name of a new president of the Council.

It sought in this way to avoid a government being overturned by a divided opposition unable to agree on a different policy. On first reading the National Assembly adopted a watered-down version of the measure. Where the Gaillard measure provided that deputies would vote only on censure, they would under the Assembly version chose between confidence and censure, without the option of abstention. The Assembly version thus forced those who did not want to overturn the government to pass its text, even if they disapproved of it or did not wish it to pass. The original proposal allowed them to remain passive, and simply not vote for censure. Serious diplomatic setbacks related to Algeria led to the fall of the Gaillard administration on April 15, before the constitutional reform could be passed. After a long ministerial crisis and a brief intermission of Pierre Pflimlin as president of the Council, de Gaulle took power June 1 and his government was empowered to draw up a new constitution.

=== Adoption of 49.3 in 1958 ===
At the interministerial council which drafted the essence of the new constitution, Minister of State Pierre Pflimlin insisted on taking the Gaillard project back up, in particular the adoption without a vote of projects on which the government commits its responsibility, with only a motion of censure able to oppose it. Michel Debré thought the proposition unsuitable, and defended a complex system founded on the one hand on frequent and compulsory commitments of responsibility in the meaning of section 1, and on the other by a distinction between an exclusive area of competence for the parliament and another where the government could take measures by decree (a more supple distinction than that established by articles 34 and 37.

Given these conditions he felt that the exclusive domain of parliament did not include any topic on which a law project could have been urgent, and that therefore there would be no occasion for such a brutal procedure. De Gaulle on the other hand wished the president to be able to call a referendum on any legislation rejected by parliament. This desire was unacceptable to the ministers of State, who were attached to a strictly representative government and to whom a referendum recalled the plebiscites of the Bonapartes. They did not wish to see an appeal to the people used to debase parliament and control it.

Recourse to a referendum was thus very limited in Article 11 of the constitution. Pflimlin and his party, the MRP, imposed their solution: in the consultative constitutional committee, composed primarily of parliamentarians, examining the legislative project of the government, Pierre-Henri Teitgen subordinated the referendum to the adoption of the article. Despite the opposition of Paul Reynaud, an ardent defender of the prerogatives of parliament who chaired the consultative committee, and that of Michel Debré, de Gaulle, very concerned that the constitution be adopted, and furthermore seeing that his ideas on referendum would not be able to be accepted, rallied to the article.

The elements of the Gaillard proposal on the other hand disappeared, which would have had the executive proceed from the parliament, i.e. designation of a successor by a constructive motion of censure and the reference to investiture: the Gaillard proposal justified the adoption of the text by pointing out that lacking censure, the confidence given to the investiture was not withdrawn. De Gaulle did not want the government named or approved by parliament.

=== Procedure ===
Implementation of the article takes place in three stages. First, the deliberation of the Council of Ministers, in the same conditions as for the first paragraph. Next, a commitment of responsibility, strictly speaking, by the Prime Minister, in a session of the National Assembly. If applicable, the submission of a motion of censure, barely facilitated with respect to subparagraph 2 and its vote. In the case where there is no such motion, or it is not adopted, the text is considered adopted by the Assembly.

The deliberation in the Council of Ministers is carried out under the same conditions as under subparagraph 1, and one can discuss in the same manner the distinction between deliberation and authorization (see above).

If, outside of periods of cohabitation, the President, the real head of the executive branch, may informally have a great role in the decision to have recourse to 49.3, he has never opposed it in periods of cohabitation, which he could only do by refusing that the deliberation be recorded in the minutes of the Council of Ministers. Use of 49.3 is a strictly executive prerogative. Notably, just after his refusal to sign ordinances in 1986, a refusal whose constitutionality was the subject of a lively discussion, François Mitterrand allowed the Council of Ministers to authorize Jacques Chirac to commit the responsibility of the government to a law project that again took up the same provisions.

After deliberation of the Council, the prime minister is free, in a session of the National Assembly, to commit the responsibility of a government at a moment he judges opportune, and only if he judges it opportune. He must do this in person. He may do this as soon as the text is introduced, preventing all debate. More frequently, he allows debate to take place and perhaps the legislative text to be amended.

The rules of the Assembly allow the government to ask for an amendment to be held, in other words to push discussion back until a later time (Article95). If a commitment of responsibility takes place in the meantime, this discussion does not take place. The government can thus avoid amendments it does not favour, but which the Assembly may support, as well as those introduced with dilatory ends. When the commitment of responsibility is in effect committed, it is no longer possible to come back to measures previously adopted. However the text to which the government has committed may on the other hand take back up measures that had been pushed back.

It may also contain amendments to the original legislation, whether they were introduced by the executive or are amendments by the legislature which the administration has chosen to retain. The commitment of responsibility may also bear only on a part of the text, in which case discussion proceeds in the normal manner on the remaining articles.

Once the government commits to responsibility on a text, debate on it is definitively closed. A delay of twenty-four hours opens, for the introduction of a motion of censure. The only difference between such a motion of censure, said to be 'provoked', and a 'spontaneous' motion of censure under subparagraph 2 is that a provoked motion is not counted in the fixed limit to the number of motions that a deputy may sign in the course of a session, The other provisions of subparagraph 2, signature by a tenth of the members of the Assembly, delay before a vote, and adoption by an absolute majority of the Assembly members, all apply.

Usually, a motion of censure is introduced in response to government use of 49.3. If adopted, the motion entails the rejection of the law text and the resignation of the government. This has happened only once and 49.3 has proved very effective for the executive branch. However, only the National Assembly must pass the motion, not all of parliament. The liaison between the two assemblies provided in Article 45 of the constitution takes place in the usual fashion.

The executive frequently pledges its commitment multiple times to the same text, initially at first reading, then for the text produced by the commission that attempts to reconcile the versions adopted by the Senate and the Assembly, and lastly at the final reading, which would allow an override of any opposition in the Senate. The number of pledges of commitment may be higher on budget legislation, since the first part, concerning receipts and balancing the budget, must be adopted before any discussion of the detail in the line item allocations. This can lead, for a single reading of the law, to two commitments of responsibility. For example, Article 49.3 was used a total of five times when the 1990 budget was adopted.

=== History of 49.3 ===
The section 49.3 procedure has been used 115 times since 1958 by prime ministers. The "Months" columns are length of time the leader was in office.

Prime minister	Months	Uses	Uses per month	President
Michel Debré	40	4	0.10	Charles de Gaulle
Georges Pompidou	75	6	0.08	Charles de Gaulle
Maurice Couve de Murville	12	0	0	Charles de Gaulle
Jacques Chaban-Delmas	37	0	0	Georges Pompidou
Pierre Messmer	23	0	0	Georges Pompidou
Jacques Chirac	27	0	0	Valéry Giscard d'Estaing
Raymond Barre	57	8	0.14	Valéry Giscard d'Estaing
Pierre Mauroy	38	7	0.18	François Mitterrand
Laurent Fabius	21	4	0.19	François Mitterrand
Jacques Chirac	26	8	0.31	François Mitterrand
Michel Rocard	37	28	0.76	François Mitterrand
Édith Cresson	11	8	0.73	François Mitterrand
Pierre Bérégovoy	12	3	0.25	François Mitterrand
Édouard Balladur	26	3	0.12	François Mitterrand
Alain Juppé	25	2	0.08	Jacques Chirac
Lionel Jospin	60	0	0	Jacques Chirac
Jean-Pierre Raffarin	37	2	0.05	Jacques Chirac
Dominique de Villepin	24	1	0.04	Jacques Chirac
François Fillon	60	0	0	Nicolas Sarkozy
Jean-Marc Ayrault	23	0	0	François Hollande
Manuel Valls	33	6	0.18	François Hollande
Bernard Cazeneuve	6	0	0	François Hollande
Édouard Philippe	38	1	0.03	Emmanuel Macron
Jean Castex	23	0	0	Emmanuel Macron
Élisabeth Borne	20	23	1.15	Emmanuel Macron
Gabriel Attal	8	0	0	Emmanuel Macron
Michel Barnier	4	1	0.25	Emmanuel Macron
François Bayrou	9	4	2.25	Emmanuel Macron
Total	795	115	0.14	Emmanuel Macron

=== 49.3 in practice ===
Section 49.3 was conceived at a time when parliament was often divided into numerous undisciplined parties. This situation disappeared after the legislative elections of 1962. The new arrangement is more efficient, in that the legislators will prefer not to vote to force the resignation of the government even if they oppose the law in question, because they fear a form of political suicide in the eyes of the voters.

Various factors can bring the section into play:

- when a need arises to accelerate a debate which is dragging on too long in relation to the necessities of the government calendar or when the opposition is trying to block the debate process by multiplying indefinitely amendment proposals, when the government enjoys a real majority and there is no surprise possible. The government includes the amendments which it considers most serious and important and begins the procedure of 49.3.
- when part of the governing party opposes a law, preventing it from being voted. Resorting to section 49.3 enables the government to test the inner opposition, forcing it either to ally itself with the opposition to the government or to accept the law. Raymond Barre has used this procedure in such a situation eight times between 1976 and 1981 to fight against the permanent oppression from Jacques Chirac's RPR deputies, who each time accepted the enforcement of the law instead of allying with François Mitterrand's Parti socialiste;
- when the government is only supported by a plurality in the National Assembly (that is it has the support of the largest group in the Assembly, but less than an overall majority). Michel Rocard used the procedure 28 times to make his legislation pass, because he was permanently torn apart between the French Communist Party, the center-right Union du Centre (separated from the Union for French Democracy), and deputies faithful to President François Mitterrand. Édith Cresson, who succeeded him, used it eight times, even though she benefited from greater support from Mitterrandist deputies.

Since 1958, the practice has been used over 90 times. It has been used for diverse texts with no preference for any subject. The texts are still examined by the Constitutional council and by the Senate. The article 49.3 is used for a more efficient and direct approach to an issue if any of the factors above arise.

=== Critiques ===
Traditionally, the article 49.3 is usually contested by members of opposing parties to the executive. Some politicians see the article as against democracy and democratic debate. Francois Hollande, then not yet president, in February 2006 describes it as a “brutality” and as a “blocage to democracy”. Martine Aubry describes it as “against democratic debate”. Manuel Valls, then prime minister to Francois Hollande, describes it as having perverse effects. This did not prevent them from using it more than anyone in the last 20 years.

The biggest critiques to the article 49.3 was relative to the balance between the executive and legislative branch. However, these critiques are to be nuanced as the voice of the deputies can still be heard through the vote of no confidence. Indeed, if the vote of no confidence is adopted, the executive will most likely dissolve the assembly and thus give the citizens their voice on the matter through elections for deputies.

A critique of this article is also on the motives behind its usage and its variety of reasons behind its usage. Indeed, some academicians argue that for the article 49.3 to be conformed to the article 24.1 of the constitution on general will, the reasons behind the 49.3 should be restricted to certain areas of effect. This would be done in order to restrain abusive use of this article and make sure that the political motives behind its use are necessary. These motives would be judged by the Constitutional Council. The issue would be if the motives are not sufficiently declared and clear and would lead to a subjective view of the bill.

== Statement of general policy (49.4) ==
The Prime Minister may ask the Senate to approve a statement of general policy. Unlike in a vote of confidence, statements of general policy do not engage the responsibility of the government.

== Bibliography ==
- Maus, Didier. Les grands textes de la pratique constitutionnelle de la V^{e} République. La documentation française, (The Major Texts of Constitutional Practice in the Fifth Republic: French Documentation) Paris, 1998. ISBN 2-11-003925-6
- Chevalier, Jean-Jacques et al. La Ve République 1958–2004. Histoire des institutions et des régimes politiques de la France. (The Fifth Republic 1958-2004: History of French Institutions and Political Régimes) Dalloz, Paris, 2004. ISBN 2-247-05578-8
- Monin, Marcel. Texte et documents constitutionnels depuis 1958. Analyse et commentaires. (Text and Constitutional Documents since 1958: Analysis and Commentaries), Dalloz, Paris, 2004. ISBN 2-247-04618-5

== Notes and references ==
This article was originally translated from the French Wikipedia article, fr:Article 49 de la Constitution de la cinquième République française.

Notes

Citations
