= Olivier Klein =

French politician (born 1967)

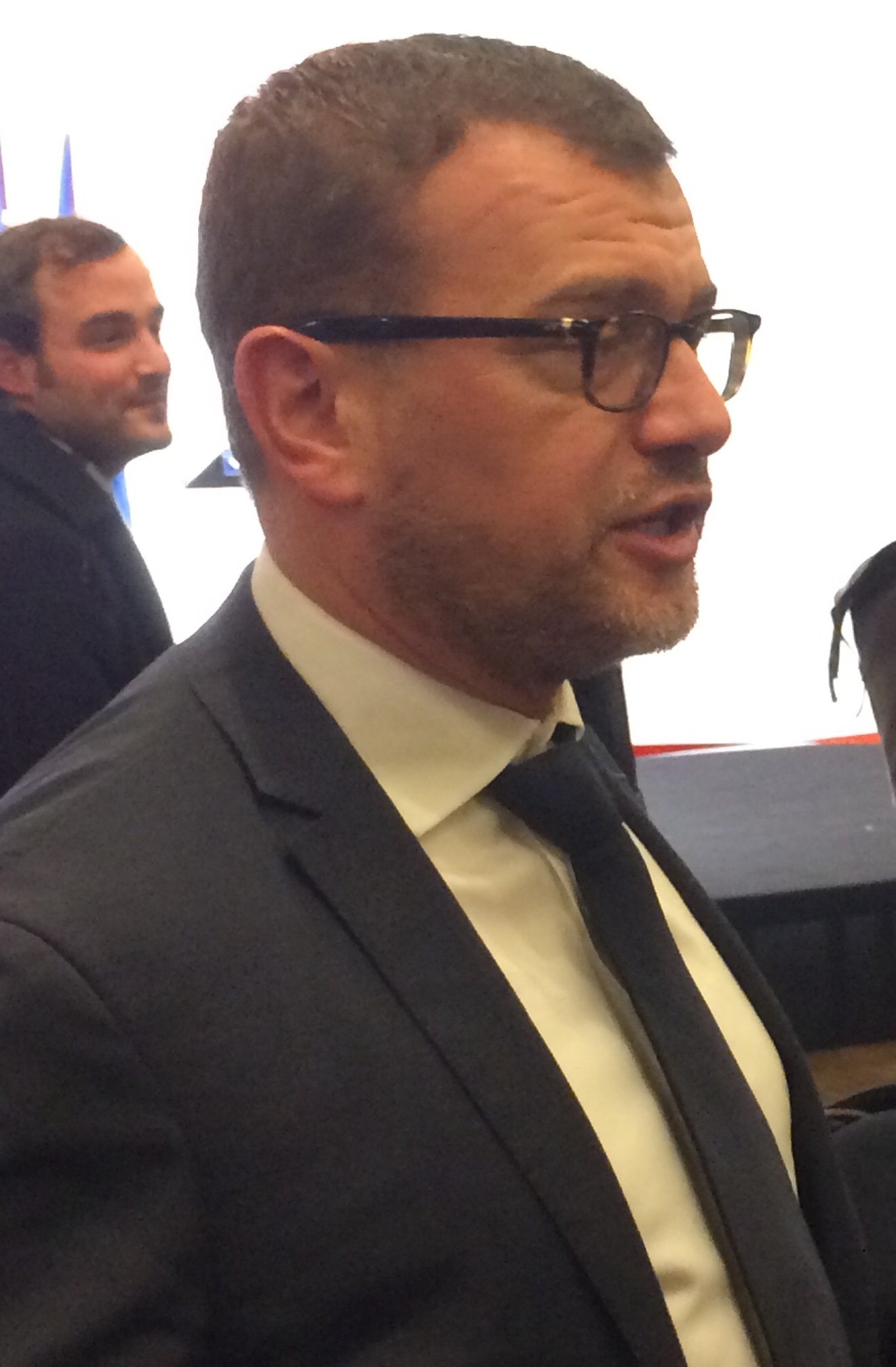
- Olivier Klein in 2023

Minister Delegate to the City and Housing
- In office 4 July 2022 – 20 July 2023
- President: Emmanuel Macron
- Prime Minister: Élisabeth Borne
- Preceded by: Emmanuelle Wargon

Mayor of Clichy-sous-Bois
- In office 19 October 2011 – 3 December 2022
- Preceded by: Claude Dilain

Personal details
- Born: 16 February 1967 (age 59) France
- Party: PCF (jusqu'en 2006); PS (2006-2020); FP (Depuis 2020)

Olivier Klein (born 16 February 1967) is a French politician who served as Minister Delegate of Cities and Housing in the government of Prime Minister Élisabeth Borne from 2022 to 2023.

== Political career ==
Klein joined the Socialist Party (PS) in 2006.

He served as mayor of Clichy-sous-Bois from 2011 to 2022.

In 2017, Klein was appointed as president of the National Agency for Urban Renewal (ANRU).

Ahead of the 2022 presidential elections, Klein endorsed incumbent President Emmanuel Macron.

== See also ==
- Borne government
