= Emmanuel Macron =

President of France since 2017

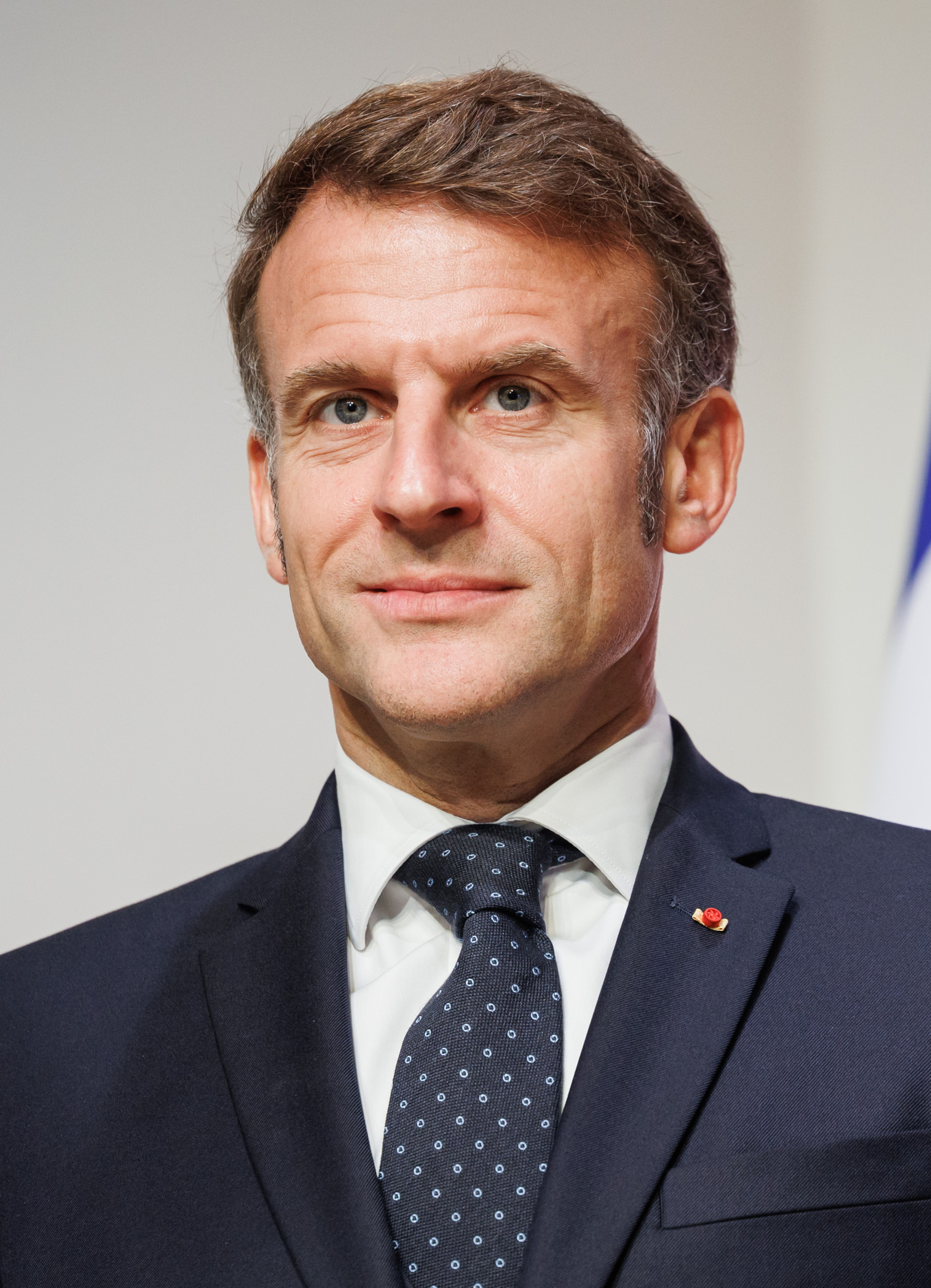
- Macron in 2025

President of France
- Incumbent
- Assumed office 14 May 2017
- Prime Minister: See list: Édouard Philippe; Jean Castex; Élisabeth Borne; Gabriel Attal; Michel Barnier; François Bayrou; Sébastien Lecornu
- Preceded by: François Hollande

Minister of Economics and Finance
- In office 26 August 2014 – 30 August 2016
- Prime Minister: Manuel Valls
- Preceded by: Arnaud Montebourg
- Succeeded by: Michel Sapin

Deputy Secretary-General to the President
- In office 15 May 2012 – 15 July 2014
- President: François Hollande
- Preceded by: Jean Castex
- Succeeded by: Boris Vallaud

Personal details
- Born: Emmanuel Jean-Michel Frédéric Macron; 21 December 1977 (age 48) Amiens, France
- Party: Renaissance (since 2016)
- Other political affiliations: Socialist (2006–2009); Independent (2009–2016)
- Spouse: Brigitte Trogneux (m. 2007)
- Parent: Jean-Michel Macron (father)
- Relatives: Laurence Auzière-Jourdan (stepdaughter)
- Education: Paris X Nanterre (MAS); Sciences Po (MPA); École nationale d'administration

Co-Prince of Andorra (Note: Ex officio Co-Prince)
- Reign: 14 May 2017 – present
- Predecessor: François Hollande
- Co-Prince: Joan Enric Vives i Sicília (until 2025); Josep-Lluís Serrano Pentinat (since 2025)
- Emmanuel Macron's voice Macron speaking to attendees of the 43rd Antarctic Treaty Consultative Meeting; Recorded 24 June 2021

Emmanuel Jean-Michel Frédéric Macron (Note: US: /ɪˈmænju.ɛl məkˈroʊn/; French: [emanɥɛl makʁɔ̃]) (born 21 December 1977) is a French politician who has served as President of France since 2017. He has been a member of Renaissance since founding the party in 2016. Macron previously served as Deputy Secretary-General to the President from 2012 to 2014 and Minister of Economics and Finance from 2014 to 2016 under President François Hollande.

Born in Amiens, Macron studied philosophy at Paris Nanterre University. He completed a master's degree in public affairs at Sciences Po and graduated from the École nationale d'administration in 2004. He worked as a senior civil servant at the General Inspectorate of Finance and as an investment banker at Rothschild & Co. Macron was a senior adviser to President Hollande, being appointed as Élysée deputy secretary-general by Hollande after the 2012 presidential election. He was later appointed as Economics Minister in 2014 in the second Valls government, and led several business-friendly reforms. He resigned in 2016 to launch his 2017 presidential campaign. A member of the Socialist Party between 2006 and 2009, he ran in the election under the banner of En Marche, a centrist and pro-European political movement which he founded in 2016.

Partly due to the Fillon affair, Macron was elected president in May 2017 with 66% of the second-round vote, defeating Marine Le Pen of the National Front. Aged 39, he became the youngest president in French history. In the 2017 legislative election, his party, renamed La République En Marche! (LREM), secured a majority in the National Assembly. During his presidency, Macron has overseen reforms to labour laws, taxation, and pensions; and pursued a renewable energy transition. Dubbed "president of the rich" by opponents, increasing protests against his reforms culminated in 2018–2020 with the yellow vests protests and the pension reform strike. From 2020, he led France's response to the COVID-19 pandemic and subsequent recession, including by overseeing the country's vaccination rollout. In foreign policy, Macron called for reforms to the European Union (EU) and signed treaties with Germany and Italy. He conducted €40 billion in trade and business agreements with China during the China–United States trade war and oversaw a dispute with Australia and the US over the AUKUS security pact. Macron has also continued Opération Chammal in the war against the Islamic State and joined in the international condemnation of the Russian invasion of Ukraine.

Macron was elected to a second term in the 2022 presidential election, again defeating Le Pen and becoming the first French presidential candidate to win reelection since Jacques Chirac in 2002. In the 2022 legislative election, Macron's centrist coalition lost its majority, resulting in a hung parliament and formation of France's first minority government since 1993. In 2023, the government of his prime minister, Élisabeth Borne, passed legislation raising the retirement age from 62 to 64; this led to public sector strikes and violent protests. In 2024, Macron appointed Gabriel Attal as prime minister after a government crisis. He then dissolved the National Assembly and called a snap legislative election following overwhelming defeat at the 2024 European Parliament elections, which resulted in another hung parliament and an electoral defeat for his coalition. Afterwards, Macron appointed Michel Barnier, a conservative and former chief Brexit negotiator, as prime minister. Three months in, Barnier was toppled by a historic vote of no confidence, prompting Macron to replace him with centrist veteran François Bayrou. After Bayrou was himself brought down by a confidence vote in September 2025, Macron appointed Sébastien Lecornu, Minister of the Armed Forces, as prime minister. Lecornu resigned less than a month later following political backlash over the composition of his government, but was reappointed by Macron shortly afterwards. The formations of these short-lived governments marked a political crisis.

== Early life ==
Emmanuel Jean-Michel Frédéric Macron was born on 21 December 1977 in Amiens. He is the son of Françoise Macron (née Noguès), a physician, and Jean-Michel Macron, professor of neurology at the University of Picardy. The couple divorced in 2010. He has two siblings, Laurent, born in 1979, and Estelle, born in 1982. Françoise and Jean-Michel's first child was stillborn.

The Macron family legacy is traced back to the village of Authie, Picardy. One of his paternal great-grandfathers, George William Robertson, was English, and was born in Bristol, United Kingdom. His maternal grandparents, Jean and Germaine Noguès (née Arribet), are from the Pyrenean town of Bagnères-de-Bigorre, Gascony. He commonly visited Bagnères-de-Bigorre to visit his grandmother Germaine, whom he called "Manette". Macron associates his enjoyment of reading and his leftward political leanings to Germaine, who, after coming from a modest upbringing of a stationmaster father and a housekeeping mother, became a teacher and then a principal.

Although raised in a non-religious family, Macron was baptised a Catholic at his own request at age 12; he is agnostic today. His parents chose his name in reference to the biblical prophecy of Jesus Christ, Emmanuel.

Macron was educated mainly at the Jesuit institute Lycée la Providence in Amiens before his parents sent him to finish his last year of school at the elite Lycée Henri-IV in Paris, where he completed the high school curriculum and the undergraduate program with a "Bac S, Mention Très bien". At the same time, he was nominated for the "Concours général" (most selective national level high school competition) in French literature and received his diploma for his piano studies at Amiens Conservatory. His parents sent him to Paris due to their alarm at the bond he had formed with Brigitte Auzière, a married teacher with three children at Jésuites de la Providence, who later became his wife.

In Paris, Macron twice failed to gain entry to the École normale supérieure. He instead studied philosophy at the University of Paris-Ouest Nanterre La Défense, obtaining a DEA degree (a master level degree), with a thesis on Machiavelli and Hegel. Around 1999 Macron worked as an editorial assistant to Paul Ricoeur, the French Protestant philosopher who was then writing his last major work, La Mémoire, l'Histoire, l'Oubli. Macron worked mainly on the notes and bibliography. Macron became a member of the editorial board of the literary magazine Esprit.

Macron did not perform national service because he was pursuing his graduate studies. Born in December 1977, he belonged to the last cohort for whom military service was mandatory.

Macron obtained a master's degree in public affairs at Sciences Po, majoring in "Public Guidance and Economy" before training for a senior civil service career at the selective École nationale d'administration (ENA), training at the French Embassy in Nigeria and at the prefecture of Oise before graduating in 2004.

== Professional career ==
=== Inspector of Finances ===
After graduating from ENA in 2004, Macron became an Inspector in the Inspection générale des finances (IGF), a branch of the Finance Ministry. Macron was mentored by Jean-Pierre Jouyet, the then-head of the IGF. During his time as an Inspector of Finances, Macron gave lectures during the summer at the "prep'ENA" (a special cram school for the ENA entrance examination) at IPESUP, an elite private school specializing in preparation for the entrance examinations of the Grandes écoles, such as HEC or Sciences Po.

In 2006, Laurence Parisot offered him the job of managing director for Mouvement des Entreprises de France, the largest employer federation in France, but he declined.

In August 2007, Macron was appointed deputy rapporteur for Jacques Attali's "Commission to Unleash French Growth". In 2008, Macron paid €50,000 to buy himself out of his government contract. He then became an investment banker in a highly-paid position at Rothschild & Cie Banque. In March 2010, he was appointed to the Attali Commission as a member.

=== Investment banker ===
In September 2008, Macron left his job as an Inspector of Finances and took a position at Rothschild & Cie Banque. Macron left the government when Nicolas Sarkozy became president. He was originally offered the job by François Henrot. His first responsibility at the bank was assisting with the acquisition of Cofidis by Crédit Mutuel Nord Europe.

Macron formed a relationship with Alain Minc, a businessman on the supervisory board of Le Monde. In 2010, Macron was promoted to partner with the bank after working on the recapitalization of Le Monde and the acquisition by Atos of Siemens IT Solutions and Services. In the same year, Macron was put in charge of Nestlé's acquisition of Pfizer's infant nutrition division for €9 billion, which made him a millionaire.

In February 2012, Macron advised businessman Philippe Tillous-Borde, the CEO of the Avril Group.

Macron reported that he had earned €2 million between December 2010 and May 2012. Official documents show that between 2009 and 2013, Macron had earned almost €3 million. He left Rothschild & Cie in 2012.

== Early political career ==
In his youth beginning in 1998, Macron worked for the Citizens' Movement for two years, but he never applied to be a member. Macron was an assistant for Mayor Georges Sarre of the 11th arrondissement of Paris during his time at Sciences Po. Macron joined the Socialist Party at the age of 24, but last renewed his membership for the period 2006–2009.

Macron met François Hollande through Jean-Pierre Jouyet in 2006 and joined his staff in 2010. In 2007, Macron attempted to run for a seat in the National Assembly in Picardy under the Socialist Party label in the 2007 legislative elections; however, his application was declined. Macron was offered the chance to be the deputy chief of staff to Prime Minister François Fillon in 2010, though he declined.

=== Deputy Secretary-General of the Élysée (2012–2014) ===
On 15 May 2012, Macron became the deputy secretary-general of the Élysée, a senior role in President François Hollande's staff. Macron served with Nicolas Revel. He served under the secretary-general, Pierre-René Lemas.

During the summer of 2012, Macron put forward a proposal that would increase the 35-hour work week to 37 hours until 2014. He also tried to hold back the large tax increases on the highest earners that were planned by the government. Hollande refused Macron's proposals. In 2013, his was one of the deciding votes against regulating the salaries of CEOs. Nicolas Revel, the other deputy secretary-general of the Élysée opposed Macron on a proposed budget responsibility pact favoured by the Medef.

On 10 June 2014, it was announced that Macron had resigned from his role and was replaced by Laurence Boone. Reasons given for his departure included his disappointment at not being included in the first Government of Manuel Valls and his frustration with his lack of influence on the reforms proposed by the government. This was following the appointment of Jean-Pierre Jouyet as chief of staff.

Jouyet said that Macron left to "continue personal aspirations" and create his own financial consultancy firm. It was later reported that he was planning to create an investment firm that would attempt to fund educational projects. Shortly afterwards he was hired as a research fellow at the University of Berlin with the help of businessman Alain Minc. He had also sought a position at Harvard University.

Offered a chance to be a candidate in the municipal elections in 2014 in his hometown of Amiens, Macron declined, leading François Hollande to reject Manuel Valls's idea of appointing him Budget Minister, as he had never been elected to public office.

=== Minister of Economics and Finance (2014–2017) ===
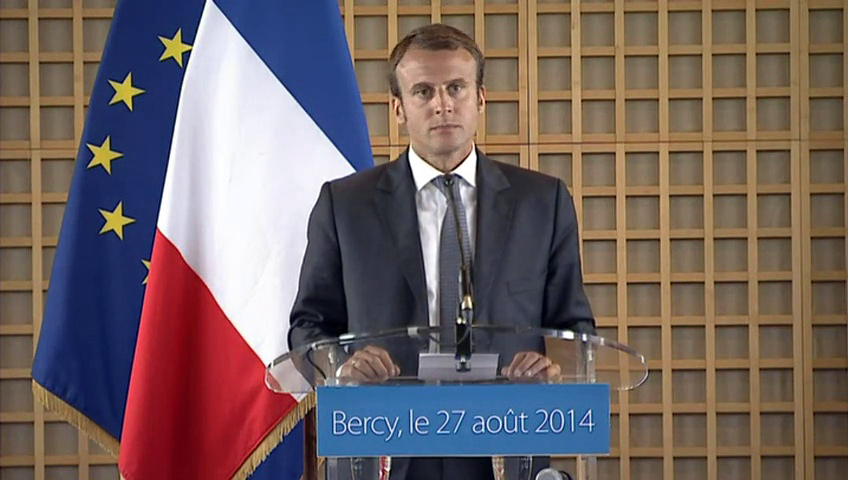
Macron as the Minister of Economics and Finance, 2014

He was appointed as the Minister of Economics and Finance in the Second Valls government on 26 August 2014, replacing Arnaud Montebourg. He was the youngest Minister of Economics since Valéry Giscard d'Estaing in 1962. Macron was branded by the media as the "Anti-Montebourg" due to being pro-EU and much more liberal, while Montebourg was eurosceptic and left-wing. As Minister of Economics, Macron was at the forefront of pushing through business-friendly reforms. On 17 February 2015, prime minister Manuel Valls pushed Macron's signature law package through a reluctant parliament using the special 49.3 procedure.

Macron increased the French share in the company Renault from 15% to 20% and then enforced the Florange law which grants double voting rights on shares registered for more than two years unless two-thirds of shareholders vote to overturn it. This gave the French state a minority share in the company though Macron later stated that the government would limit its powers within Renault.

Macron was widely criticized for being unable to prevent the closing down of an Ecopla factory in Isère.

In August 2015, Macron said that he was no longer a member of the Socialist Party and was an independent.

==== Macron Law ====
A law which had originally been sponsored by Arnaud Montebourg before he left the government, and which had focused on "purchasing power", grew into the Macron law, a grab bag of measures liberalizing laws prohibiting work on Sunday and at night; restrictions on coaches for public transportation; regulations for debt collectors, barristers and auctioneers; and rules governing the rental of equipment by the military from private companies. The law also sought to simplify many government procedures, such as that for obtaining a driving licence. Manuel Valls, fearing that it would not pass in the National Assembly, decided to push the law through with the 49.3 procedure and so it was adopted on 10 April 2015.

Estimates of the increase in GDP the law might generate ranged from 0.3% to 0.5%.

=== 2017 presidential campaign ===
==== Formation of En Marche and resignation from government ====
Macron first became known to the French public after his appearance on the French TV programme Des Paroles Et Des Actes in March 2015. Before forming his political party En Marche!, he gave a number of speeches, his first one in March 2015 in Val-de-Marne. He threatened to leave Manuel Valls' second government over the proposed removal of dual-nationality from terrorists. He also took various foreign trips, including one to Israel where he spoke on the advancement of digital technology.

Tensions around the question of Macron's loyalty to the Valls government and Hollande increased when they turned down a bill he put forward dubbed "Macron 2", which had a larger scope than his original law. Macron was given the chance to help draft into the El Khomri law and put specific parts of "Macron 2" into the law though El Khomri was able to overturn these with the help of other ministers.

Amid tensions and deterioration of relations with the current government, Macron founded an independent political party, En Marche, in Amiens on 6 April 2016. A social-liberal, progressive political movement that gathered huge media coverage when it was first established, the party and Macron were both reprimanded by President Hollande and the question of Macron's loyalty to the government was raised. Several MEPs spoke out in support for the movement though the majority of the Socialist Party spoke against En Marche including Manuel Valls, Michel Sapin, Axelle Lemaire and Christian Eckert.

In June 2016, support for Macron and his movement, En Marche, began to grow in the media with Libération reporting that L'Express, Les Échos, Le 1, and L'Opinion had begun to support him. Following several controversies surrounding trade unionists and their protests, Acrimed reported that major newspapers began to run front-page stories about Macron and En Marche. Criticized by both the far-left and the far-right, these pro-Macron influencers in the press were dubbed "Macronites".

In May 2016, Orleans mayor Olivier Carré invited Macron to the festival commemorating the 587th anniversary of Joan of Arc's efforts during the Siege of Orléans. LCI reported that Macron was trying to take back the symbol of Joan of Arc from the far-right. Macron later went to Puy du Fou and declared he was "not a socialist" in a speech amid rumours he was going to leave the current government. On 30 August 2016, Macron resigned from the government ahead of the 2017 presidential election, to devote himself to his En Marche movement. There had been rising tensions and several reports that he had wanted to leave the Valls government since early 2015. He initially planned to leave after the cancellation of his "Macron 2" law but decided to stay on temporarily after a meeting with President François Hollande. Michel Sapin was announced as Macron's replacement, while Hollande said he felt Macron had "methodically betrayed" him. An IFOP poll showed that 84% of those surveyed agreed with his decision to resign.

==== First round of the presidential election ====
Macron first showed his intention to run by forming En Marche, but following his resignation from the government, he was able to dedicate more time to his movement. He first announced that he was considering running for president in April 2016, and after his resignation from the position of economy minister, media sources began to identify patterns in his fundraising indicating he would run. In October 2016, Macron criticized Hollande's goal of being a "normal" president, saying that France needed a more "Jupiterian presidency".

On 16 November 2016, Macron formally declared his candidacy for the French presidency after months of speculation. In his announcement speech, he called for a "democratic revolution" and promised to "unblock France". He had expressed hope that Hollande would run several months earlier, saying that—as the sitting president—he was the legitimate Socialist party candidate. Macron's book Révolution was published on 24 November 2016 and reached fifth position on the French best-seller list in December 2016.

Shortly after announcing his run, Jean-Christophe Cambadélis and Manuel Valls both asked Macron to run in the Socialist Party presidential primary, which he ultimately refused to do. Jean-Christophe Cambadélis began to threaten to exclude members who associated or supported Macron following Lyon mayor Gérard Collomb throwing his support behind him.

Macron's campaign, headed by French economist Sophie Ferracci, announced in December 2016 that it had raised 3.7 million euros in donations, three times the budget of then-front runner Alain Juppé. Macron came under criticism from several individuals, including Benoît Hamon−who requested he reveal a list of his donors and accused him of conflicts of interest due to the time he spent at Rothschilds, which Macron dismissed as "demagogy". Journalists Marion L'Hour and Frédéric Says later reported that he had spent €120,000 on setting up dinners and meetings with various personalities within the media and in French popular culture while at Bercy. Christian Jacob and Philippe Vigier accused him of using this money to campaign without campaigning. His successor, Michel Sapin, saw nothing illegal about his actions, saying that he had the right to spend the funds. Macron called the allegations "defamatory" and said that none of the ministerial budget had been spent on his party.

Macron's campaign enjoyed considerable coverage from the media. Mediapart reported that over fifty magazine covers were dedicated purely to him. Friends with the owners of Le Monde and Claude Perdiel, the former owner of Nouvel Observateur, he was labelled the "media candidate" by the far-left and far-right and was viewed as such in opinion polls. Many observers compared his campaign to a product being sold due to Maurice Lévy, a former Publicis CEO, using marketing tactics to try to advance his presidential ambitions. The magazine Marianne reported that BFM TV, owned by Patrick Drahi, broadcast more coverage of Macron than of all the other main candidates combined. Marianne speculated that this might be due to the campaigns links with Drahi through Bernard Mourad.

François Bayrou, with whom Macron had been compared, announced he was not going to stand in the presidential election and instead formed an electoral alliance with Macron, whose poll ratings began to rise. After several legal issues surrounding François Fillon were publicized, Macron overtook him in the polls to become the front-runner.

Macron attracted criticism for the time taken to spell out a formal program during his campaign; despite declaring in November that he had still not released a complete set of proposals by February, attracting both attacks from critics and concern among allies and supporters. He eventually laid out his 150-page formal program on 2 March, publishing it online and discussing it at a marathon press conference that day.

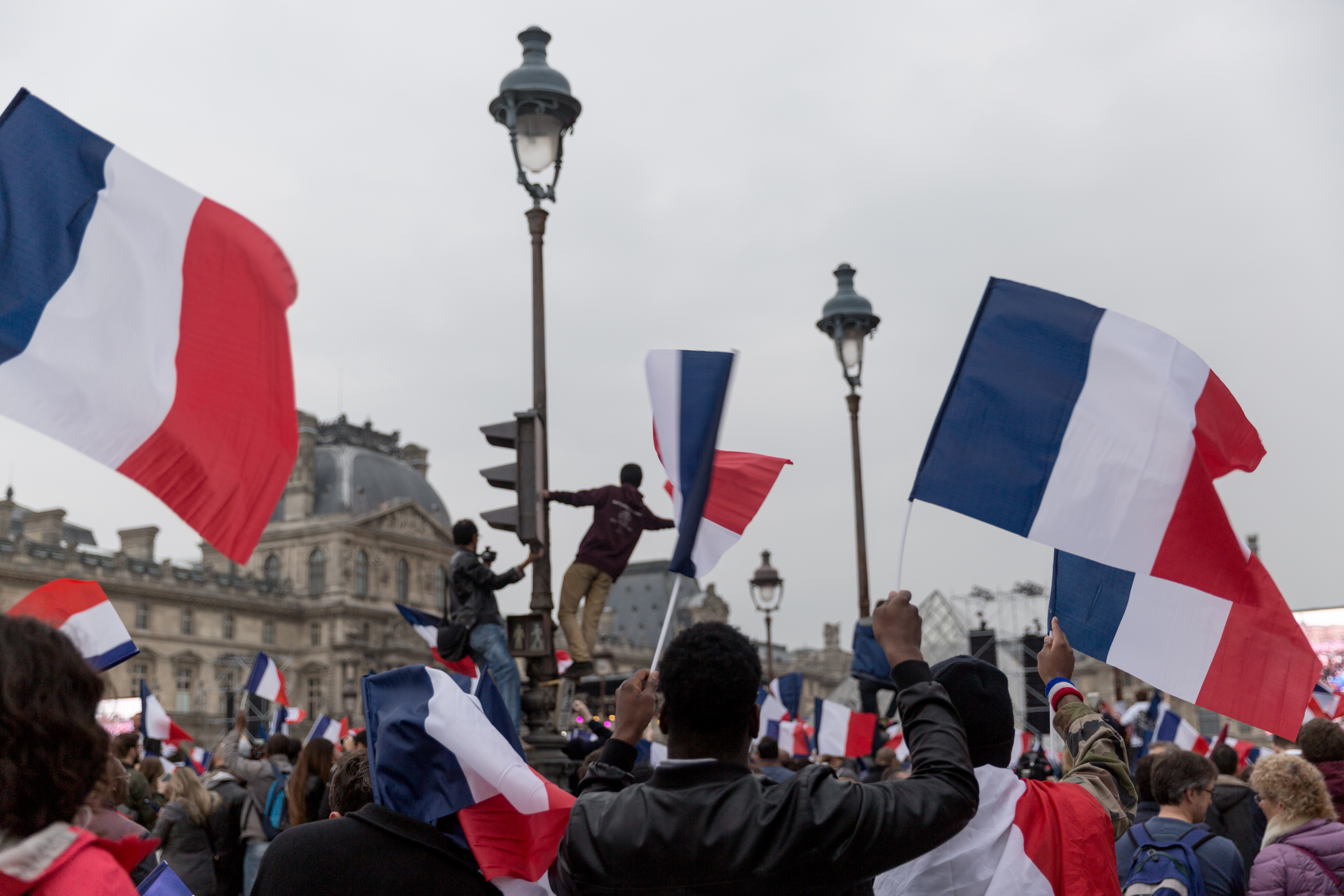
Macron's supporters celebrating his victory at the Louvre on 7 May 2017

Macron accumulated a wide array of supporters, securing endorsements from François Bayrou of the Democratic Movement (MoDem), MEP Daniel Cohn-Bendit, the ecologist candidate François de Rugy of the primary of the left, and Socialist MP Richard Ferrand, secretary-general of En Marche, as well as numerous others – many of them from the Socialist Party, but also a significant number of centrist and centre-right politicians. The Grand Mosque of Paris urged French Muslims to vote en masse for Macron.

On 23 April 2017, Macron received the most votes in the first round of the presidential election, with more than 8 million votes (24%) and faced Marine Le Pen in the second round, with the support of former candidates François Fillon and Benoît Hamon and the sitting president François Hollande.

==== Second round of the presidential election ====
Many foreign politicians supported Macron in his bid against right-wing populist candidate Marine Le Pen, including European Commission President Jean-Claude Juncker, German Chancellor Angela Merkel, and former US President Barack Obama.

A debate was arranged between Macron and Le Pen on 3 May 2017. The debate lasted for two hours and opinion polls showed that he was perceived to have won.

In March 2017, Macron's digital campaign manager, Mounir Mahjoubi, told Britain's Sky News that Russia is behind "high level attacks" on Macron, and said that its state media are "the first source of false information". He said: "We are accusing RT (formerly known as Russia Today) and Sputnik News (of being) the first source of false information shared about our candidate ...".

Two days before the French presidential election on 7 May, it was reported that nine gigabytes of Macron's campaign emails had been anonymously posted to Pastebin, a document-sharing site. These documents were then spread onto the imageboard 4chan, which led to the hashtag "#macronleaks" trending on Twitter. In a statement the same evening, Macron's political movement, En Marche, said: "The En Marche movement has been the victim of a massive and coordinated hack this evening which has given rise to the diffusion on social media of various internal information". Macron's campaign had previously been presented a report in March 2017 by the Japanese cyber security firm Trend Micro detailing how En Marche had been the target of phishing attacks. Trend Micro said that the group conducting these attacks was the Russian hacking group Fancy Bear, also accused of hacking the Democratic National Committee on 22 July 2016. 21,075 verified emails and another 50,773 emails it could not verify were released in July 2017 by WikiLeaks. This followed Le Pen accusing Macron of tax avoidance.

On 7 May 2017, Macron was elected President of France with 66.1% of the vote to Marine Le Pen's 33.9%. The election had record abstention at 25.4%, and 8% of ballots were blank or spoiled. Macron resigned from his role as president of En Marche and Catherine Barbaroux became interim leader.

== Presidency (2017–present) ==
=== First term (2017–2022) ===
Macron formally became president on 14 May. At 39, he became the youngest president in French history and the youngest French head of state since Napoleon. He is also the first president of France born after the establishment of the Fifth Republic in 1958.

He appointed Patrick Strzoda as his chief of staff and Ismaël Emelien as his special advisor for strategy, communication and speeches. On 15 May, he appointed Édouard Philippe of the Republicans as Prime Minister. On the same day, he made his first official foreign visit, meeting in Berlin with Angela Merkel, the Chancellor of Germany. The two leaders emphasised the importance of France–Germany relations to the European Union. They agreed to draw up a "common road map" for Europe, insisting that neither was against changes to the Treaties of the European Union.

In the 2017 legislative election, Macron's party La République En Marche and its Democratic Movement allies secured a comfortable majority, winning 350 seats out of 577. After the Republicans emerged as the winners of the Senate elections, government spokesman Christophe Castaner stated the elections were a "failure" for his party.

On 3 July 2020, Macron appointed the centre-right Jean Castex as the Prime Minister of France. Castex, described as a social conservative, was a member of the Republicans. The appointment was described as "doubling down on a course that is widely seen as centre-right in economic terms".

==== Domestic policy ====
In his first few months as president, Macron pressed for the enactment of a package of reforms on public ethics, labour laws, taxes, and law enforcement agency powers.

==== Anti-corruption ====
In response to Penelopegate, the National Assembly passed a part of Macron's proposed law to stop mass corruption in French politics by July 2017, banning elected representatives from hiring family members. Meanwhile, the second part of the law scrapping a constituency fund was scheduled for voting after Senate objections.

Macron's plan to give his wife an official role within government came under fire with criticisms ranging from its being undemocratic to what critics perceive as a contradiction to his fight against nepotism. Following an online petition of nearly 290,000 signatures on change.org Macron abandoned the plan. On 9 August, the National Assembly adopted the bill on public ethics, a key theme of Macron's campaign, after debates on the scrapping the constituency funds.

==== Labour policy and unions ====
Macron aims to shift union-management relations away from the adversarial lines of the current French system and toward a more flexible, consensus-driven system modelled after Germany and Scandinavia. He has also pledged to act against companies employing cheaper labour from eastern Europe and in return affecting jobs of French workers, what he has termed as "social dumping". Under the Posted Workers Directive 1996, eastern European workers can be employed for a limited time at the salary level in eastern European countries, which has led to dispute between the EU states.

The French government announced the proposed changes to France's labour rules ("Code du Travail"), being among the first steps taken by Macron and his government to galvanize the French economy. Macron's reform efforts have encountered resistance from some French trade unions. The largest trade union, the CFDT, has taken a conciliatory approach to Macron's push and has engaged in negotiations with the president, while the more militant CGT is more hostile to reforms. Macron's labour minister, Muriel Pénicaud, is overseeing the effort.

The National Assembly, including the Senate approved the proposal, allowing the government to loosen the labour laws after negotiations with unions and employers' groups. The reforms, which were discussed with unions, limit payouts for dismissals deemed unfair and give companies greater freedom to hire and fire employees as well as to define acceptable working conditions. The president signed five decrees reforming the labour rules on 22 September. Government figures released in October 2017 revealed that during the legislative push to reform the labour code, the unemployment rate had dropped 1.8%, the biggest since 2001.

===== Migrant crisis =====
Speaking on refugees and, specifically, the Calais Jungle, Macron said on 16 January 2018 that he would not allow another refugee camp to form in Paris before outlining the government policy towards immigration and asylum. He has also announced plans to speed up asylum applications and deportations but give refugees better housing.

On 23 June 2018, President Macron said: "The reality is that Europe is not experiencing a migration crisis of the same magnitude as the one it experienced in 2015", "a country like Italy has not at all the same migratory pressure as last year. The crisis we are experiencing today in Europe is a political crisis". In November 2019, Macron introduced new immigration rules to restrict the number of refugees reaching France, while stating to "take back control" of the immigration policy.

In 2022, the total number of new foreigners coming to France rose above 320,000 for the first time, with nearly a majority coming from Africa.

===== Economic policy =====
Pierre de Villiers, then-Chief of the General Staff of the Armies, stepped down on 19 July 2017 following a confrontation with Macron. De Villiers cited the military budget cut of €850 million as the main reason he was stepping down. Le Monde later reported that De Villiers told a parliamentary group, "I will not let myself be fucked like this." Macron named François Lecointre as De Villiers' replacement.

Macron's government presented its first budget on 27 September, the terms of which reduced taxes as well as spending to bring the public deficit in line with the EU's fiscal rules. The budget replaced the wealth tax with one targeting real estate, fulfilling Macron's campaign pledge to scrap the wealth tax. Before it was replaced, the tax collected up to 1.5% of the wealth of French residents whose global worth exceeded €1.3m.

In February 2018, Macron announced a plan to offer voluntary redundancy in an attempt to further cut jobs from the French civil service.

In December 2019, Macron announced that he would scrap the 20th-century pension system and introduce a single national pension system managed by the state. In January 2020, after weeks of public transport shutdown and vandalism across Paris against the new pension plan, Macron compromised on the plan by revising the retirement age. In February, the pension overhaul was adopted by decree using Article 49 of the French constitution. However, on 16 March 2020, Macron announced that the draft legislation would be pulled as France went into lockdown to slow the spread of COVID-19.

===== Terrorism =====
In July 2017, the Senate approved its first reading of a controversial bill with stricter anti-terror laws, a campaign pledge of Macron. The National Assembly voted on 3 October to pass bill 415–127, with 19 abstentions. Interior Minister Gérard Collomb described France as being "still in a state of war" ahead of the vote, with the 1 October Marseille stabbing having taken place two days prior. The Senate then passed the bill on its second reading by a 244–22 margin on 18 October. Later that day Macron stated that 13 terror plots had been foiled since early 2017. The law replaced the state of emergency in France and made some of its provisions permanent.

The bill was criticized by human rights advocates. A public poll by Le Figaro showed 57% of the respondents approved of it even though 62% thought it would encroach on personal freedoms.

The law gives authorities expanded power to search homes, restrict movement, close places of worship, and search areas around train stations and international ports and airports. It was passed after modifications to address concerns about civil liberties. The most punitive measures will be reviewed annually and were scheduled to lapse by the end of 2020. The bill was signed into law by Macron on 30 October 2017. He announced that starting 1 November, it would bring an end to the state of emergency.

===== Civil rights =====
Visiting Corsica in February 2018, Macron sparked controversy when he rejected Corsican nationalist wishes for Corsican as an official language but offered to recognize Corsica in the French constitution.

Macron also proposed a plan to "reorganise" the Islamic religion in France saying: "We are working on the structuring of Islam in France and also on how to explain it, which is extremely important – my goal is to rediscover what lies at the heart of laïcité, the possibility of being able to believe as not to believe, in order to preserve national cohesion and the possibility of having freedom of conscience." He declined to reveal further information about the plan.

===== Foreign policy and national defence =====
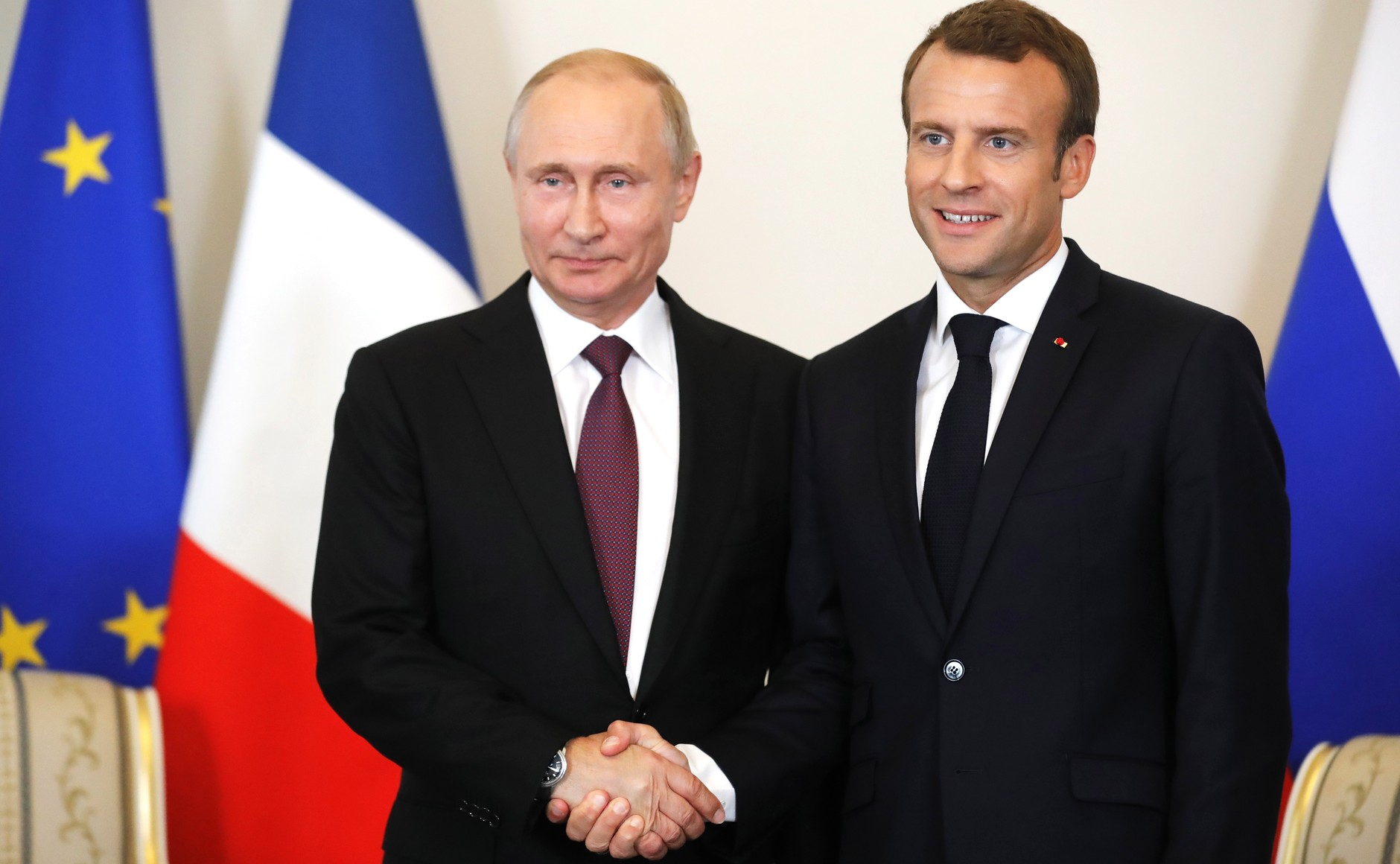
Macron shakes hands with Russian President Vladimir Putin in May 2018.

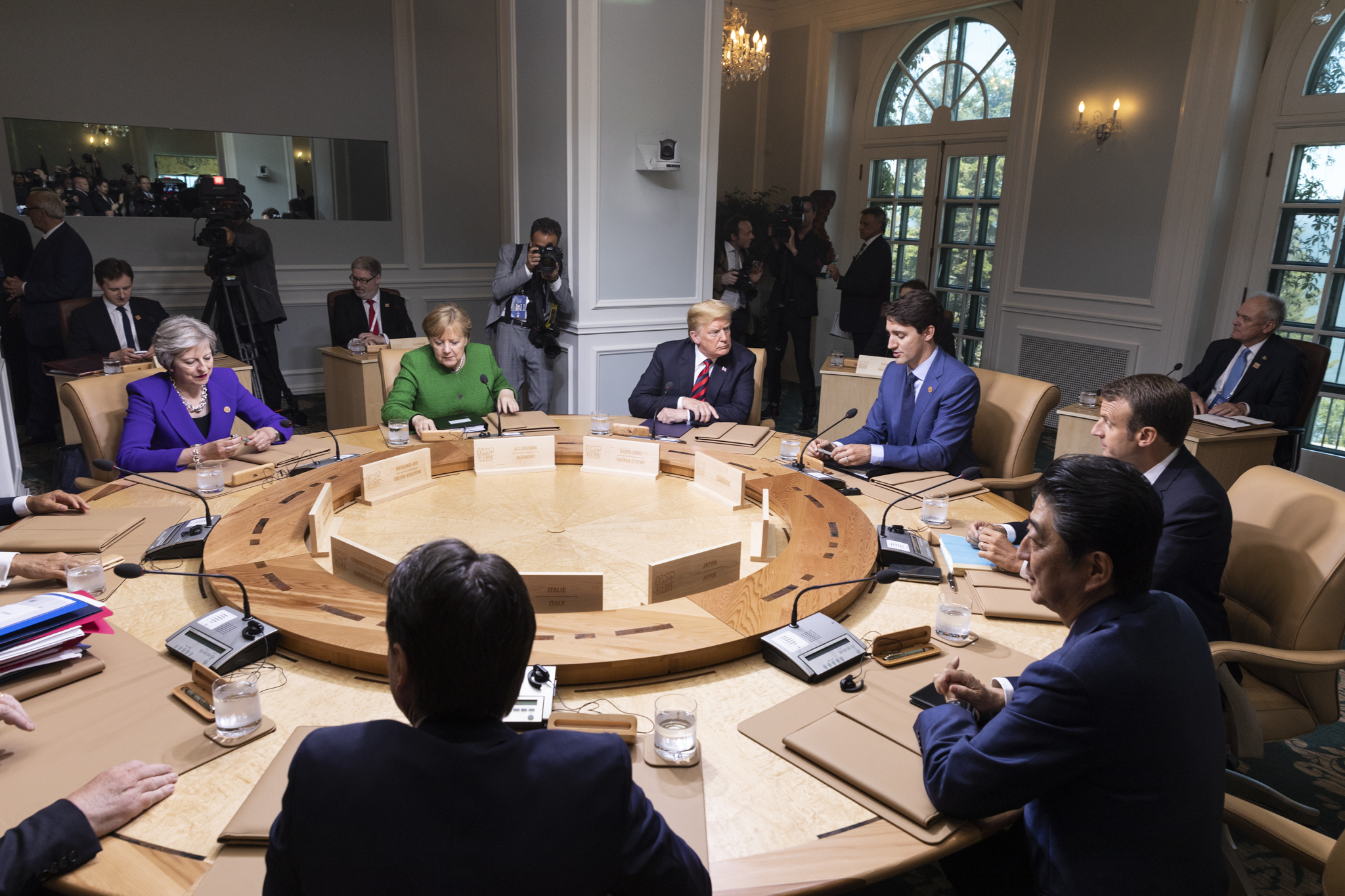
Macron with Donald Trump, Angela Merkel, Justin Trudeau, Shinzo Abe and other leaders at the 2018 G7 summit in Charlevoix, Quebec

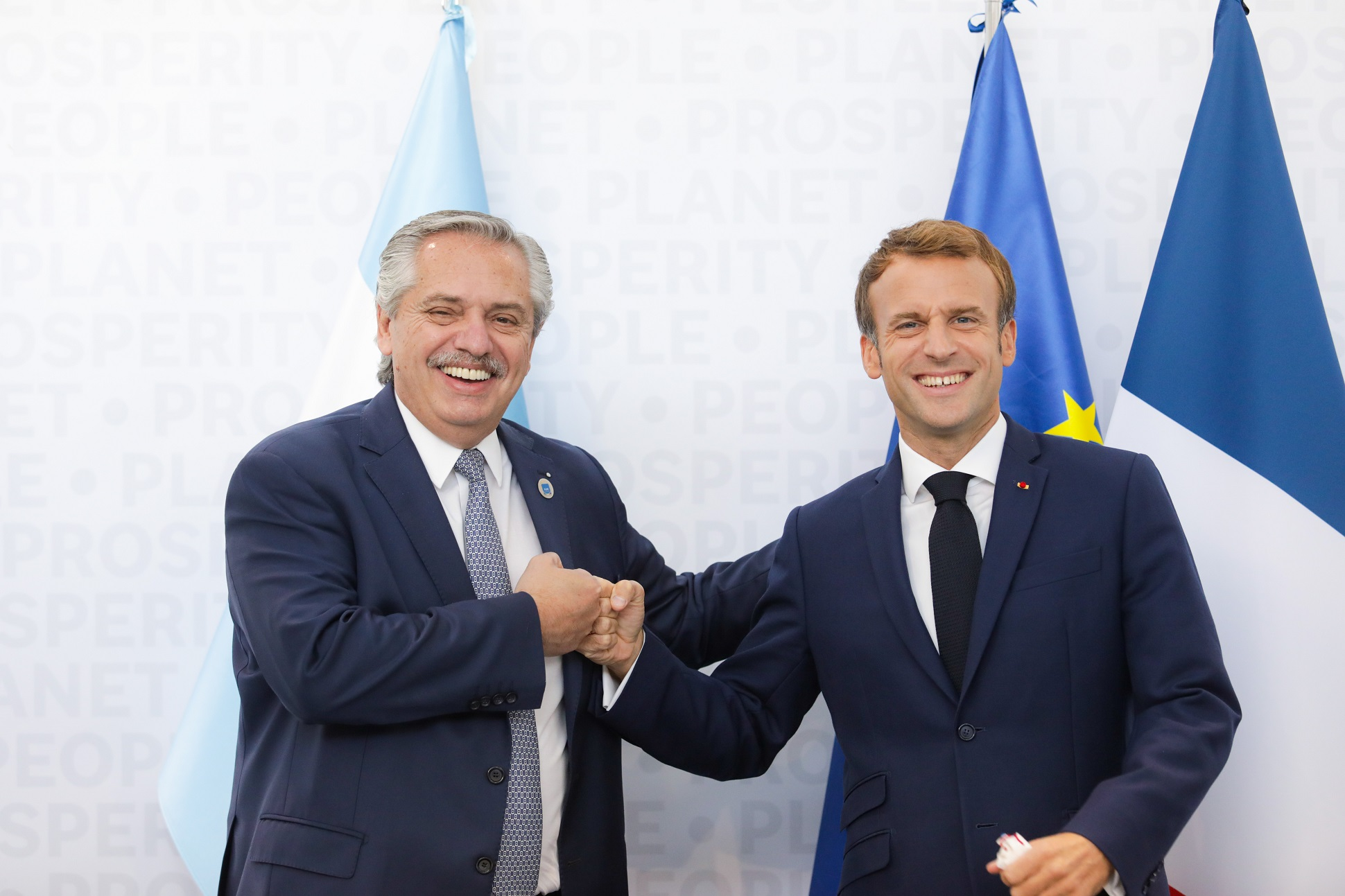
Macron with Argentina President Alberto Fernández at the G20 summit in October 2021

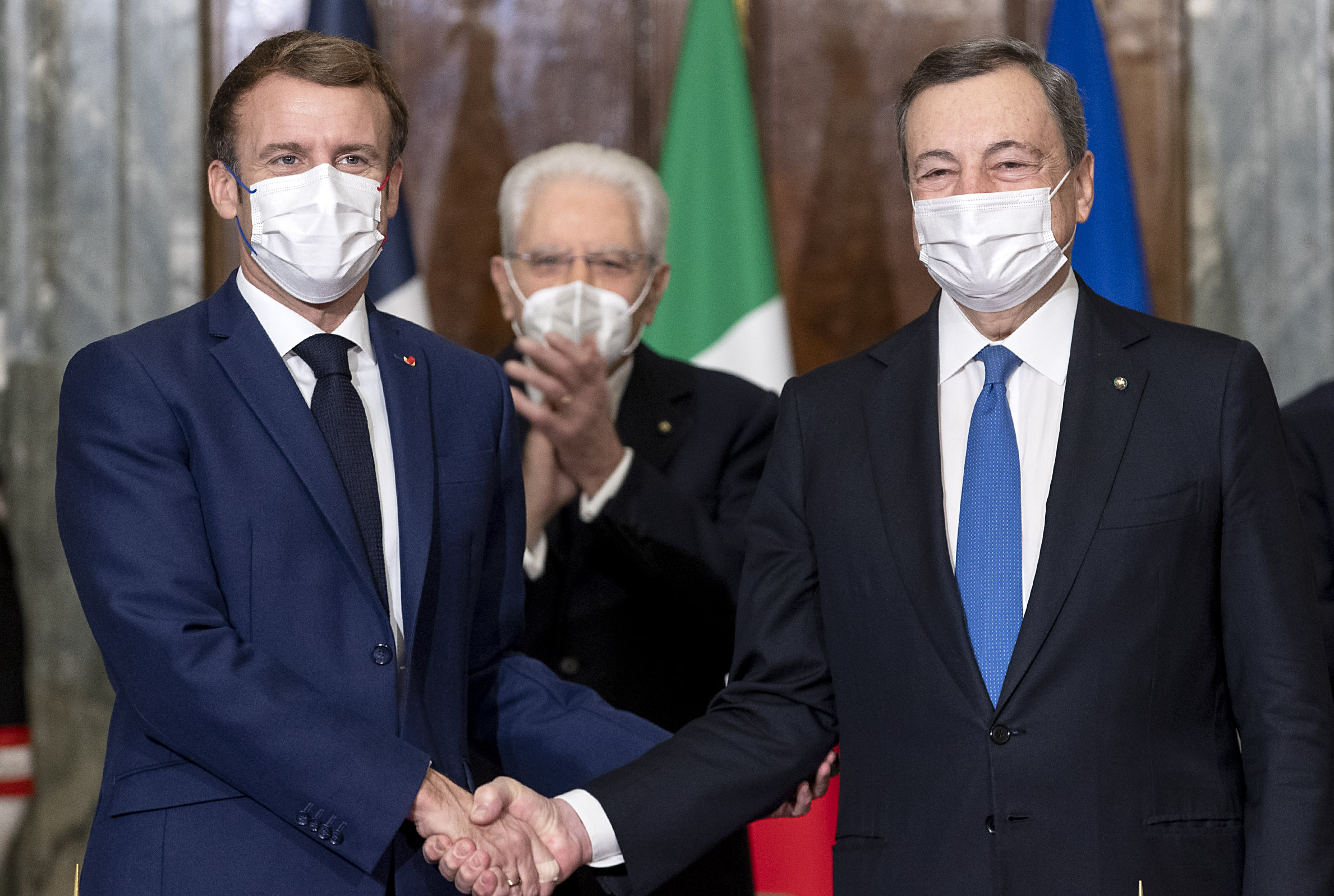
Macron and Italian Prime Minister Mario Draghi in 2021, following the signing of the Quirinal Treaty

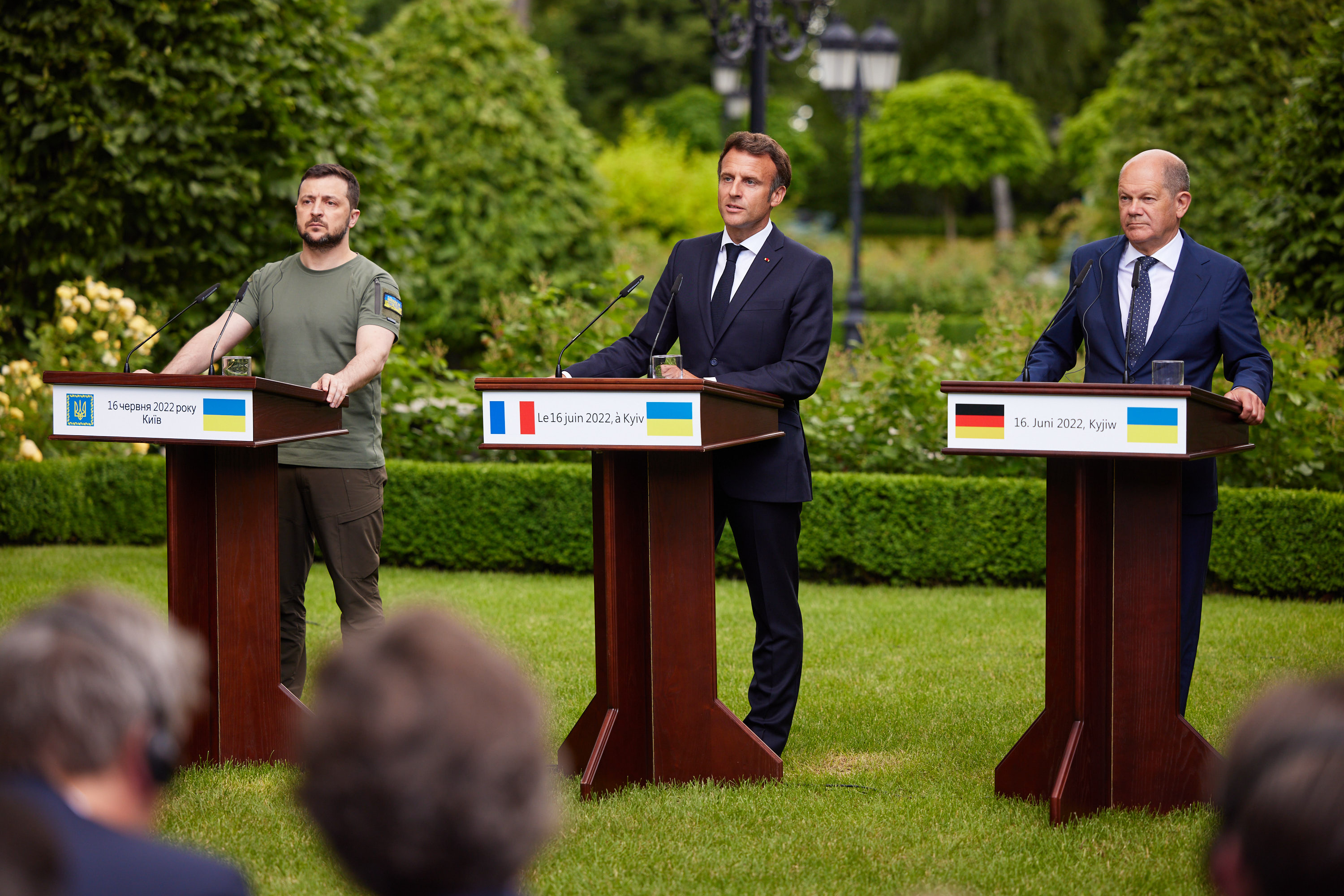
Macron, Ukrainian President Volodymyr Zelenskyy and German Chancellor Olaf Scholz in Kyiv in 2022

Macron attended the 2017 Brussels summit on 25 May 2017, his first NATO summit as president of France. At the summit, he met US President Donald Trump for the first time. The meeting was widely publicized due to a handshake between the two of them, characterized as a "power-struggle".

On 29 May 2017, Macron met with Vladimir Putin at the Palace of Versailles. The meeting sparked controversy when Macron denounced Russia Today and Sputnik, accusing the news agencies of being "organs of influence and propaganda, of lying propaganda". Macron also urged cooperation in the conflict against ISIS and warned that France would respond with force in Syria if chemical weapons were used. In response to the chemical attack in Douma, Syria in 2018, Macron directed French participation in airstrikes against Syrian government sites, coordinated with the United States and the United Kingdom.

In his first major foreign policy speech on 29 August, President Macron stated that fighting Islamist terrorism at home and abroad was France's top priority. Macron urged a tough international stance to pressure North Korea into negotiations, on the same day it fired a missile over Japan. He also affirmed his support for the Iranian nuclear deal and criticized Venezuela's government as a "dictatorship". He added that he would announce his new initiatives on the future of the European Union after the German elections in September. At the 56th Munich Security Conference in February, Macron presented his 10-year vision policy to strengthen the European Union. Macron remarked that larger budget, integrated capital markets, effective defence policy and quick decision-making held the key for Europe. He added that reliance on NATO and especially the US and the UK was not good for Europe, and a dialogue must be established with Russia.

Prior to the 45th G7 summit in Biarritz, France, Macron hosted Vladimir Putin at the Fort de Brégançon, stating that "Russia fully belongs within a Europe of values." At the summit itself, Macron was invited to attend on the margins by Iranian Foreign Minister Javad Zarif. Macron, who "attempted a high-risk diplomatic gambit", thought that the Foreign Minister of Iran might be able to defuse the tense situation over the Iranian nuclear programme in spite of the recent uptick in tensions between the Islamic Republic and the United States and Britain.

In March 2019, at a time when China–U.S. economic relations were troubled with a trade war underway, Macron and Chinese leader Xi Jinping signed a series of 15 large-scale trade and business agreements totaling 40 billion euros (US$45 billion) which covered many sectors over a period of years. This included a €30 billion purchase of airplanes from Airbus. Going beyond aviation, the new trade agreement covered French exports of chicken, a French-built offshore wind farm in China, a Franco-Chinese cooperation fund, as well as billions of Euros of co-financing between BNP Paribas and the Bank of China. Other plans included billions of euros to be spent on modernizing Chinese factories, as well as new ship building. In June 2019, Macron announced that France would designate 24 April as a national day of remembrance for the Armenian genocide.

In July 2020, Macron called for sanctions against Turkey for violating Greece's and Cyprus' sovereignty, saying it is "unacceptable that the maritime space of (EU) member states be violated and threatened". He also criticized Turkish military intervention in Libya. Macron said that "We have the right to expect more from Turkey than from Russia, given that it is a member of NATO."

In 2021, Macron was reported as saying Northern Ireland was not truly part of the United Kingdom following disputes with UK Prime Minister Boris Johnson over implementations of the Northern Ireland protocol. He later denied this, saying he was referring to the fact that Great Britain is separated from Northern Ireland by sea in reference to the Irish Sea border.

French-U.S. relations became tense in September 2021 due to fallout from the AUKUS security pact between the United States, the United Kingdom, and Australia. The security pact is directed at countering Chinese power in the Indo-Pacific region. As part of the agreement, the U.S. agreed to provide nuclear-powered submarines to Australia. After entering into AUKUS, the Australian government canceled an agreement that it had made with France for the provision of French conventionally powered submarines, angering the French government. On 17 September, France recalled its ambassadors from Australia and the US for consultations. Despite tension in the past, France had never before withdrawn its ambassador to the United States. After a call between Macron and U.S. President Joe Biden on request from the latter, the two leaders agreed to reduce bilateral tensions, and the White House acknowledged the crisis could have been averted if there had been open consultations between allies.

On 26 November 2021, Macron and Italian Prime Minister Mario Draghi signed the Quirinal Treaty at the Quirinal Palace in Rome. The treaty aimed to promote the convergence and coordination of French and Italian positions in matters of European and foreign policies, security and defence, migration policy, economy, education, research, culture and cross-border cooperation.

During the prelude to the 2022 Russian invasion of Ukraine, Macron spoke face-to-face and on the phone to Russian President Vladimir Putin. During Macron's campaign for the re-election, nearly two months after the Russian invasion began, Macron called on European leaders to maintain dialogue with Putin.

During his 2026 address to the UN General Assembly, Macron claimed that Hamas was 'never active' in the West Bank. This caused uproar in Israel because the statements are factually inaccurate.

===== Approval ratings =====
Approval and disapproval ratings of Macron

According to an IFOP poll for Le Journal du Dimanche, Macron started his five-year term with a 62% approval rating, which rose to 64% by 24 June. One month later, Macron suffered a 10% point drop in popularity, the largest at the beginning of a term for any president since Jacques Chirac in 1995, and by August, his popularity had fallen off 24 percentage points since June. This was attributed to his recent confrontations with former Chief of Defence Staff Pierre de Villiers, the nationalization of the Chantiers de l'Atlantique shipyard owned by the bankrupt STX Offshore & Shipbuilding, and a reduction in housing benefits.

By the end of September 2017, seven out of ten respondents said that they believed Emmanuel Macron was respecting his campaign promises, though a majority felt that the policies the government was putting forward were "unfair". Macron's popularity fell sharply again in 2018, reaching about 25% by the end of November during the yellow vests movement. During the COVID-19 pandemic in France, his popularity increased, reaching 50% at its highest in July 2020.

===== Benalla affair =====
On 18 July 2018, Le Monde revealed in an article that a member of Macron's staff Alexandre Benalla posed as a police officer and beat a protester during May Day demonstrations in Paris earlier in the year and was suspended for a period of 15 days before only being internally demoted. The Élysée failed to refer the case to the public prosecutor and a preliminary investigation into the case was not opened until the day after the publication of the article, and the lenient penalty served by Benalla raised questions within the opposition about whether the executive deliberately chose not to inform the public prosecutor as required under the code of criminal procedure.

===== Social Media Regulation =====
In August 2026, France's Constitutional Council struck down key provisions of a proposed law prohibiting social media access for minors under 15, ruling that a blanket ban constituted a disproportionate restriction on freedom of expression. Following the decision, President Macron announced a revised legislative proposal in September 2026 to align with constitutional and European Union standards.

==== 2022 presidential campaign ====
In the 2022 election, Macron was the first incumbent to be re-elected since Jacques Chirac defeated Jean-Marie Le Pen in the 2002 election. Macron again defeated Marine Le Pen in the runoff, this time by a closer margin, with 58.55% of the votes to Le Pen's 41.45%. Due to near-record abstentions, this represented 38.52% of registered voters, the lowest figure since Georges Pompidou's 37.5% in 1969. The French far-right received their highest vote total since the start of the French Republic, with nationalist candidates (Le Pen, Zemmour and Dupont-Aignan) winning 32.3% of the votes in the first round and Le Pen achieving a record 41.5% of the votes in the second round.

=== Second term (2022–present) ===
Though Macron's second inauguration took place on 7 May 2022, his second presidential term officially began on 14 May 2022.

==== Borne government ====
On 16 May 2022, Prime Minister Jean Castex resigned after 22 months as head of government. The same day, President Macron appointed Élisabeth Borne at the Hôtel Matignon, thus making her the second female PM in French history after Édith Cresson between 1991 and 1992. She then formed a new government on 20 May 2022.

==== 2022 legislative election ====
In June 2022, one month into his second term, less than two weeks before the end of the French presidency of the Council of the EU and days after he called for voters to hand him a "solid majority" in a controversial 'tarmac speech', Macron lost his parliamentary majority and was returned a hung parliament in the second round of the 2022 legislative election: Macron's presidential coalition, which enjoyed a 115-seat majority going into the election, failed to reach the threshold of 289 seats needed to command an overall majority in the National Assembly, retaining only 251 out of the 346 it had held in the previous Assembly, and falling 38 short of an absolute majority. Crucially, three close political allies to President Macron were defeated in the elections: incumbent President of the National Assembly Richard Ferrand, Macron's own LREM parliamentary party leader Christophe Castaner and MoDem parliamentary group leader Patrick Mignola, thus effectively "decapitating" Macron's parliamentary bloc leadership and further weakening the President's political position in hung parliament territory.

16th National Assembly of France, elected in 2022.

Three government ministers resigned after losing their seats: Justine Bénin (junior minister for the Sea), Brigitte Bourguignon (Minister for Health and Prevention) and Amélie de Montchalin (Minister for Ecological Transition).

Macron's government, still led by Prime Minister Élisabeth Borne, was reshuffled in early July 2022 and continued as a minority administration, after talks with opposition leaders to form a stable majority government failed.

==== Domestic affairs ====
Macron's second presidential term began with two significant political controversies. Hours after the new Borne cabinet was announced, rape accusations against newly appointed Minister for Solidarity Damien Abad were made public, and on 28 May, the handling of the 2022 UEFA Champions League final chaos at the Stade de France in Saint-Denis drew criticism at home and abroad.

Despite its minority status in the legislature after the 2022 legislative election, Macron's government passed bills to ease the cost-of-living crisis, to repeal the COVID-era "state of health emergency", and to revive the French nuclear energy sector. However, government proposals were defeated several times in the National Assembly and by the end of 2022, the Borne cabinet had had to use the provisions of Article 49.3 of the Constitution ten times in a row to pass the 2023 Government Budget and Social Security Budget.

In May 2024, protests and riots broke out in New Caledonia. On 22 May, Macron visited the island.

===== Pension reform =====
In March 2023, Macron's government passed a law raising the retirement age from 62 to 64, partly bypassing Parliament by again resorting to Article 49.3 to break the parliamentary deadlock. Nationwide protests that had begun when the bill was introduced back in January increased in intensity after the reform was passed without a solemn vote.

===== Votes of no-confidence in the Borne government =====
On 20 March 2023, Macron's cabinet, headed by Prime Minister Borne, survived a cross-party motion of no-confidence by only nine votes, the slimmest margin for such a vote since 1992.

On 12 June 2023, his government survived its 17th no-confidence motion since the beginning of the 16th legislature; the motion, brought by the left-wing NUPES coalition, fell 50 votes short of the 289 votes needed.

===== Nahel Merzouk riots =====
In early summer 2023, French authorities faced riots following the killing of Nahel M., aged 17, by a police officer during a traffic stop. To calm widespread unrest, comparable in intensity to the 2005 French riots, Macron's administration ramped up government response, with a total of 45,000 police officers deployed on the ground and a ministerial order advising courts to apply harsher sentences and accelerated procedures: this crackdown resulted in over 1,300 arrests on the fourth night of unrest alone, bringing the total number of arrests since the riots' beginning to over 2,000 as of 1 July.

===== 2023 government reshuffle =====
On 20 July 2023, Macron carried out a government reshuffle at the end of the "hundred days of appeasement and action" he called for in April 2023 following the violent protests surrounding the passage of his pension system reform. Pap Ndiaye and Marlène Schiappa were sacked as part of the reshuffle.

===== Defence policy =====
On 1 August 2023, Macron signed into law a multi-year military planning bill, which set the stage for a 40%-increase in military spending to a total of €413 billion between 2024 and 2030, after it was passed by the French parliament on 13 July 2023.

===== Immigration policy =====
In February 2023, Macron's government introduced an immigration and asylum bill aimed at removing deportation safeguards, fast-tracking asylum application process and immigration litigation, while also facilitating legalization of undocumented workers. His government later pulled the draft legislation amid fears of defeat in Parliament, instead planning to hold talks with the centre-right LR party before reintroducing the bill in the autumn.

In August 2023, in a lengthy interview with weekly magazine Le Point, Macron said that France "must significantly reduce immigration, starting with illegal immigration" because the "current situation is not sustainable".

On 11 December 2023, the "flagship" immigration bill introduced by Macron's government was unexpectedly defeated after the narrow passage of a motion for preliminary dismissal in the National Assembly. Political commentators and news media described the vote as a "spectacular debacle", eventually sparking a major political crisis for Macron's minority administration.

In an effort to salvage the bill, Macron's government sent the draft legislation to a joint parliamentary committee: it resulted in a deal with the conservative-controlled Senate on a drastically hardened bill. On 19 December 2023, the French Parliament passed the piece of legislation thanks to support from the conservative LR and far-right RN parliamentary groups and in spite of a major rebellion from Macron's own coalition and ministers. Health Minister Aurélien Rousseau, whom Macron had appointed to the government only six months earlier, resigned shortly after the vote.

===== Constitutional reform =====
On the 65th anniversary of the French Constitution on 4 October 2023, Macron unveiled avenues for constitutional reform: broadening the scope and relaxing rules for referendums; enshrining the right to abortion and climate protection in the Constitution; stepping up the level of territorial devolution; giving some form of political autonomy to Corsica and New Caledonia.

On 4 March 2024, a joint session of the French Parliament passed a constitutional amendment supported by Macron to protect abortion as a 'guaranteed freedom' in the Constitution. It represented the first constitutional reform since 2008 and the first since Macron took office in 2017.

===== Attal government =====
In January 2024, in the wake of the government crisis produced by the passage of the 'controversial' immigration bill, Macron requested Prime Minister Élisabeth Borne to resign and subsequently replaced her by Education minister Gabriel Attal, making him both the youngest head of government in French history and the first openly gay man ever to hold the job.

The new Attal cabinet was widely described as the most right-leaning government since the start of the Macron Presidency: out of the 14 Cabinet ministers appointed on 11 January 2024 by Macron and Attal, 57% are former members of the conservative UMP/LR party, while prominent left-leaning ministers of the outgoing Borne government were sacked, moves described as indicating a notable tilt to the right.

===== Economy =====
In February 2024, amid slowing economic growth and disappointing unemployment figures, Macron's government unveiled €10 billion in emergency spending cuts to hold to its 2024 deficit goal.

A month later, Macron convened a 'crisis meeting' to discuss the state of France's public finances amid reports showing that the government had heavily missed its 2023 fiscal targets, with a bigger-than-forecasted deficit, putting the country's credit rating at risk of downgrade.

==== 2024 snap legislative election ====
On 9 June 2024, following the results of the 2024 European Parliament elections in which his centrist grouping received only 14.6% of the votes, finishing nearly 17 points behind Le Pen's RN party, Macron unexpectedly dissolved the National Assembly and called for an early legislative election to be held on 30 June and 7 July 2024.

In the first round of the election, on 30 June, Macron's grouping received only 20.04% of the votes nationwide, placing third well behind the hard-right RN (33.15%) and the left-wing NFP alliance (27.99%), which constituted the worst electoral performance for a governing coalition in a general election since the start of the modern French Republic in 1870. Exit polls released shortly after 8pm on 30 June suggested the RN-led alliance was on course to win either a plurality of seats or an outright majority in the second round, while Macron's coalition was set to lose at least half of the seats it won in 2022.

In the second round, on 7 July, Macron was handed another hung parliament with the left-wing coalition unexpectedly winning a plurality of seats though 90 to 100 seats short of an overall majority, leaving the left theoretically unable to form a government on its own. Macron's grouping lost both 86 seats and its status as the largest parliamentary bloc while the RN-led alliance, though dramatically underperforming the polls, still managed to make significant gains, eventually becoming the largest single party in the new National Assembly. The results presented unprecedented potential for political crisis and parliamentary gridlock.

17th National Assembly of France, elected in 2024.

Shortly after exit polls were released on the night of 7 July, Macron's Prime Minister, Gabriel Attal, announced he would tender his resignation to the President. The following day, Macron refused Attal's resignation, instead asking him to stay on until a new government could be formed.

On 27 August, Macron refused to appoint NFP-designate Lucie Castets as prime minister.

After holding talks with leaders from parties represented in Parliament in an effort to find a working majority, Macron appointed conservative figure Michel Barnier as Prime Minister on 5 September and invited him to form a "unity government". Barnier's appointment was seen as a growing sign of Le Pen's influence on French politics since she had previously blocked the appointment of Xavier Bertrand, another conservative figure seen as a serious contender for the premiership.

===== Vote of no-confidence in the Barnier government =====
In early December 2024, Prime Minister Michel Barnier resorted to Article 49.3 of the Constitution to pass the 2025 Social Security budget without parliamentary approval. In response to Barnier's move, the National Assembly approved a vote of no confidence on 4 December, effectively bringing down the government. Barnier resigned, but Macron vowed to stay in office until the end of his term. It was the first French cabinet to be toppled by Parliament since 1962. Macron addressed the country on 5 December. He accepted the resignation of Barnier but vowed to remain in office until the end of his term. He blamed an alliance of 'extreme left and extreme right' for the collapse of the French government.

==== Foreign affairs ====
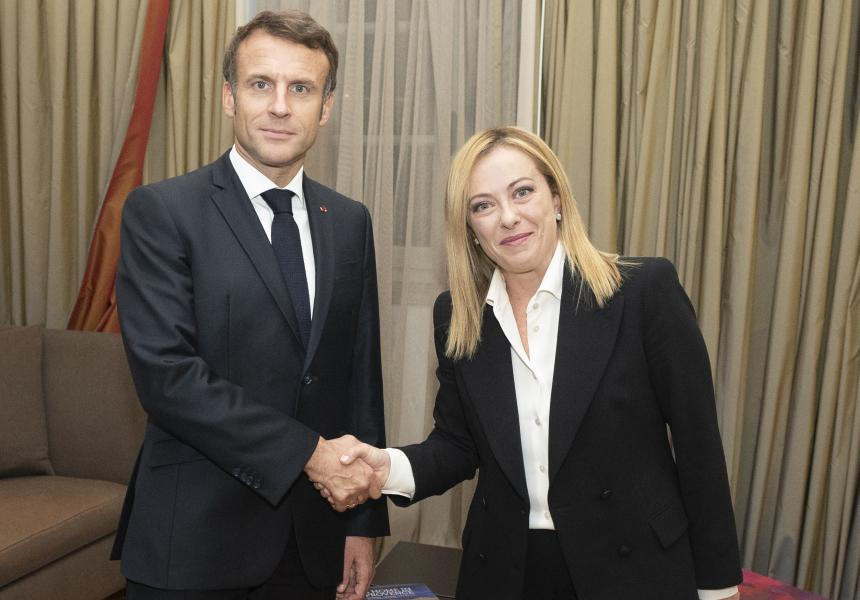
Macron with Italian Prime Minister Giorgia Meloni in October 2022

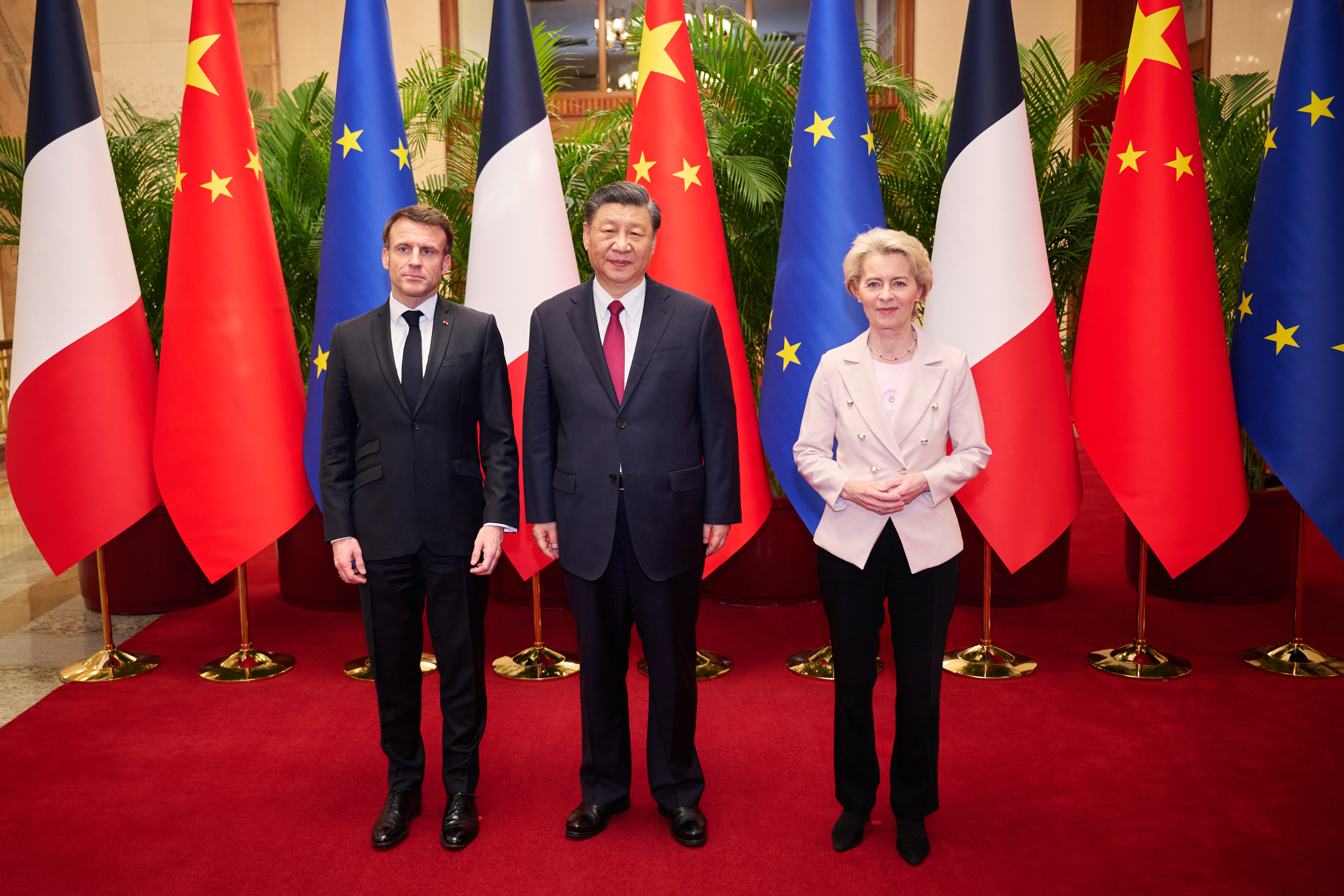
Macron, President of the European Commission Ursula von der Leyen and Chinese President Xi Jinping at the 2023 France–China Summit

On 16 June 2022, Macron visited Ukraine alongside German Chancellor Olaf Scholz and Italy's Prime Minister Mario Draghi. He met with Ukraine's President Volodymyr Zelenskyy and expressed "European Unity" for Ukraine. He said that the nations that remained neutral in the Russo-Ukrainian War made a historic mistake and were complicit in a new imperialism.

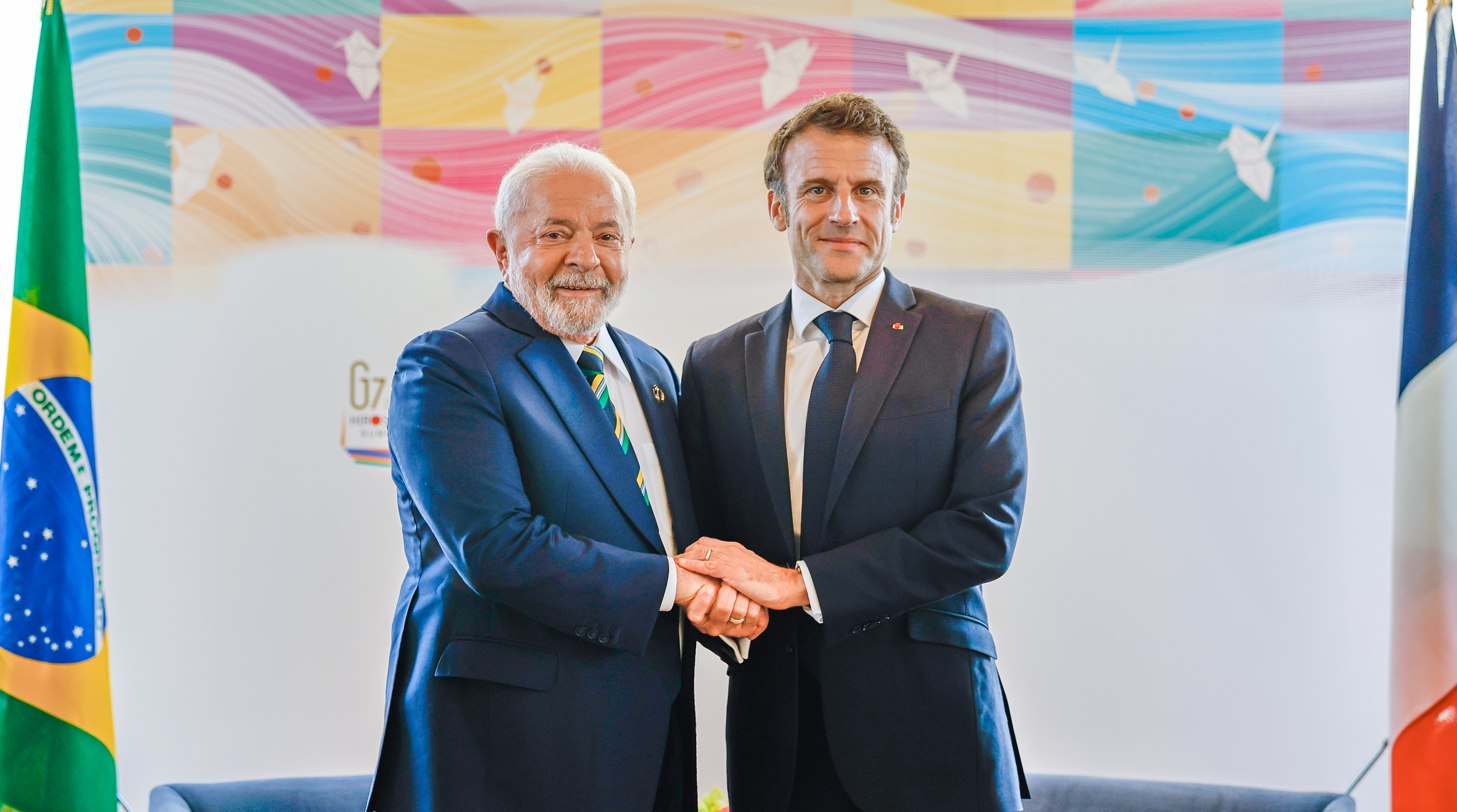
Macron with Brazilian President Luiz Inácio Lula da Silva in May 2023

In September 2022, Macron criticized the United States, Norway and other "friendly" natural gas supplier states for the extremely high prices of their supplies, saying in October 2022 that Europeans are "paying four times as much as the price at which you sell to your industry. That is not exactly the meaning of friendship."

Macron and his wife attended the state funeral of Queen Elizabeth II in Westminster Abbey, London, on 19 September 2022, and the coronation of King Charles III the following year.

On 23 October 2022, Macron became the first foreign leader to meet new Italian Prime Minister Giorgia Meloni, just a day after she and her ministers were sworn into office.

During a summit to China with European Commission President Ursula von der Leyen, which included a formal meeting with Xi Jinping, the General Secretary of the Chinese Communist Party and President of China, Macron called for Europe to reduce its dependence on the United States in general and to stay neutral and avoid being drawn into any possible confrontation between the U.S. and China over Taiwan. Speaking after a three-day state visit to China, Macron emphasised his theory of strategic autonomy, suggesting that Europe could become a "third superpower". He argued that Europe should focus on boosting its own defence industries and additionally reduce its dependence on the United States dollar (USD). in a follow-up speech in The Hague to further outline his vision of strategic autonomy for Europe. On 7 June 2023, a report by the pan-European think tank European Council on Foreign Relations (ECFR) found that most Europeans agree with Macron's views on China and the United States.

In February 2023, he welcomed Ethiopian Prime Minister Abiy Ahmed in Paris to normalize relations between France and Ethiopia, strained by the Tigray War between the Ethiopian government and Tigray rebels.

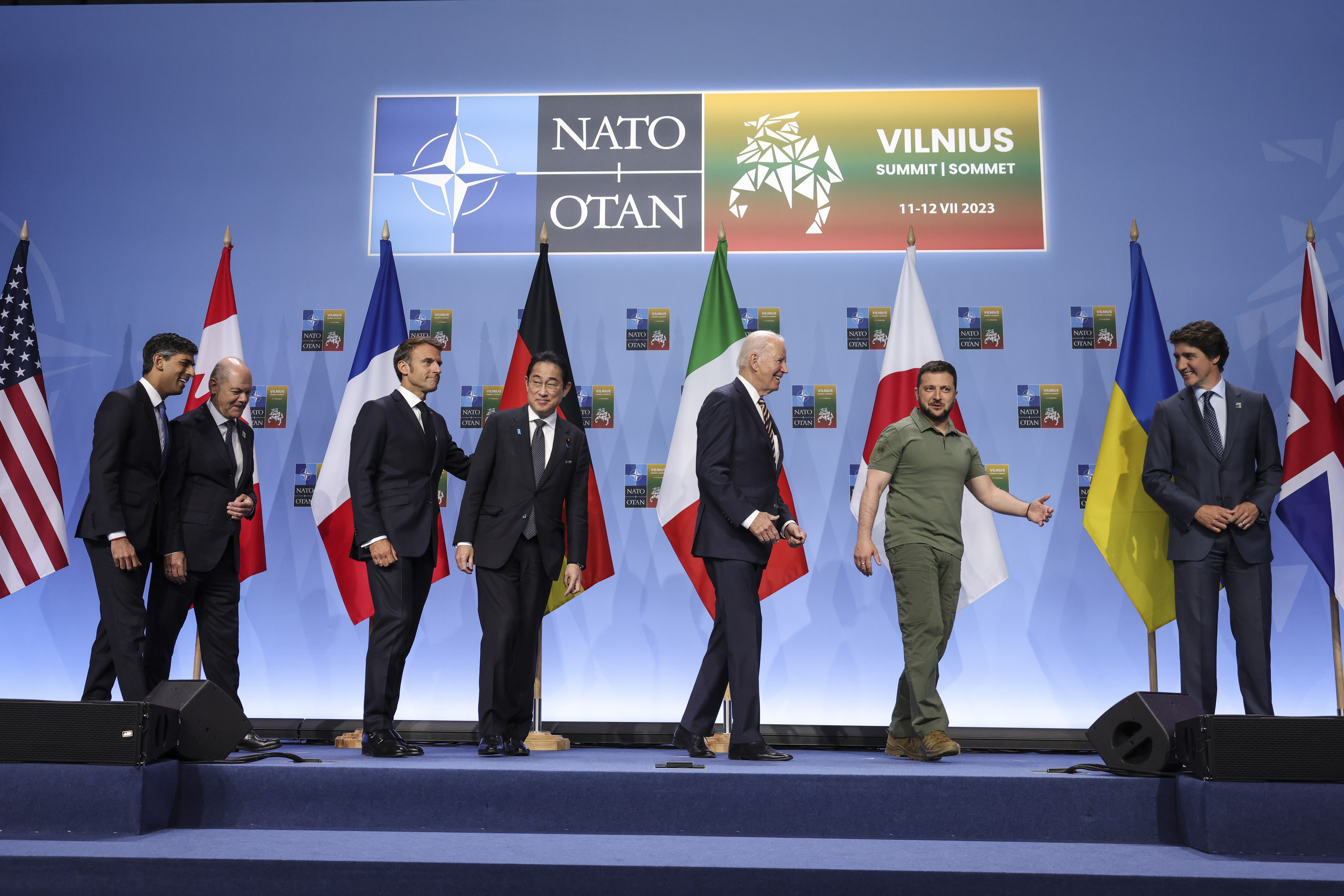
Macron at the NATO Summit in Vilnius on 12 July 2023

On 31 May 2023 Macron visited the GLOBSEC forum in Bratislava, where he again delivered a speech on European sovereignty. During the question and answer session that followed the Bratislava speech, he said that negotiating with Putin may have to take priority over any war crimes tribunal which some others, including Zelenskyy, wish to see.

On 12 June 2023, Macron promised to deliver more ammunition, weapons and armed vehicles to help Ukrainian forces with the ongoing counter-offensive to liberate Russian-occupied southeastern Ukraine. At the NATO Summit in Vilnius, he promised to supply Ukraine with Scalp long-range cruise missiles to hit Russian targets deep behind the front lines. On 10 November 2023, he said that what Russia is doing in Ukraine is "imperialism and colonialism" and it was the "duty" of France and other countries to help Ukraine defend itself, but added that maybe the time will come to hold fair peace negotiations and find a solution with Russia.

In June 2023 Macron hosted a global climate finance conference described by many as the new Bretton Woods Conference. The purpose is to adjust the global economy to the contemporary threats of climate change and hunger. One of the propositions is to offer low income countries aid instead of credit so they can use their resources for stopping climate change and poverty instead of debt payments. Macron supported the idea, but a climate activist from Uganda remarked that the promises were meaningless if at the same time Macron supported projects such as the East African Crude Oil Pipeline, a major threat to the climate and to the drinking water of 40 million people. At the summit Macron proposed an international taxation system and debt restructuring but stressed it can have an effect only with international cooperation.

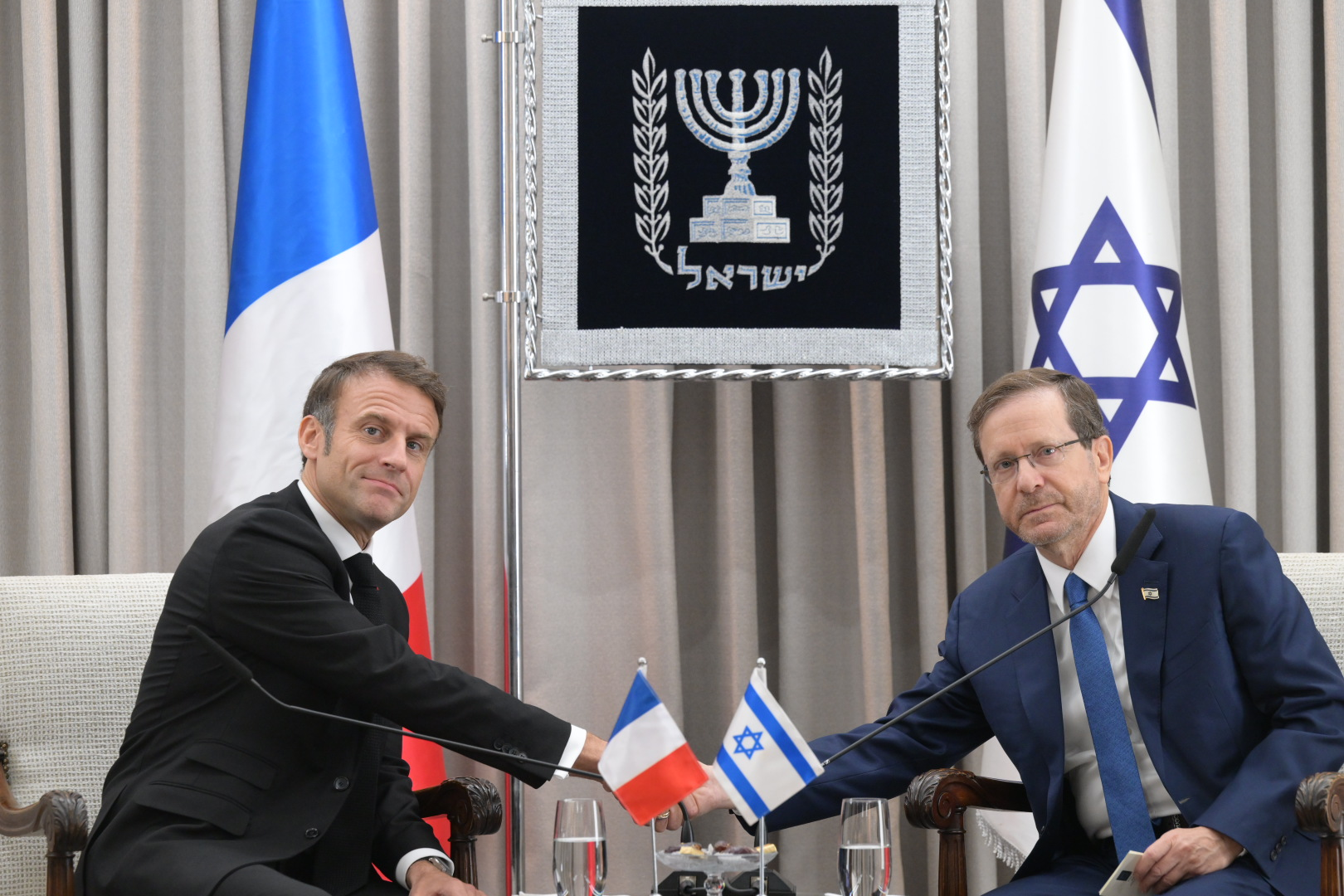
Macron with Israeli President Isaac Herzog in Jerusalem, Israel, 24 October 2023

In July 2023, Macron postponed his planned state visit to Germany due to the ongoing Nahel M. riots.

In October 2023, Macron condemned Hamas's actions during the Gaza war and expressed his support to Israel and its right to self-defense. On 10 November 2023, he called for a ceasefire and urged Israel to stop bombing Gaza and killing civilians. In July 2025, Macron announced that at the next meeting of the UN General Assembly, France would officially recognise a Palestinian state.

In February 2024, during a meeting with other European states, Macron generated controversy by suggesting sending ground troops to Ukraine. On 28 May 2024, Macron gave Ukraine permission to use SCALP EG missiles against targets on Russian soil. Such usage was instructed to be limited "to neutralize military sites from which missiles are being fired, military sites from which Ukraine is being attacked". On 24 February 2025, during a meeting with US President Donald Trump, Macron said that a truce between Ukraine and Russia could be agreed in the coming weeks. On 22 February 2025, Macron pledged to continue its supply of defense equipment to Armenia after the 2020 Nagorno-Karabakh war, as well as humanitarian aid of 29 million euros to displaced Armenians from Nagorno-Karabakh. He also stated support for the International Court of Justice's decision on 17 November 2023, of which calls on the rights of ethnic Armenian residents to return safely to their homeland.

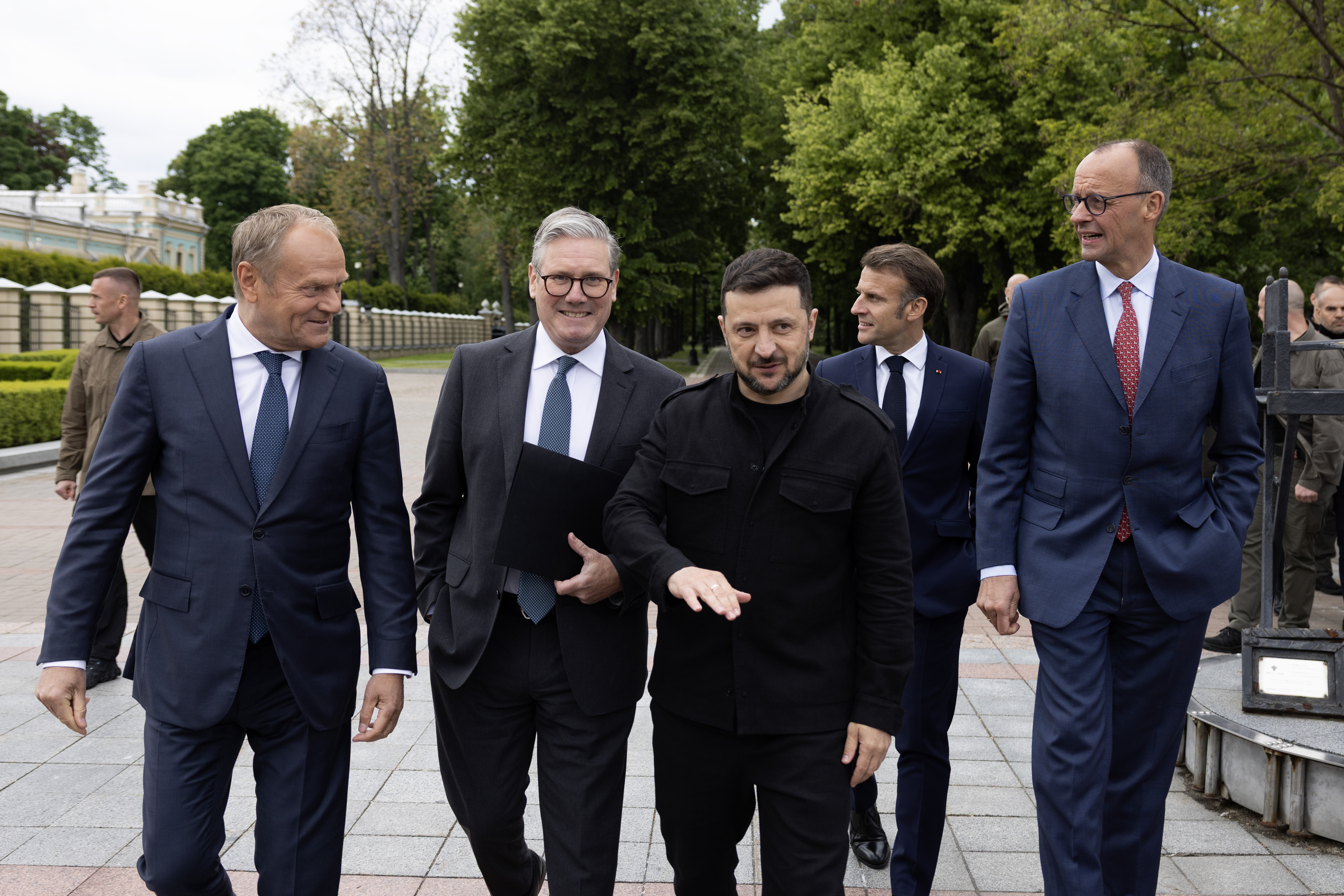
German Chancellor Friedrich Merz, Macron, British Prime Minister Keir Starmer and Polish Prime Minister Donald Tusk with Ukrainian President Volodymyr Zelenskyy in Ukraine in May 2025

In February 2025, Macron characterised Russia as an "existential threat" to Europe, convening a special meeting in Paris to coordinate European responses under the Weimar+ framework. In March 2025, German lawmakers approved an amendment to the Basic Law that would allow Friedrich Merz's government to implement the most massive rearmament of Germany since World War II. Germany's decision to massively increase defense spending was welcomed by Macron.

Following the Israeli strikes on Iran on 13 June 2025, Macron called for "maximum restraint" while reaffirming "Israel's right to defend itself and ensure its security." On 17 June 2025, he claimed that president Trump's haste departure from the G7 summit, was to reach a cease fire between Israel and Iran. To which Trump responded "Wrong! He has no idea why I am now on my way to Washington, but it certainly has nothing to do with a Cease Fire. Much bigger than that. Whether purposely or not, Emmanuel always gets it wrong. Stay Tuned!". On 23 June 2025, Macron called Trump's air strikes on Iranian nuclear sites "illegal" and counterproductive, and called for the resumption of diplomatic talks with Iran.

In 2026, speaking at the Africa Forward Summit in Nairobi, Kenya, Macron called for an immediate ceasefire in the Sudanese civil war and an end to external support for the belligerents. He stated that the conflict was being fuelled by external forces financing the warring parties and described the situation as involving war crimes and a severe humanitarian crisis. During his presidency, France faced criticism after Amnesty International reported that French-manufactured military systems were being used by Sudan’s Rapid Support Forces (RSF) on armoured vehicles supplied by the United Arab Emirates. Amnesty called on France to suspend further transfers of the equipment to the United Arab Emirates.

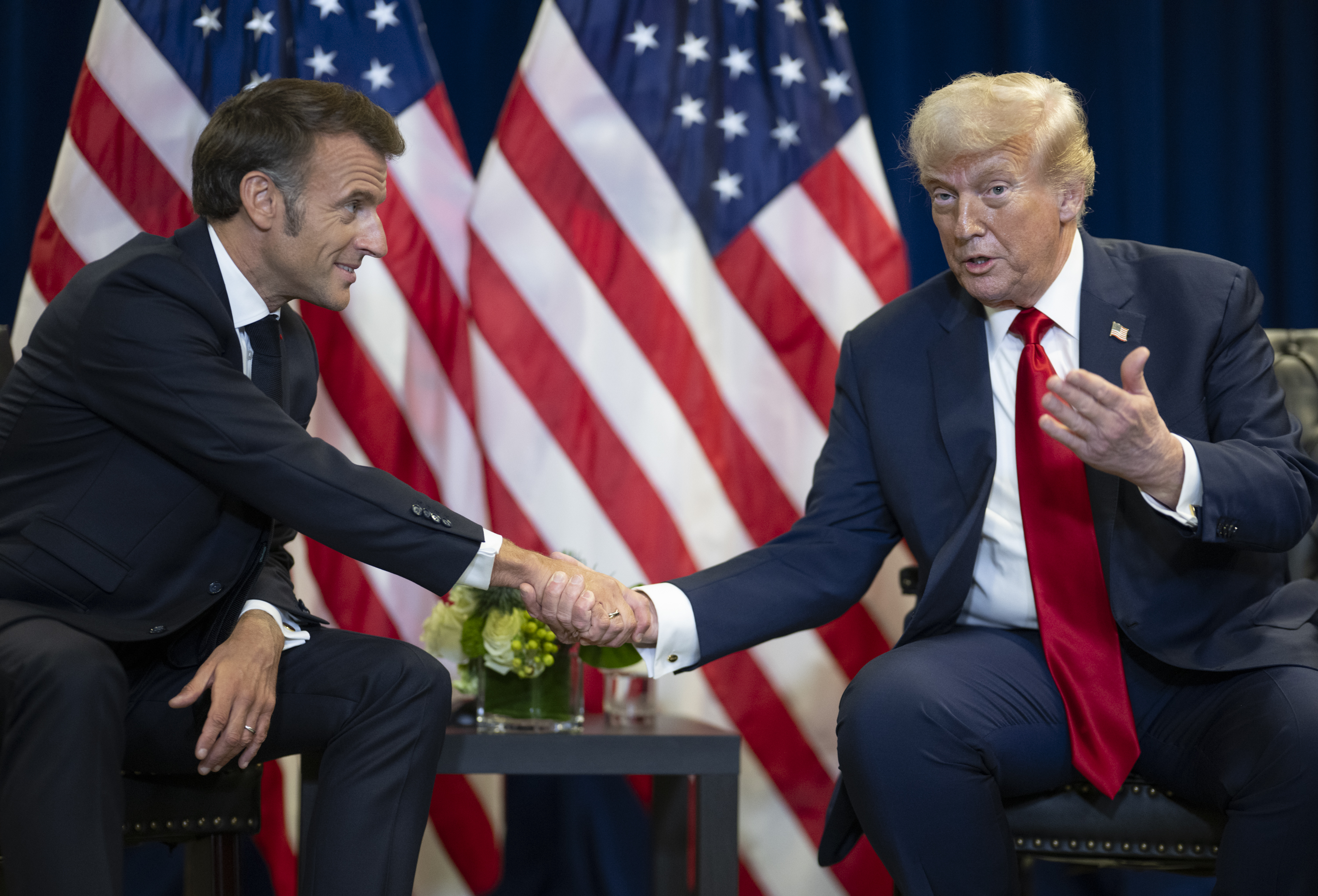
Macron and U.S. President Donald Trump at the UN General Assembly in New York City, 23 September 2025

In January 2026, following the capture of Nicolás Maduro by U.S. forces, Macron formally called for Edmundo González to lead a "peaceful, democratic" transition in Venezuela. Macron praised the removal of the "Maduro dictatorship," stating that the Venezuelan people "can only rejoice" at being rid of his rule.

On 9 January 2026, Macron, along with British Prime Minister Keir Starmer and German Chancellor Friedrich Merz, issued a joint statement addressing the escalating anti-government protests in Iran, which had started in late December 2025. In their statement, they called on the Iranian authorities to exercise restraint and to avoid further violence.

During his speech at the World Economic Forum in Davos on 20 January 2026, Macron emphasized the importance of increasing Chinese foreign direct investment (FDI) in key European sectors to promote economic growth and facilitate technology transfer. He urged China to move beyond simply exporting products to Europe and instead focus on local manufacturing and physical presence on the continent.

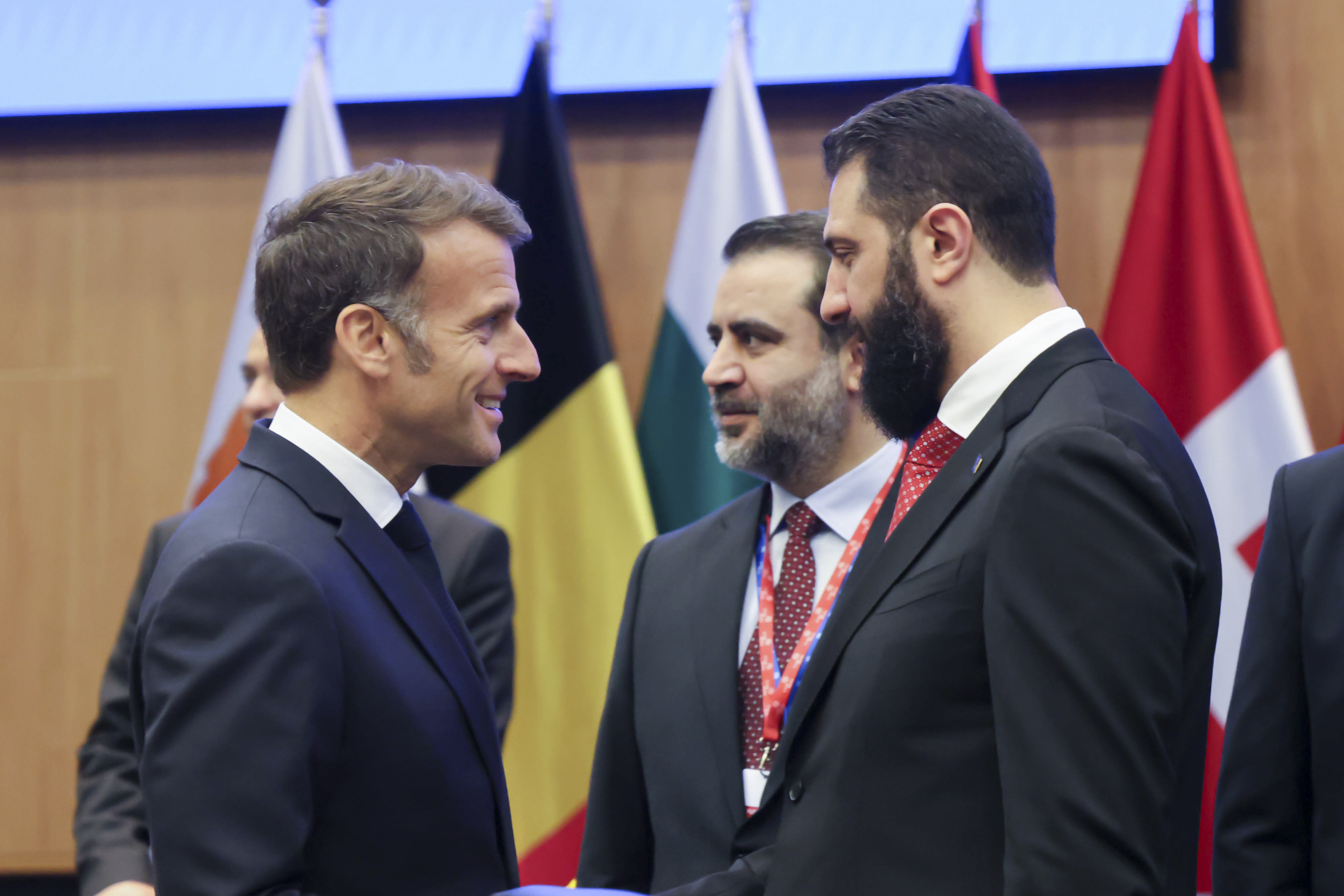
Macron, Syrian President Ahmed al-Sharaa, and Syrian Foreign Minister Asaad al-Shaibani, 24 April 2026

In March 2026, Macron described the U.S.–Israeli strikes on Iran as illegal, while maintaining that Iran held "primary responsibility" for the regional escalation. Despite criticizing the strikes, he reaffirmed France's commitment to regional allies and deployed the aircraft carrier Charles de Gaulle to the Mediterranean for defensive and escort missions. In September 2026, Macron announced that the country will send soldiers to protect Saudi Arabia on a Red Sea oil route, as part of an accord with Saudis.

==== Controversies ====
===== Uber Files =====
On 10 July 2022, The Guardian revealed that Macron had assisted Uber in lobbying during his term as the Minister of Economics and Finance, leading to calls from opposition lawmakers for a parliamentary inquiry. In his own defence, Macron expressed that he "did his job" and that he would "do it again tomorrow and the day after tomorrow". He stated, "I'm proud of it".

=== Co-prince of Andorra ===
As president of France, Macron also serves ex officio as one of the two co-princes of Andorra. His chief of staff Patrick Strzoda serves as his representative in this capacity. Joan Enric Vives i Sicília, appointed as the Bishop of Urgell on 12 May 2003, served as Macron's co-prince until Josep-Lluís Serrano Pentinat succeeded him in 2025. Macron swore the Constitution of Andorra through Strzoda in an act that took place on 15 June 2017 in Casa de la Vall. Macron visited the country on a State visit on 12 September 2019. The following day he spoke at the historic building of the General Council of Andorra alongside Episcopal Co-Prince Joan Enric Vives, Prime Minister Xavier Espot and the General Syndic Roser Suñé Pascuet.

During the COVID-19 pandemic, the Andorran government asked France for economic aid, but Macron refused, arguing that the Bank of France could not offer loans to another country without the approval of the European Central Bank.

In January 2024, former New Caledonian high commissioner Patrice Faure was appointed chief of staff to Macron, and in November, his representative to Andorra.

== Political positions ==
Macron's political views have been described as moderate, centrist, and pragmatic.

== Personal life ==
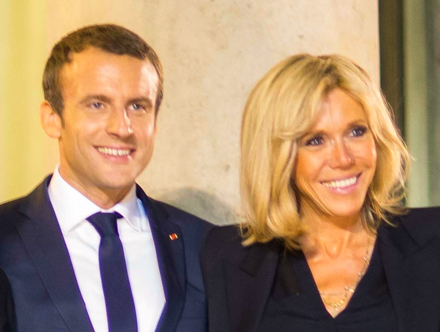
Emmanuel Macron and his wife Brigitte in 2017

Macron is married to Brigitte Trogneux. She is his former La Providence High School teacher and is close to 25 years his senior. They met during a theatre workshop that she was giving when she was a 39-year-old teacher and he was a 15-year-old student and classmate of her daughter. A romantic relationship started later, and his parents attempted to separate the couple by sending him away to Paris to finish the final year of his schooling, as they felt his youth made this relationship inappropriate. (The age of consent in France is 15.) The couple reunited after Macron graduated and were married in 2007. She has three children from a previous marriage; he has no children of his own. Her role in Macron's 2017 presidential campaign has been considered pivotal, with close Macron allies stating that Brigitte Macron helped him to develop skills such as public speaking.

His best man was Henry Hermand, a businessman who loaned €550,000 to Macron for the purchase of his first apartment in Paris when he was Inspector of Finances. Hermand also let Macron use some of his offices on the Avenue des Champs Élysées in Paris for his movement En Marche.

In the 2002 French presidential election, Macron voted for souverainist Jean-Pierre Chevènement. In 2007 Macron voted for Ségolène Royal in the second round of the presidential election. During the Socialist Party primary in 2011, Macron voiced his support for François Hollande.

Macron plays the piano, which he studied for ten years in his youth. He especially enjoys the work of Robert Schumann and Franz Liszt. Macron also skis, plays tennis, and enjoys boxing. In addition to his native French, Macron speaks fluent English.

In August 2017, a photojournalist was arrested and detained by the police for six hours after he entered the private residence where Macron was vacationing in Marseille. Macron subsequently filed a complaint for "harassment". In September 2017, he dropped the complaint "as a gesture of appeasement".

On 27 August 2017, Macron and his wife Brigitte adopted Nemo, a black Labrador Retriever-Griffon dog who lives with them in the Élysée Palace.

When he was a schoolboy, Macron decided to be baptised as a Catholic. In June 2018, prior to meeting Pope Francis, he identified himself as an agnostic Catholic. In the same year he agreed to become an honorary canon of St John Lateran, the cathedral of Rome.

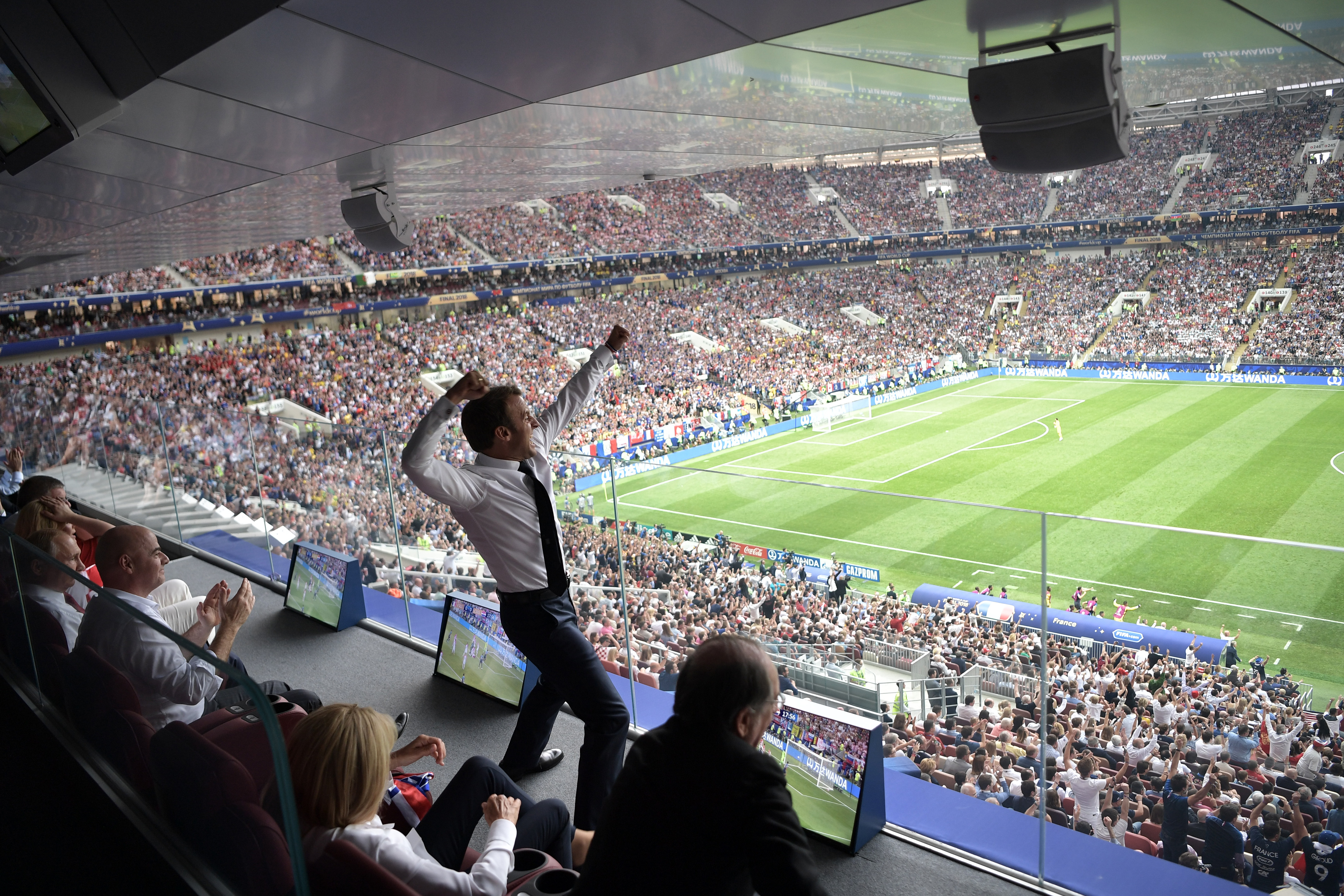
Macron celebrating France's victory over Croatia in the 2018 World Cup final in Moscow, Russia

A fan of football, Macron is a supporter of French club Olympique de Marseille. During the 2018 World Cup, he attended the semi-final between France and Belgium with the Belgian King Philippe and Queen Mathilde; and at the World Cup final against Croatia, he sat and celebrated alongside Croatian president Kolinda Grabar-Kitarović. Macron received widespread media attention for his celebrations and his interactions with the Croatian president.

At a new year's celebration for military forces on 15 January 2026, Macron was seen with a bulging eye. The condition is known as a "sub-conjunctival haemorrhage". He chose to wear aviator sunglasses in public spaces to obscure this injury. After gaining attention for wearing aviator sunglasses while speaking at the World Economic Forum in Davos on 20 January, demand for Henry Jullien sunglasses spiked. The brand's website crashed and its parent company, iVision, saw its stock price increase by 28%.

== Honours and decorations ==
=== National honours ===
Ribbon bar	Honour	Date and comment
	Grand Master and Grand Cross of the National Order of the Legion of Honour	14 May 2017 – automatic upon taking presidential office
	Grand Master and Grand Cross of the National Order of Merit	14 May 2017 – automatic upon taking presidential office

=== Foreign honours ===
Ribbon bar	Country	Honour	Date
	Holy See	Proto-canon of the Papal Basilica of St. John Lateran (2017 – present; the post is held ex officio by the French Head of State)	16 June 2018 – present
	United Kingdom	Honorary Commander of the Order of the British Empire	5 June 2014
	Mexico	Sash of the Order of the Aztec Eagle	22 September 2016
	Greece	Grand Cross of the Order of the Redeemer	7 September 2017
	Lebanon	Grand Cross of the Order of Merit	22 September 2017
	Tunisia	Grand Cordon of the Order of the Republic of Tunisia	31 January 2018
	Senegal	Grand Cross of the National Order of the Lion	2 February 2018
	Luxembourg	Grand Cross of the Order of the Gold Lion of the House of Nassau	19 March 2018
	Denmark	Knight of the Order of the Elephant	28 August 2018
	Finland	Grand Cross of the Order of the White Rose with Collar	29 August 2018
	South Korea	Grand Cordon of the Grand Order of Mugunghwa	8 October 2018
	Belgium	Grand Cordon of the Order of Leopold	19 November 2018
	Ivory Coast	Grand Cross of the National Order of the Ivory Coast	20 December 2019
	Egypt	Collar of the Order of the Nile	7 December 2020
	United States	Chief Commander of the Legion of Merit	8 December 2020
	Italy	Knight Grand Cross with Collar of the Order of Merit of the Italian Republic	1 July 2021
	United Arab Emirates	Collar of the Order of Zayed	18 July 2022
	Netherlands	Knight Grand Cross of the Order of the Netherlands Lion	11 April 2023
	United Kingdom	Honorary Knight Grand Cross of the Order of the Bath	20 September 2023
	Sweden	Knight of the Royal Order of the Seraphim	30 January 2024
	Qatar	Recipient of the Sword of the Founder Sheikh Jassim bin Mohammed Al Thani	27 February 2024
	Moldova	Collar of the Order of the Republic	7 March 2024
	Brazil	Grand Collar of the Order of the Southern Cross. Grand officer as Deputy Secretary-General to the President on 9 December 2012.	28 March 2024
	Andorra	Cross of the Seven Arms As Coprince, he automatically receives the highest Andorran decoration.	10 July 2024
	International Olympic Committee	Recipient of the Gold Olympic Order	29 August 2024
	Morocco	Grand Collar of the Order of Muhammad	29 October 2024
	Portugal	Grand Collar of the Order of Liberty	27 February 2025
	Monaco	Grand Cross of the Order of Saint Charles	7 June 2025
	Norway	Grand Cross of the Order of St. Olav	23 June 2025
	Mauritius	Grand Commander of the Order of the Star and Key of the Indian Ocean	20 November 2025
	Armenia	Grand Cordon of the Order of Glory	4 May 2026
	Montenegro	First Class of the Order of the Republic of Montenegro	4 June 2026
	Ukraine	Medal of the Order of Liberty	13 July 2026
	Spain	Collar of the Order of Isabella the Catholic	23 September 2026
	Kuwait	Collar of the Order of Mubarak the Great	19 October 2026
	Bahrain	Collar with Grand Cordon of the Order of Sheikh Isa bin Salman Al Khalifa	20 October 2026

== Prizes ==
- Le Trombinoscope (2014, 2016)
- Charlemagne Prize (2018)
- Champion of the Earth (2018)
- Westfälischer Friedenspreis (2024)

== Publications ==
- Macron, Emmanuel; Goldberg, Jonathan; Scott, Juliette (2017). Revolution. Brunswick, Victoria, Australia: Scribe Publications. ISBN 978-1-925322-71-2. OCLC 992124322.
- ——; Fottorino, Éric (2017). Macron par Macron (in French). La Tour d'Aigues, France: Editions de l'Aube. ISBN 978-2-8159-2484-9. OCLC 1003593124.

== Notes ==
Political offices
Preceded by Jean Castex	Deputy Secretary-General to the President; 2012–2014; Served alongside: Nicolas Revel	Succeeded by Laurence Boone
Preceded by Arnaud Montebourg	Minister of Economics, Industry and Digital Affairs; 2014–2016	Succeeded by Michel Sapin
Preceded by François Hollande	President of France; 2017–present	Incumbent
Party political offices
New political party	President of En Marche; 2016–2017	Succeeded by Catherine Barbaroux
Regnal titles
Preceded by François Hollande	Co-Prince of Andorra; 2017–present Served alongside: Joan Enric Vives Sicília, Josep-Lluís Serrano Pentinat	Incumbent
Catholic Church titles
Preceded by François Hollande	Honorary Canon of the Papal Basilicas of St. John Lateran and St. Peter; 2017–present	Incumbent
Diplomatic posts
Preceded by Justin Trudeau	Chair of the Group of Seven; 2019	Succeeded by Boris Johnson (2021)
Preceded by Mark Carney	Chair of the Group of Seven; 2026	Incumbent
Order of precedence
First	French order of precedence as President of the Republic	Succeeded by Sébastien Lecornu as Prime Minister
