= Jean de Nynauld =

French physician

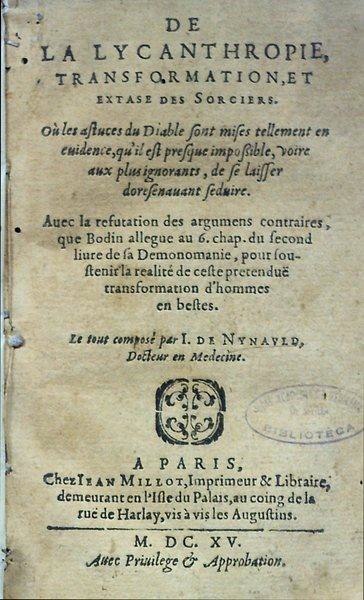
The title page of De la lycanthropie, transformation et extase des sorciers in the library of the Royal Academy of Medicine and Surgery of Seville.

Jean de Nynauld was a French physician who wrote an important work on lycanthropy in 1615 titled De la lycanthropie, transformation et extase des sorciers (On lycanthropy, transformation and ecstasy of witches). de Nynauld saw lycanthropy as a form of mental illness rather than a form of magic.

A critical edition of the work, edited by Nicole Jacques-Lefevre and Maxime Preaud, was published by Frenesie in Paris, 1990. (ISBN 2906225223)
