= Henry Hermand =

French businessman (1924–2016)

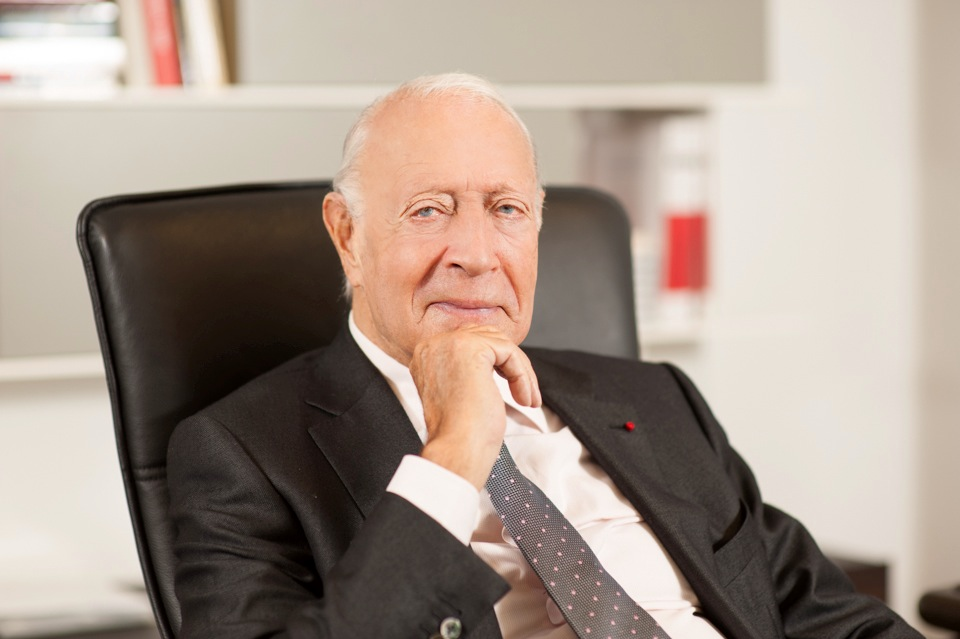
- Henry Hermand in 2014
- Born: 11 July 1924; Clermont, Oise, France
- Died: 6 November 2016 (aged 92); Paris, France
- Education: Lycée Janson de Sailly
- Occupation: Businessman
- Spouse: Béatrice Hermand

Henry Hermand (11 July 1924 – 6 November 2016) was a French businessman, media executive and political adviser. He was the founder of Progest, a developer of shopping centres in Europe, North Africa and Sub-Saharan Africa, which he sold to Klépierre in 2006. He was a co-founder of Terra Nova, a think tank with ties to the Socialist Party. He was also a benefactor and mentor to President Emmanuel Macron.

== Early life ==
Hermand was born on 11 July 1924 in Clermont, Oise, France. His father was a shopkeeper. He was raised as a Roman Catholic.

Hermand was educated at the Lycée Janson de Sailly. He joined the French Resistance during World War II. After the war, his application to the École Polytechnique was rejected. Instead, he earned a bachelor of science.

== Business career ==
Hermand began his career as a physicist at the Commissariat à l’énergie atomique (CEA). He was forced to resign over his political views.

Hermand founded Progest, a developer of shopping centres. He opened his first supermarket in Blanc-Mesnil in 1964. In 1967, he purchased the Saint-Maximin forest from Élie de Rothschild, and turned it into the largest retail park in Picardy by the time it was dedicated in 1969. A year later, when he invited singer Claude François to perform and celebrate its one-year anniversary, 10,000 people attended the concert. Hermand subsequently opened supermarkets and shopping centres in the suburbs of Paris, Europe (including Italy, Spain, the Czech Republic), North Africa (including Morocco), and Sub-Saharan Africa. He often worked with Édouard Leclerc, the founder of the E.Leclerc supermarket chain. In 2006, he sold Progest to Klépierre, a REIT publicly listed on the CAC Next 20.

Hermand founded HH Développement, a property management company, in 2007.

== Political career ==
Hermand joined the Unified Socialist Party, and he became close to Michel Rocard. He became an anti-colonialist and an anti-communist. He joined the board of Esprit, a political review, in the 1950s. He was the chief executive and vice president of Le Matin de Paris from 1985 to 1987. He was a co-founder of Le 1, another newspaper, in 2014.

Hermand was a member of the French Economic and Social Council from 1989 to 1994. He was a donor to La République des Idées, a think tank founded by historian Pierre Rosanvallon in 2002. He was also a co-founder and a donor to Terra Nova, a think tank with ties to the Socialist Party.

Hermand first met Emmanuel Macron when Macron was 25. He soon became Macron's mentor. He loaned €550,000 to Macron when he was Inspector of Finances, which Macron used to purchase his first apartment. In 2007, he was his best man at his wedding to Brigitte Trogneux. In 2016, he let him use offices for En Marche!, Macron's successful bid for the 2017 French presidential election.

Hermand became an officer of the Legion of Honour on 28 June 1993 and a commander on 31 December 2013.

== Personal life and death ==
Hermand resided in Paris and Senlis, Oise. He authored his memoir, L’ambition n’est pas un rêve, in 2010. In 2016, he donated €1 million to the Fondation Georges Cziffra for the purchase of the Collégiale Saint-Frambourg in Senlis. He was worth an estimated €220 million in 2016.

Hermand died on 6 November 2016 in Paris. He was 92.

== Works ==
- Hermand, Henry (2010). L'ambition n'est pas un rêve. Paris: Editions du Seuil. ISBN 9782021035537. OCLC 717636637.
