= Nicole Jacques-Lefèvre =

French literary professor

Nicole Jacques-Lefevre, also known as Nicole Jacques-Chaquin, is a Professor of Literature at the University of Picardie Jules Verne who specialises in the study of demonological texts of the Enlightenment in the eighteenth century including werewolves and lycanthropy.

In 1990, with Maxime Preaud, she produced a critical edition of Jean de Nynauld's 1615 work, De la lycanthropie, transformation et extase des sorciers (On lycanthropy, transformation and ecstasy of witches). (Frenesie, Paris, 1990. ISBN 2906225223)

== Selected publications ==
- Les sorciers du carroi de Marlou: Un procès de sorcellerie en Berry, 1582-1583. Grenoble: J. Millon, 1996. ISBN 2841370437 (With Maxime Préaud)
- Louis-Claude de Saint-Martin, le philosophe inconnu (1743-1803). Paris: Dervy, 2003. ISBN 2844542263
- Écriture, identité, anonymat au XVIIIe siècle. Nanterre: Université Paris X-Nanterre, 2006. ISBN 290490638X (With Marie Leca-Tsiomis)
