= Jean-Michel Macron =

French doctor and professor of neurology (born 1950)

- Born: Jean-Michel Frédéric Macron; 30 June 1950 (age 75); Saint-Denis, Réunion
- Known for: Professor of neurology at the University of Picardy
- Spouses: Françoise Noguès (divorced); Hélène Joly
- Children: 4, including Emmanuel
- Relatives: Brigitte Macron (daughter-in-law)

Jean-Michel Frédéric Macron (French pronunciation: [ʒɑ̃ miʃɛl fʁedeʁik makʁɔ̃]; born 30 June 1950) is a French doctor and professor of neurology at the University of Picardy. He is the father of French President Emmanuel Macron.

== Early life ==
Jean-Michel Macron was born in 1950. His father was André Macron (1920–2010), a railway executive, and his mother was Jacqueline Macron (1922–1998), née Robertson, of half English origin. He wrote a thesis on feline neurology in 1981.

== Career ==
Macron is a professor of neurology at the University of Picardy, specializing in sleep disorders and epilepsy.

Macron has published in academic journals such as Neuroscience Letters, Brain Research, NeuroReport and Neurosurgery on sneezing in cats. Macron has 26 publications as author or co-author in the PubMed database.

== Personal life ==
Jean-Michel Macron was first married to Françoise Noguès, a physician based in Amiens. She is the daughter of Jean Noguès and his wife Germaine Noguès (née Arribet, died 2013), both teachers. The first child of Jean-Michel and Françoise Macron died as an infant. They then had three children: Emmanuel (born 1977; the current President of France), Laurent (born 1979), and Estelle (born 1982).

After the divorce of Jean-Michel and Françoise Macron, Jean-Michel Macron married Hélène Joly, a psychiatrist at the Centre Hospitalier Philippe Pinel in Dury, Somme.
