= Pablo Martín Asuero =

Spanish scholar

Pablo Martín Asuero (born San Sebastián, 1967) is a Spanish scholar from the Basque Country. He specialises in Middle Eastern history, and has directed the Cervantes Institute in Istanbul and Damascus.

== Education ==
Martín Asuero graduated from Sandia Preparatory High School in Albuquerque, New Mexico and studied Hispanic Philology at the University of Deusto (Spain). From 1991 to 1993 he learned Turkish at the University of Istanbul, having been awarded a scholarship from the Foreign Ministry of Spain. He obtained his Ph.D. in 1997 from the University of the Basque Country (Spain) with a thesis Constantinopla 1783-1916. La imagen española de Estambul durante la cuestión de Oriente directed by Jon Juaristi.

== Career ==
A year after graduation, Martín Asuero began working for the Spanish General Consulate as a teacher of Spanish at the Istanbul Technical University, and later as maître de langue at the University of Picardie Jules Verne in Beauvais (France). In 2000 he was appointed as a teacher at the Instituto Cervantes in Beirut (Lebanon). Two years later he was appointed director of the Cervantes Institute in Istanbul until 2007, then at the Cervantes Institute in Damascus, and from September 2012 until August 2017 he was again Director of the Cervantes Institute of Istanbul , then he went back to Lebanon until 2021. At the present he is based in San Sebastián, Spain.

Martín Asuero has been editor of the proceedings of several conferences related to the Sephardim, the relations between Spain and the Ottoman Empire, and literature written by diplomats. He is an adviser for the Cuadernos del Bósforo for the Isis Press in Istanbul (Turkey). His works have been translated into English, French, Turkish, Arabic, Serbian and Catalan.

== Awards ==
Pablo Martín Asuero is an honorary member of the Asociación Española de Orientalistas. He has been inducted into the Order of Civil Merit and the Order of Isabella the Catholic in Spain and the Order of Merit given by the Chilean government.

== Works ==
=== Books ===
- Mavi sütunlu saray, Ankara, Dost, 2003.
- Estambul, el ejército otomano y los sefardíes, Istanbul, Isis, 2003.
- España y el Líbano 1788-1910. Viajeros, diplomáticos, peregrinos e intelectuales, Madrid, Miraguano, 2003.
- Descripción del Damasco otomano (1807-1920), según las crónicas de viajeros españoles e hispanoamericanos, Madrid, Miraguano, 2004.
- Viajeros hispánicos en Estambul Istanbul, Isis, 2005.
- Descripción del Egipto otomano, según las crónicas de viajeros españoles, hispanoamericanos y otros textos, Madrid, Miraguano, 2007.
- El Consulado de España en Estambul y la protección de sefardíes entre 1804 y 1930, Istanbul, Isis, 2011.
- Representantes españoles en la legación española en Estambul 1833-1930, Saarbrücken, Alemania, Editorial Académica Española, 2016.
- Jefes de misión de la legación de España en Estambul 1779-1930, London, Editorial Académica Española, 2025. Heads of Mission of the Spanish Legation in Istanbul 1779-1930, London, Our Knowledge Publishing, 2025.Chefs de mission de la légation espagnole à Istanbul 1779-1930, London, Editions Notre Savoir, 2025. Chefes de Missão da Legação de Espanha em Istambul 1779-1930, London, Ediçoes Nosso Conhecimiento, 2025.Capi missione della legazione spagnola a Istanbul 1779-1930, London, Sapienza, 2025.Szefowie misji hiszpańskiego poselstwa w Stambule 1779-1930, London, Widawnictwo Nazawiedza, 2025. Missionschefs der spanischen Gesandtschaft in Istanbul 1779-1930, London, Verlag Unser Wissen, 2025.

=== Chapters in books ===
- "Le Voyage en Orient de Lamartine, sa traduction en espagnole et son influence sur les auteurs hispaniques" en DURUSOY Gertrude (ed) Actes du colloque international sur Lamartine. Izmir, 2004 pp 189–194.
- "El reencuentro de los españoles con los sefardíes de Estambul (1784-1915)", in Expresiones de la identidad de las tres culturas Murcia 2005, Universidad de Murcia, 2005 pp 15–26.
- "Ispanya-Türkiye 1700-1923", Pablo Martín Asuero (ed) in İspanya-Türkiye 16. Yüzyıldan 21. Yüzyıla Rekabet Ve Dostluk Istanbul, Kitap Yayinevi, 2006, pp 261–274.
- "Los diplomáticos españoles y el redescubrimiento del Imperio Otomano" in the Catálogo de la exposición La aventura española en Oriente [1166-2006]. Madrid, Ministerio de Cultura, 2006. pp 133–142.
- "Ispanyol seyyahatlarin gözüyle inperatorlugun deniz kiyisindan baskenti Istanbul 1784-1916" Özlem Kumrular (ed)in Türkler ve Deniz, Istanbul, Kitap Yayinevi, 2007, pp 467–478.
- "Ispanyol seyyahalari gözüyle Istanbul (1784-1915), in Las relaciones turco-españolas a lo largo de la historia Tarih bocunya Türk-Ispanyol iliskileri, Madrid, Embajada de Turquía, 2008, pp 73-85.
- -“The count of Ballobar and the Consulate of Spain in Jerusalem during World War I”, in The International Colloquium, al-Quds in History on the Occasion of al-Quds the Araba Capital of Culture 2009, Damascus, Ministry of Culture, 2009, pp. 25–33.
- "la lucha contra el turco, de los almogávares a Lepanto" in Los enemigos de España : imagen del otro, conflictos bélicos y disputas nacionales, siglos XVI-XX : actas del IV Coloquio Internacional de Historia Política, 5-6 de junio de 200 in Xosé M Núñez Seixas; Francisco Sevillano Calero; Jaime Contreras (Eds), Madrid : Centro de Estudios Políticos y Constitucionales, 2010. pp 89–116.
- "The New Image of the Turks in Some Late 18th Century Spanish texts" Keyfi Kenan (ed) Erken klasik dönemden XVIII Yüzyıl sonuna kadar Osmanlılar ve Avrupa, seyahat, Karşılaşma ve etkileşim. The Ottomans and Europe. Travel, encounters and interaction (from the early classical period until the end of the 18th Century. Istanbul, İslâm Araştırmaları Merkezi (İSAM) 2010, pp 563–576.
- "Le Liban vu par les voyageurs, diplomates, pèlerins et intellectuels espagnols (1860 -1910)" Salim Daccache, Carla Edde, Stefan Knost, Bruno Paoli et Souad Slim (Sous la direction de) Cohabitation et conflits dans le Bilâd al-Châm à l’époque ottomane musulmans et chrétiens à travers les écrits des chroniqueurs et des voyageurs Beyrouth, University of Balamand - Ifpo - Université Saint-Joseph - Orient Institut (Beirut), 2014. pp 153–170.
- "Hispanic observers of Istanbul" Herzog, CHristoph and Wittman, Richard, (Eds) Istanbul-Kushta-Constantinople, Narratives of identity in the Ottoman Capital 1830-1930 Routledge, LOndon and New York, 2019, pp. 91–101.

=== Edited publications ===
- Actas del congreso internacional España-Turquía, del enfrentamiento al análisis mutuo, organizado por el Instituto Cervantes de Estambul (31 de octubre al 2 de noviembre del 2002), Istanbul, Isis, 2003.
- Diego de Coello y Quesada y la Cuestión de Oriente (1882-1897), Artículos sobre Turquía, Egipto, Sudán, Rumania, Serbia, Bulgaria, Grecia y los patriarcas orientales. Istanbul, Isis, 2003
- Adolfo de Mentaberry, Impresiones de un viaje a la China, Madrid, Miraguano, 2008.
- Antonio de Zayas, A orillas del Bósforo, Madrid, Miraguano, 2022.en Miraguano Ediciones)

=== Co-edited publications ===
- MARTIN ASUERO Pablo, YAYCIOGLU Mukkader & TOLEDO Paulino: Cervantes y el Mediterráneo hispano-otomano. Estambul, Isis, 2006.
- BERNARDINI Michele, SANCHEZ Encarnación & MARTIN ASUERO Pablo: España y el Oriente árabo-musulmán (Actas del congreso organizado por la Universidad l’Orientale de Nápoles y el Instituto Cervantes de Nápoles en octubre de 2004) Estambul, Isis, 2007.
- MARTIN ASUERO Pablo & GERSON ŞARHON Karen: Ayer y hoy de la prensa en judeoespañol Actas del simposio organizado por el Instituto Cervantes de Estambul en colaboración con el Sentro de Investigasiones Sovre la Cultura Sefardi Otomana Turka los días 29 y 30 de abril de 2007, Istanbul, Isis, 2007.
- BADENAS DE LA PEÑA, Pedro & MARTIN ASUERO Pablo: Carlos Ibáñez de Ibero Grandchamp D'Athènes à Constantinople, La situation politique en Orient , 2015, Istanbul, Isis.
- BADENAS DE LA PEÑA, Pedro & MARTIN ASUERO Pablo: Carlos Ibáñez de Ibero De Atenas a Constantinopla: La situación política en Oriente (otoño-invierno de 1914-1915) 2016, Madrid, Marcial Pons.

=== Articles on line ===
- Los poetas Turcos y la batalla de Gallipoli
- Balat y Hasköy: Dos barrios judíos de Estambul a la luz de varios observadores españoles (1784-1905)
- El Consulado de España en Estambul y la protección de sefardíes (1804-1913)
- The Spanish Consulate in Istanbul and the Protection of the Sephardim (1804-1913)
- El encuentro de los españoles con los sefardíes de Marruecos a la luz de Pedro de Alarcón
- El viaje a oriente de Lamartine, su traducción al español e influencia en autores hispánicos
- Catalina de Oviedo y Murat III; lo que pudo ser y no fue
- Estambul, el premio Nobel y el Cervantes
