= University of Picardy Jules Verne =

Public university based in northern France

Coordinates: 49°52′36″N 2°15′53″E

- Université de Picardie Jules Verne
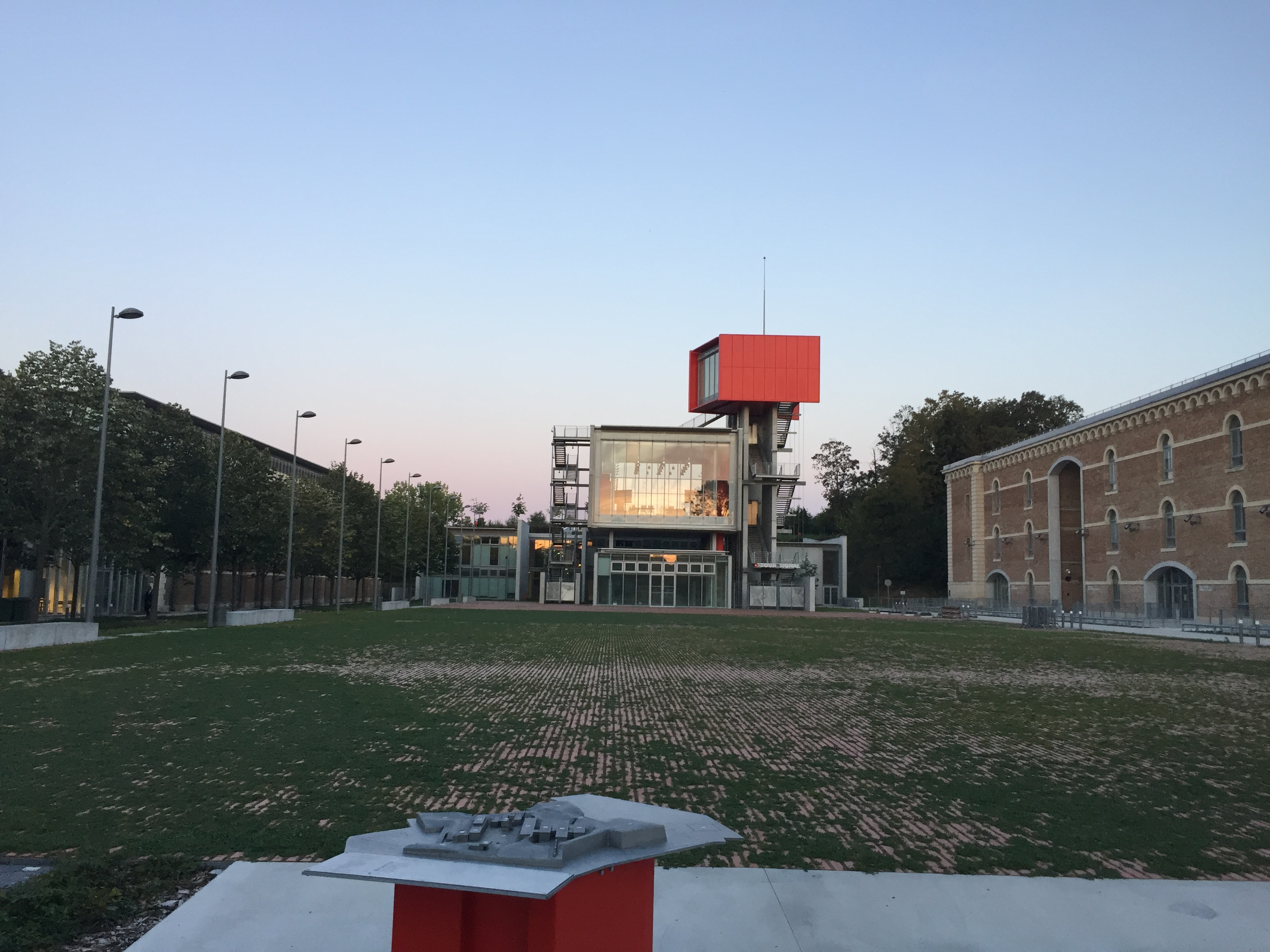
- La citadelle d’Amiens
- Type: Public
- Established: 1970
- Affiliations: AUF, COMUE Lille Nord de France, EUA
- President: Denis Postel
- Faculty: 1,200 professors and researchers
- Students: 32,000
- Location: Amiens; Beauvais; Cuffies-Soissons; Saint-Quentin; Creil; Laon, Hauts-de-France, France
- Campus: Urban
- Website: U-picardie.fr
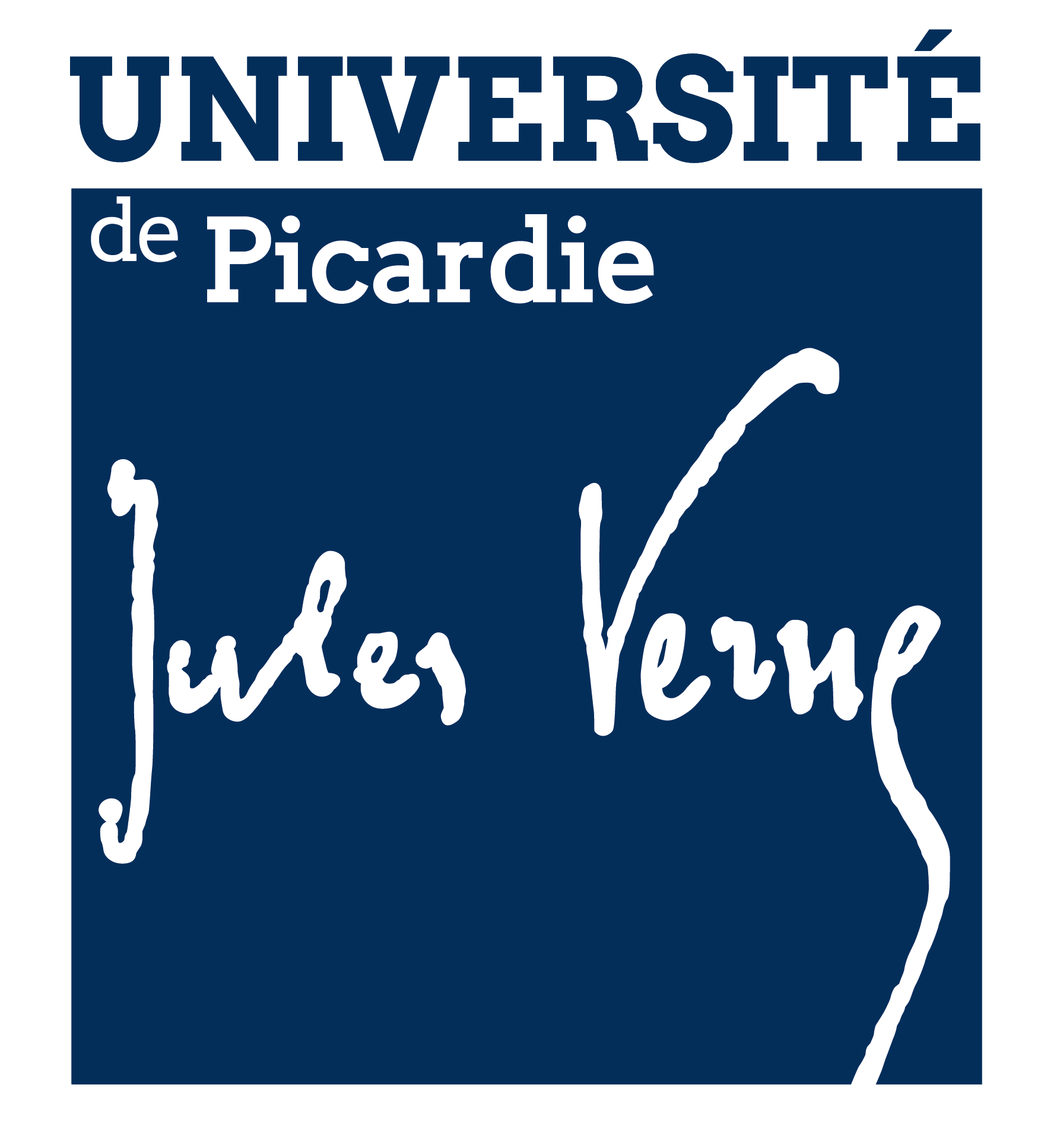

The University of Picardy Jules Verne (French: Université de Picardie Jules Verne; UPJV) is a public university located in the former Picardy region of France (now part of Hauts-de-France).

It consists of several campuses located in the towns of Amiens, Beauvais, Cuffies, Saint-Quentin, Creil, and Laon.

The university was part of the University of Lille Nord de France group.

== History ==
The University of Picardy Jules Verne was established in 1970 as a successor to the former University of Amiens. It was initially simply called the University of Picardy during its first two decades, until 1991 when writer Jules Verne's named was added. Verne spent much of his life in Amiens. What started as a small university now has over 30,000 students across all campuses. The university celebrated its 50th anniversary in 2019–2020.

== Organisation ==
The university is organised into five main faculties or groupings each with a number of schools or institutes:

=== Arts, Literature, Languages ===
- UFR Arts
- UFR Languages and foreign cultures
- UFR Literature

=== Law, Economics, Management ===
- UFR Law and Political Science
- UFR Economics and Management
- Institut d'Administration des Entreprises (IAE)
- Institut de Préparation à l'Administration Générale (IPAG)

=== ESPE, Antenne et IUT ===
- Antenne Universitaire de Beauvais (AUB)
- École Supérieure du Professorat et de l'Éducation (ESPE)
- Institut Universitaire de Technologie d'Amiens
- Institut Universitaire de Technologie de l'Aisne
- Institut Universitaire de Technologie de l'Oise

=== Sciences Humaines et Sociales ===
- UFR d'Histoire et de Géographie
- UFR Sciences Humaines, Sociales et Philosophie

=== Ingénierie, Sciences, Technologie, Santé ===
- École d'ingénieurs Jules Verne (EIJV)
- UFR de Médecine
- Institut d'Ingénierie de la Santé - 2IS
- UFR de Pharmacie
- UFR des Sciences
- UFR des Sciences et Techniques des Activités Physiques et Sportives - STAPS
- Institut Supérieur des Sciences et Techniques - INSSET

== Notable faculty ==
- Jacqueline Lévi-Valensi (1932–2004) - specialist in the work of Albert Camus
- Andrée Ehresmann (born 1935) - mathematician specialising in category theory
- Nadine-Josette Chaline (born 1938) - specialist in religious history
- Jean-Michel Macron (born 1950) - neurologist; father of Emmanuel Macron
- Jean-Marie Tarascon (born 1953) - chemist
- Brigitte Fouré (born 1955) - university lecturer and former government minister
- Laurence Bertrand Dorléac (born 1957) - art historian
- Enzo Traverso (born 1957) - Italian scholar of European intellectual history
- Nikolay Nenovsky (born 1963) - Bulgarian economist, working in the fields of monetary theory and policy, monetary history and history of economic thought
- Pablo Martín Asuero (born 1967) - Spanish scholar from the Basque Country. He specialises in Middle Eastern history
- Alain Bui (born 1969) - specialist in information technology; president of Versailles Saint-Quentin-en-Yvelines University
- Fabien Danesi - art historian
- Nicole Jacques-Lefevre - Professor of Literature who specialises in the study of demonological texts of the Enlightenment in the eighteenth century including werewolves and lycanthropy
- Jean-Paul Cointet - historian
- Didier Eribon - philosopher

== Notable alumni ==
- Daniel Ona Ondo (born 1945) - Gabonese politician who was Prime Minister of Gabon from January 2014 to September 2016
- Calliope Spanou - Greek academic who served from 2011 to 2015 as the Greek Ombudsman

== See also ==
- List of colleges and universities
- List of public universities in France by academy
- Amiens
