= List of presidents of RATP =

This article is a list of the presidents of RATP, i.e. the presidents of the board of directors and CEOs of RATP.

Date of nomination	Source	Name
27 December 1948		Georges Ricroch
5 January 1951		Georges Ricroch
31 December 1952		Georges Ricroch
18 January 1955		Georges Ricroch
23 January 1957		Georges Ricroch
23 September 1959		Pierre Massenet
14 March 1964		Roger Belin
8 February 1973		Roger Belin
7 February 1979		Roger Belin
7 August 1981		Claude Quin
25 June 1984		Claude Quin
19 June 1986		Paul Reverdy
22 February 1989		Christian Blanc
29 June 1989		Christian Blanc
1 July 1992		Christian Blanc
11 December 1992		Francis Lorentz
21 June 1994		Jean-Paul Bailly
24 June 1999		Jean-Paul Bailly
25 September 2002		Anne-Marie Idrac
26 July 2004		Anne-Marie Idrac
12 July 2006		Pierre Mongin
29 July 2009		Pierre Mongin
23 July 2014		Pierre Mongin
21 May 2015		Élisabeth Borne
2 August 2017		Catherine Guillouard
28 November 2022		Jean Castex
