= Electricity market in France =

The electricity market in France comprises the organizational forms of the electricity production and marketing sector, which has been undergoing a process of economic liberalization since the late 1990s.

Following on from a public monopoly supplying electricity at administered rates, the creation of the electricity market in France spans a quarter of a century, from the preparatory work of the European Commission in the 1980s to the law on the new organization of the electricity market (NOME law) in December 2010.

Key legislative changes have included the restructuring of the state-owned company Électricité de France (EDF). These changes ended EDF's monopoly on electricity generation and supply, introduced partial privatization by opening up its capital, and facilitated access to the transmission network for other market participants.

Additionally, new regulatory institutions were established, such as the Commission de Régulation de l'Energie (CRE) and the Médiateur National de l'Energie (National Energy Mediator), to oversee the sector and address consumer issues. The overall organization of electricity markets has also been increasingly aligned with European Union regulations.

== History ==
The Energy Code, established in 2011, consolidates existing laws related to energy across all its forms. Since its creation, the Code has been continuously updated to address various issues, including consumer protection, securing electricity supply, and overseeing new technologies.

In October 2012, the Treaty on the Functioning of the European Union (TFEU) ruled that energy and trans-European energy transport networks would henceforth be a shared competence between the European Union and its member states.

=== Public monopoly from 1946 to 1997 ===
France, on the eve of EDF's nationalization, electricity was generated by 86 thermal power plants and 300 hydroelectric plants, owned by 54 and 100 private companies respectively. Transmission networks were shared between 86 companies. As for electricity distribution, 1,150 companies managed the market.

Law no. 46-628, passed on April 8, 1946 on the nationalization of electricity production, transmission, distribution, import, and export, was primarily intended to promote economic reform by “[ousting] the great economic and financial feudalities from the direction of the economy [and] returning to the nation the great means of monopolized production, the fruits of common labor, energy sources and subsoil riches”.

EDF was given financial autonomy, as well as technical and commercial independence. For its financial and accounting management, it followed the rules used in industrial and commercial companies and was subject to taxation.

Since then, the management of national and distribution services has been conducted in such a way as to meet all operating, capital, and investment expenses.

In addition to EDF, the 1946 nationalization law recognized the right of communes wishing to do so to retain a role in the public distribution of electricity, by maintaining the status quo of distribution networks operated by public utilities.

In 2023, some 140 local distribution companies (ELD) were responsible for distribution in around 5% of France, in areas not served by Enedis.

During the period of EDF's monopoly, the roles of distribution and commercial supply to end customers were unified.

In short, EDF was responsible for generation, transmission on the main grids, distribution and commercial supply to end customers, while local electricity distribution companies, where present, were responsible for local generation, distribution, and commercial supply. EDF was also responsible, under government supervision, for the forward-looking development of electricity production and consumption.

From 1946 to 1997, there were no significant legislative changes.

=== 1980 to 1996: Legislative preparation by the European Community ===
As early as the 1980s, the European Commission was studying the possibilities of opening up the electricity market to competition, for the following reasons:

- the competitive imperatives of the European common market enshrined in the 1957 Treaty of Rome;
- the separation in Community law between, on the one hand, the missions of service of general economic interest (SGEI) and, on the other, the operators entrusted with these missions.

During this period, while Great Britain opened up the electricity sector to competition with the Electricity Act 1989, with the aim of bringing supply prices closer into line with production costs, stimulating innovation and obtaining an optimal production fleet, France, relying on the fact that an exception to the applicability of competition rules was allowed in the event of incompatibility with the fulfilment of a public service mission, maintained an integrated monopoly, preventing any new entrant from developing competition in electricity production and marketing. This was interpreted as a barrier to intra-Community trade.

In 1989, the Commission published several reports on the transparency of energy prices for industrial consumers. In addition to price transparency, these reports aimed to identify any unauthorized state aid.

In the early 1990s, the European approach was unexpectedly strengthened by the successful opening up of the UK electricity market to competition, which was accompanied by falling prices on wholesale markets, whetting the appetite of European industrialists who saw cost-cutting opportunities.

This led to Directive 90/377/EEC on the transparency of electricity prices charged to large industrial consumers and Directive 90/547/EEC on the transit of electricity through grids in the Member States.

Since the Amsterdam Treaty of 1997, the European Commission has no longer considered services of general economic interest as a possible exception to the applicability of competition rules.

Consequently, considering that the preliminary conditions for opening up a European electricity market had been met, the Parliament and Council of the European Union adopted Directive 96/92/EC in December 1996 to organize the unification of the internal electricity market by giving consumers the right to choose their supplier.

This directive also defines the essential principle for putting generated electricity onto the grid: economic precedence or merit order, as “merit order” is very commonly used. This principle means that, to meet demand, generating facilities are called according to the increasing cost of the megawatt-hour produced; the higher the cost, the less the generating facility will be called. And, for a given time slot, all the electricity produced, whatever its production cost, is sold at the marginal cost, which is the highest cost. This principle has been maintained in successive changes to the directive until September 2023.

However, in October 2023, the Council of the EU proposed that it be replaced by a system of sharing the risk of wholesale price variations between producers and member states. In November 2023, this proposal remains to be approved by the European Parliament.

Directive 96/92/EC and its counterpart on the internal market for natural gas make up the commission's first energy package.

=== 2000 to 2006: Transposition of European directives ===
To align with the aforementioned EU directives, France undertook significant legislative reforms in the electricity sector, beginning with Law 2000-108 of February 10, 2000, which aimed at modernizing and developing the public electricity service. This law:

- defined the notion of “public electricity service”, previously implicit, as having “the purpose of guaranteeing the supply of electricity throughout the national territory, in the public interest”, and explain the related missions, the operators responsible for them, the involvement of public authorities, the methods for setting electricity tariffs for customers not eligible for market offers, and the contributions of electricity producers to the costs attributable to public service missions;
- defined the principles for programming and issuing operating authorizations for production facilities, the organization of calls for tenders for the construction of new facilities, the terms and conditions of EDF's obligation to purchase small-scale production, and the opportunities granted to municipalities to build small-scale facilities and sell their production;
- defined the management and missions of the public electricity transmission service, as well as the terms and conditions of access to this transmission network. EDF RTE (Réseau de transport d'électricité) was designated as the operator;
- maintained the existing organization for the public distribution of electricity to end customers. EDF and the 150 or so non-nationalized distributors, as well as the concession-granting authorities, kept their roles unchanged;
- defined the conditions for opening up to competition, eligibility, and choice of supplier;
- defined the conditions for direct network access by new players;
- imposed the separation of generation, transmission and distribution accounts in EDF's internal accounting system;
- created a regulatory authority, the Commission de régulation de l'électricité (CRE), and define its missions and powers;
- authorized EDF to extend its traditional activities to others that contribute directly or indirectly to them - in 2023, the EDF Group had holdings in 263 companies in 12 countries- with the exception of domestic and industrial installations, and authorize EDF to carry out any activity abroad.

In addition, the consumption eligibility thresholds, set in accordance with Directive 96/92/EC, authorizing access to the competitive electricity market, met with great success and were rapidly lowered in member states, encouraging the commission to accelerate this opening-up by positioning new thresholds closer in time.

A second “energy package” was therefore adopted by the Commission on June 26, 2003:

- Directive 2003/54/EC opening up the electricity markets to new suppliers and giving all consumers the freedom to choose their suppliers;
- Regulation (EC) no. 1228/2003 on conditions for access to the network for cross-border exchanges in electricity.

In France, Law 2004-803 of August 9, 2004, on the public electricity service and electricity companies implemented several key reforms to align with European directives:

- assigns public service missions to EDF and local distribution companies (ELD). The possibility of EDF and GDF sharing common services is confirmed. Under article 5, the creation of a joint service is compulsory in the distribution sector for the construction of facilities, project management, network operation and maintenance, metering operations and other tasks relating to these activities;
- decides to split EDF into two separate companies, one responsible for generation and supply, EDF in this case, and the other for electricity transmission, Réseau de transport d'électricité (RTE), created in 2000. RTE was transformed into a subsidiary of the EDF Group, while its capital remained wholly owned by public bodies, including EDF;
- authorizes RTE to manage other networks in France and abroad;
- transfers ownership of EDF's electricity transmission assets to RTE;
- requires companies distributing electricity to more than 100,000 customers to set up a department to manage this distribution;
- transforms EDF into a limited company and opens up 30% of its capital.

Law 2006-1537 of December 7, 2006 on the energy sector amends the above-mentioned laws of 2000 and 2004, as well as various articles in the local authority, consumer affairs, labor and employment codes:

- establishes the principle of eligibility for all end consumers, including domestic consumers;
- establishes a national energy ombudsman responsible for recommending solutions to disputes between consumers and electricity suppliers, and helping to inform electricity consumers of their rights;
- introduced a transitional regulated market adjustment tariff (TaRTAM) for two years. This tariff was intended to protect customers from a sharp rise in electricity prices, and was to be replaced by future provisions in the “NOME” law.

In France in 2007, the situation was as follows:

- any industrial company with adequate financial and technical capacity could build and operate an electricity-generating facility, after obtaining the requisite administrative authorizations;
- all customers could choose their electricity supplier;
- the transmission and distribution networks, while retaining public monopoly status, were subject to regulation in line with European directives.

On November 30, 2006, the French Constitutional Council ruled that the French aid system was incompatible with EU law, while the same year, the European authorities initiated infringement proceedings against France for failure to transpose Directive 2003/54 and opened a State aid investigation into the regulated tariffs for the sale of electricity to industrial customers and the TaRTAM.

=== 2007 to 2011: hectic drafting of the NOME law ===
Various reports, in particular that of the Champsaur Commission on the organization of the electricity market (April 2009) and the impact study on the draft law on the new organization of the electricity market (April 2010), reviewed the recent history of price trends in France and other countries:

- French production, 90% of which is nuclear and hydroelectric, emits very little CO2 and supplies electricity at very competitive prices;
- until 2005, market prices were lower than regulated sales tariffs. In that year, the reduction of excess production capacity, rising fuel prices and the introduction of the Emissions Trading Scheme led to a sharp rise in market prices, while electricity production costs in France were not sensitive to these causes;
- in neighboring countries, and Germany in particular, in line with the economic theory of the Pareto optimum, the market price was set, according to the principle of economic precedence, by the most expensive generation unit;
- network interconnection meant that the principle of price formation, economic precedence, had to be extended to France;
- ultimately, in France, moderate production costs are no longer reflected in market prices, and consumers who have opted for market prices are subject to significant price rises, hence the introduction of TaRTAM to protect them;
- in France, TaRTAM and regulatory uncertainties discouraged new suppliers from entering the competitive market.

At this point, a new law on the organization of the French electricity market had to be passed.

On April 23, 2009, the European Union published Directive 2009/28/EC, which revised the order in which generation facilities are called onto the grid, giving priority to production from renewable energy sources, irrespective of their production cost.

A third “energy package” was issued on July 13, 2009:

- regulation 713/2009 set up an Agency for the Cooperation of Energy Regulators (ACER) to help national regulatory authorities exercise and coordinate their regulatory tasks at European level and, where necessary, complement their actions;
- Regulation 714/2009 on conditions for access to the network for cross-border exchanges in electricity;
- Directive 2009/72/EC, concerning common rules for the internal market in electricity in the EU, repealed Directive 2003/54/EC.

This package introduced the unbundling of power generation, transmission network operation and supply to end customers (Note: This was tantamount to banning an integrated company like EDF.) and strengthened consumer rights on retail markets. It was the cornerstone of the implementation of the internal energy market.

=== Gradual liberalization ===
Successive decrees have gradually lowered the consumption threshold in France for access to the competitive market:

- February 1999: eligibility of sites consuming more than 100 GWh;
- June 2000: eligibility for all sites consuming more than 16 GWh (a market opening rate of more than 30%);
- February 2003: any site consuming more than 7 GWh is eligible;
- July 2004: eligibility for businesses and local authorities;
- July 2007: eligibility for all consumers (including residential customers);
- November 1, 2014: new method for calculating regulated tariffs;
- January 1, 2016: end of regulated tariffs for customers with a contract power greater than 36 kVA.

=== New organization of the electricity market ===
On December 7, 2010, French law 2010-1488 was enacted, introducing a new organization for the electricity market, the main provisions of which:

- introduce a transitional system of regulated access to historical nuclear electricity (ARENH), to encourage the development of competition with EDF. This obligation enables electricity suppliers who so request to supply end consumers in mainland France;
- require each electricity supplier to have guaranteed supply capacity to meet the balance between production and consumption in mainland France. The capacity of a generation facility or consumption curtailment capacity is certified by a contract between the supplier and RTE. The capacity obligation mechanism takes into account the interconnection of the French market with other European markets;
- introduce a new method for calculating regulated electricity sales tariffs;
- set December 31, 2015 as the end date for regulated electricity tariffs for large and medium-sized businesses (green and yellow tariffs);
- introduce a tax on final electricity consumption to be paid by suppliers to municipalities and départements.

The passage of this law, which came into force on December 8, 2010, put an end to the state aid investigation opened by the European Commission in 2007. TaRTAM was abolished in July 2011.

In view of the dispersal of existing texts and recent major amendments, Ordinance 2011-504 of May 9, 2011 ratified the creation of an Energy Code compiling all the articles still in force from the laws framing the electricity sector from 1906 to 2010, including Law 2010-1488.

Since then, the Code has undergone a number of changes on various subjects, such as ARENH, capacity guarantees, and the 2023 version now covers all energies (electricity, gas, hydro, oil and other liquid fuels, heating and cooling networks, hydrogen) as well as energy management and the development of renewable energies. In the decade from 2010 to 2020, it incorporated climate transition imperatives and, more recently, reduced dependence on foreign energy resources.

=== Finalizing integration into trans-European markets and networks - 2012 ===
On October 26, 2012, the Treaty on the Functioning of the European Union (TFEU) was ratified, Article 4 of which stipulates that energy and trans-European energy networks are now a shared competence between the EU and its member states.

Since that date, the French electricity markets have been completely reorganized around the introduction of competition between producers and the freedom of consumers to choose their supplier, with network regulation organized at European Union level and market competition principles defined at EU level. As a result, the French electricity system has become intertwined with the European electricity system.

=== Impact of the 2020 health crisis ===
In March 2020, EDF and its competitors were confronted with the sharp drop in electricity demand caused by the containment measures applied in response to the COVID-19 pandemic and the resulting fall in wholesale electricity market prices.

On the EPEX SPOT wholesale market, on April 13, 2020, at 3 p.m., France still under health confinement experienced a negative price all day, and EDF had to grant its wholesale customers a negative electricity price peak of around -€75/MWh. This meant that electricity buyers were paid by sellers to take their electricity. Negative prices on the wholesale market are events that occur from time to time when there is an overproduction of electricity in Europe. When the spot price, even a positive one, falls below the ARENH price (e.g. to €42/MWh), EDF loses revenue, as non-contracted alternative suppliers switch to the EPEX SPOT market. Alternative suppliers who have signed supply contracts with EDF at the ARENH price must continue to buy at this price, which causes them additional costs.

In early 2020, alternative suppliers brought the COVID-19 health crisis before the Conseil d'Etat to obtain a better price. On April 17, 2020, the Conseil d'État rejected the application for interim relief lodged by two associations of energy suppliers, ruling that it had not been established that the losses suffered by the suppliers concerned would be “of such a magnitude as to jeopardize (...) their survival within a few months” and that “these losses would have such an effect within the time necessary for the competent judge to rule on the claims referred to him”.

TotalEnergies requested that the force majeure clause in its ARENH purchase contracts be invoked; EDF refused, considering the request “opportunistic” and pointing out that Total was paying dividends to its shareholders despite the health crisis. On May 20, 2020, the Paris Commercial Court orders EDF to stop opposing the suspension of the regulated access to historical nuclear electricity contract with TotalEnergies, pointing out that the ARENH contract refers to “neither the intrinsic solidity of the contractor nor its membership of a group deemed powerful”. EDF wishes to appeal “in order to obtain a ruling on the merits” (three other alternative suppliers have obtained the same ruling, including Gazel, owned by Czech Daniel Křetínský, freeing them from ARENH prices on grounds of force majeure).

As Alpiq, Gazel and TotalEnergies had suspended their contracts on the grounds that “the health crisis constituted a case of force majeure to suspend these contracts”, on June 2, 2020, EDF notified them of the termination of their nuclear power purchase contracts at the ARENH price, on the grounds of “suspension (...) beyond a period of two months”, in accordance with the clause provided for in the said contracts93. In November, 2020, EDF won its appeal against TotalEnergies.

=== Global energy crisis 2021-2022 ===
Faced with a sharp rise in wholesale electricity prices, the government undertakes at the end of September 2021 to cap the increase in the regulated sales tariff (TRV) at 4%, whereas it would have been 35% if no government measure had been taken. He decided to reduce the main tax on electricity, the domestic consumption tax on electricity (TICFE), from €22.50/MWh to €50 cents, the minimum authorized by Brussels, at a cost of €8 billion to the State budget. It requires EDF to increase by 20 TWh the volume of nuclear electricity sold at reduced prices to its competitors, raising it exceptionally from 100 to 120 TWh. The measure is expected to cost EDF between €7.7 and €8.4 billion. EDF CEO Jean-Bernard Lévy sees it as “state aid in favor of [his] competitors”.

At the end of January 2022, all the group's unions called a strike to protest against these measures. They were opposed to the government's decision, announced on January 13, to oblige EDF to sell more nuclear electricity at low prices to its competitors, under the ARENH scheme. This decision obliges EDF to buy expensive electricity on the wholesale markets for 2022, which it will have to resell at a much lower rate (€46.20) to its competitors. The operation is expected to cost the company around €3 billion. It will also force it to moderate the increase applied to its own customers, which the company estimates will result in a €5 billion shortfall (€3 billion according to other sources).

On August 2, 2022, MPs and Senators, meeting in a joint commission to finalize the law on purchasing power, voted to freeze the ARENH ceiling at 120 TWh/year, and to raise the sale price to EDF's competitors to €49.5/MWh. This price had previously been €42/MWh and the ARENH ceiling 100 TWh/year, but an ARENH supplement of 20 TWh/year at a price of €46.20/MWh had been imposed on EDF at the start of 2022. However, the parliamentarians' decision was conditional on the agreement of the European Commission.

On January 21, 2024, Economy Minister Bruno Le Maire announced a partial restoration of the domestic final consumption tax on electricity (TICFE) from February 1, 2024. This tax was reduced at the end of 2021, as part of the tariff shield, from €32/MWh for individuals to the legal minimum allowed by European rules (€1/MWh for individuals and €0.50/MWh for businesses), at a budgetary cost of nine billion euros a year. This increases to €21/MWh, raising the average bill for residential customers on the basic tariff by 8.6%, and for households on the peak/off-peak tariff by 9.8%.

=== Market consolidation caused by the 2021-2022 energy crisis ===
The energy crisis of 2021-2022 led to a major restructuring of the market: many of EDF's competitors, destabilized by the sharp rise in electricity and gas prices, withdrew from the market. In October 2021, Leclerc Energie stopped selling its contracts, leaving its 150,000 customers to find a back-up supplier. In November 2021, Hydroption, one of the suppliers to the army and Paris City Hall, had its license withdrawn for selling supply contracts at prices it was unable to meet. In January 2022, the UK's Bulb and Denmark's Barry withdrew from the French market, and Planète Oui, which claims some 160,000 customers, went into receivership. The Casino Group's energy subsidiary, GreenYellow, announces to its customers that it is ending the sale of gas supply contracts through its e-commerce site Cdiscount, and may do the same for electricity supply.

At the end of August 2022, Olivier Challan Belval, the French energy ombudsman, noted a sharp squeeze in energy offers: only 40 offers were listed by his services, compared with around a hundred in the summer of 2021, and the number of suppliers had risen from around thirty to 18.

Faced with a sharp rise in electricity prices, Iberdrola is writing to its customers to encourage them to return to the regulated tariff in order to “avoid seeing their bill ‘double or triple’”, and the CRE is examining the often dubious practices of “alternative electricity operators in terms of tariffs and in their relations with their customers”.

In the fourth quarter of 2022, “incumbent” suppliers (EDF, Engie and local distribution companies) gained 337,000 new residential customers, while alternative suppliers (TotalEnergies, Vattenfall, ENI) lost 319,000. In total, 71% of residential customers will benefit from a regulated electricity sales tariff or a market offer from an incumbent supplier by the end of 2022, compared with 69% by the end of 2021. Incumbent suppliers have also gained 66,000 new business customer sites, while alternative suppliers will see their portfolio fall by 49,000 sites by 2022.

=== Reform of the European electricity market ===
Following the global energy crisis of 2021-2023 and the sharp rise in electricity prices it caused, several member states have called for reform of the European electricity market to decouple electricity prices from gas prices. The European Commission has pledged to present a proposal by the end of the first quarter of 2023. On January 12, 2023, Bruno Le Maire promised that the French government would “put all its political weight behind it”, and demanded that the reform be adopted “within six months”.

France recognizes that the operation of the short-term wholesale market, based on marginal cost, should be retained, as “marginal pricing maintains a good match between energy demand and the capacities available to produce”. However, he advocates reducing the relative weight of this marginal tariff in the final price of electricity, by creating, alongside the traditional wholesale market, long-term power purchase contracts capable of stabilizing prices and providing visibility. Such contracts could include direct power purchase agreements (PPAs) between producers and customers, and contracts for difference (CfDs), similar to those used for renewable energies, which the French government is considering extending to nuclear power.

A report commissioned by the French Energy Regulatory Commission (CRE) from eleven university economists from various countries was presented on March 8, 2023. It concludes that the current system of daily auctions remains “the best for deciding who is the cheapest producer”, that “even if we agree that a long-term market must emerge, it is important to retain liquidity. Short-term markets should not be dried up; they also bring transparency”. The report, which was also submitted to the European Commission, is skeptical about a European capacity market, which would be difficult to set up with countries with such different energy mixes.

Announced in July 2022 by the Prime Minister, the State's takeover bid for EDF shares ended on June 8, 2023. EDF once again became a state-owned company, but electricity generation and supply remained in the competitive arena.

== Electricity generation ==
Although electricity generation is not subject to monopoly in France, it is subject to certain rules designed to reconcile freedom of production with security of supply and the objectives of French energy policy.

In France, two electricity producers generate over 95% of the country's electrical energy – (EDF and Engie).

Since Law 2000-108 of February 10, 2000, industrial companies have been free to apply for authorization to build and operate electricity generation facilities.

In 2003, the Commission de Régulation de l'Energie (French Energy Regulatory Commission) noted the presence of the following non-EDF producers:

- Compagnie Nationale du Rhône (CNR), which owns the hydroelectric plants in the Rhône valley, and continued its partnership with Belgian utility Electrabel. Electrabel had purchased the shares held by a number of local authorities in CNR;
- At the end of 2002, Electrabel also entered into a partnership with Société hydroélectrique du Midi (SHEM), a subsidiary of SNCF and another hydroelectric producer;
- Société nationale d'électricité et de thermique (SNET), heir to the Charbonnages de France power plants. SNET was bought by Spanish utility Endesa in 2004, then by E.ON in 2008, and finally by Czech Daniel Křetínský's EPH in 2019.

=== Generation and load shedding capacities ===
Article 6 of the NOME law obliges electricity suppliers to guarantee consumption and production curtailment capacities, in order to better balance electricity production and consumption. Load shedding consists in shifting electricity consumption from peak to off-peak periods. These shaving or production capacities can be traded on a capacity market.

=== Integrating renewable energies into networks ===
Article L. 314-1 of the French Energy Code stipulates that EDF and local distribution companies are obliged to purchase electricity generated by certain facilities at a regulated tariff for the 5% of their territory. The main aim is to promote the production of electricity from renewable sources, thereby helping to meet environmental and climate objectives. The additional costs incurred by distributors as a result of the difference between these regulated tariffs and the market price are reimbursed by a surcharge paid by electricity consumers: the Contribution au service public de l'électricité (CSPE), which will amount to €22.5/MWh in 2020.

Since 2016, feed-in contracts can be signed with other energy suppliers, the first approved being Enercoop, Direct Énergie and BCM Energy (parent company of Planète Oui).

The facilities that qualify for this feed-in tariff are:

- those that recover household waste or supply a heating network;
- onshore or offshore wind farms; facilities using marine, solar thermal, geothermal or hydrothermal energy;
- those using other renewable energies, or facilities using energy-efficient techniques such as cogeneration. These facilities are only eligible for the feed-in tariff if they comply with certain power limits defined by decree. In particular, these facilities must have an installed capacity of less than 12 MW. Biomass cogeneration only applies to facilities with a capacity of over 2 MW;
- windmills or watermills rehabilitated for electricity production;
- facilities that make use of recovered energy;
- in the French overseas departments, plants that generate electricity from biomass, including sugarcane.

Tariffs vary considerably depending on the type of energy source (tariffs are particularly high for solar electricity), the size of the plant and its environmental impact. The following table gives examples of feed-in tariffs and their legal basis.

| Electricity source | Brief description of the feed-in tariff | Legal basis |
|---|---|---|
| Photovoltaic panels | from 9.80 c€/kWh to 17.89 c€/kWh for an individual by the 1st quarter of 2022, depending on output and degree of building integration | |
| Biogas | from €64.87/MWh to €161.51/MWh depending on plant size and type of biomass | Biogas tariff order for 1st quarter 2022 |
| Biomass | 12.05 c€/kWh, to which an energy efficiency premium may also be added | Order of January 27, 2011 |
| Cogeneration | Higher rates during the winter period, from November 1 to March 31, depending on the price of gas | Order of July 31, 2001 |

As of January 1, 2016, the system of regulated feed-in tariffs for renewable energies will cease to apply to facilities with an installed capacity of over 500 kW, to be replaced by a system of market sales with a premium (complément de rémunération); this new system, imposed by the European Commission, does not apply to emerging sectors such as offshore wind power; onshore wind power has been given an extra two years; photovoltaic solar power, which depends on calls for tender for large-scale plants, will be affected from 2016, as will biomass, geothermal and biogas.

Obligation d'achat (OA) and complément de rémunération (CR)
| | 2012 | 2013 | 2014 | 2015 | 2016 | 2017 | 2018 | 2019 | 2020 |
|---|---|---|---|---|---|---|---|---|---|
| TWh produced under OA + CR | 40 | 43 | 45 | 50 | 54 | 58 | 66 | 72 | 79 |
| OA+CR subsidies (M€) | 3300 | 5057 | 5739 | 6394 | 6685 | 6855 | 7156 | 8099 | 8380 |

== Electricity supply ==
The electricity supply business covers all activities involved in marketing an electricity offer between its purchase from a producer and its sale to an end consumer.

=== Regulated and market offers ===
Customers are offered two types of contract: the regulated tariff contract (TRV), marketed exclusively by incumbent suppliers, and the market offer contract, offered by all suppliers.

According to the National Energy Ombudsman's October 2017 barometer, almost half of French residents are then unaware that it is possible to change electricity supplier. Only a third are aware that EDF and Engie are two different, competing companies.

==== Regulated sales tariffs ====
In France, consumers have access to tariffs defined by the government, on the recommendation of the Energy Regulation Commission. Only the incumbent supplier EDF and local electricity and gas distribution companies are obliged to offer these tariffs.

The regulated electricity tariffs (TRV) result from the addition of the price of regulated access to historical nuclear electricity (ARENH), marketing costs, a sales margin, and common components (TURPE, taxes, etc.).

There are several categories of regulated tariffs:

| Site type (contract power P) | Rates |
|---|---|
| Small sites: P <= 36 kVA | Blue rates |
| Medium-sized sites: 36 kVA < P <= 250 kVA | Yellow rates |
| Large sites: P > 250 kVA | Green tariffs A (customers connected to the distribution network) Green tariffs B and C (customers connected to the transmission network) |

Regulated tariffs for professional consumers (“green” and “yellow” tariffs) have disappeared since January 1, 2016. EDF has 220,000 business customers on 430,000 sites, including 100,000 on the green tariff and 330,000 on the yellow tariff. Since December 31, 2015, the 474,000 businesses, hospitals or local authorities subscribing to EDF's yellow or green tariffs (those with a subscribed power greater than 36 kVA) have had to sign a “market offer” contract with an electricity supplier under the sector's liberalization rules. At September 30, 2014, only 16% of the 41,000 large sites (59% of their 177 TWh consumption) and 5% of the 443,000 medium-sized sites (5% of their 59 TWh consumption) were already in market offers. A number of local authorities (Ville de Paris and Sipperec) and hospitals (UniHA) have launched calls for tender. According to the Commission de régulation de l'énergie (CRE), twelve electricity suppliers were active in the large business market in France in 2015, but, according to Engie CEO Gérard Mestrallet, “the level of yellow and green tariffs for businesses doesn't really allow us to be competitive today” (compared with EDF).

The NOME law provides for a gradual change, within the same timeframe, in the way regulated tariffs are calculated, using a methodology known as “cost stacking”. These regulated tariffs will be constructed to take account of the addition:

- ARENH (see above);
- the cost of the electricity supply top-up, which includes the capacity guarantee;
- electricity transmission costs;
- marketing costs;
- and normal remuneration.

In addition, the NOME law of 2010 stipulated that regulated tariffs, initially calculated on the basis of the costs of the incumbent operator EDF, would be calculated, by the end of 2015 at the latest, on the basis of the costs of alternative suppliers (Direct Energie, Engie, Planète Oui, etc.). ); this change was applied from November 1, 2014, resulting in an increase reduced to 2.5% for individuals instead of the 5% initially planned, and 1.5% in 2015 then 2% in 2016, according to CRE, whereas the previous calculation method would have resulted in a 6.7% increase for individuals this year. This reduction in increases limits the room for maneuver of alternative suppliers to compete with EDF with market offers. Furthermore, the decree modifying the method of calculating regulated electricity tariffs, published on October 29, 2014, specifies that application of the new calculation method will be “subject to EDF's costs being taken into account”. This mention introduced by the Conseil d'État is already the subject of divergent interpretations between the Ministry and suppliers.

On July 19, 2017, the Conseil d'État ruled that maintaining regulated natural gas tariffs was contrary to European Union law. Nicolas Hulot, the French Minister for Ecological and Solidarity Transition, acknowledged at a Senate hearing that "at one point or another, we will have to comply with Brussels' injunctions concerning gas and electricity tariffs. Obviously, we're going to make sure this happens as painlessly as possible".

Ten years after the opening of the gas and electricity markets to competition for residential customers, 84% of residential sites still subscribe to EDF's regulated electricity tariffs (TRV), and 49% of households using gas still have a contract with Engie's TRV. In 2017, the Association nationale des opérateurs détaillants en énergie (ANODE) filed a new appeal for the repeal of the TRVs, and published a white paper proposing a timetable.

At the end of 2017, EDF's competitors had 5.8 million residential customers, representing a market share of 17.9%, compared with 26.5 million for EDF. Over 2017, EDF lost one million residential customers subscribing to the regulated tariff. EDF also proposes market offers, which have only been chosen by 82,000 residential customers.

Following “trialogue” negotiations by representatives of the European Council, Commission and Parliament, agreement was reached on December 19, 2018, on the last two texts of the “Clean Energy Package”, which had been under discussion for two years: member states that still regulate household tariffs will be able to continue to do so, but will have to submit a report assessing the progress made towards ending price regulation. By 2025, the commission will have to present a report on overall progress in the EU, which may include a proposal to end tariff regulation.

At the end of 2018, the regulated blue tariff covered only 25.6 million households, or 77.3% of consumption sites and only 34% of total consumption; in one year, 900,000 customers left the regulated tariff; the market share of alternative suppliers grew by 4 points to 21.9%, and 35% of total consumption. EDF and ELDs have begun to offer market offers, which accounted for 272,000 customers at the end of 2018, compared with 82,000 customers at the end of 2017, and 31% of total consumption.

Electricity market offers gained 454,000 customers (or 5.2%) in 2019, and alternative suppliers reached 27.7% market share at the end of the year. This leaves nearly 24 million sites still on EDF's regulated tariff (or “blue tariff”).

In February 2023, regulated electricity tariffs rose by 15%. Then, on August 1, 2023, they are due to increase again, by 10%.

==== Renewable electricity offers ====
All suppliers entering the consumer market in 2017 (except Butagaz and Cdiscount) offer electricity from renewable sources (hydroelectric, wind or solar). In October, EDF launched two “green” market offers. With the exception of EDF, most of these suppliers do not produce all their own electricity; instead, they buy guarantee-of-origin certificates issued by producers. For each kWh consumed, the customer is assured that an equivalent quantity of renewable electricity is produced somewhere in Europe. The price varies widely depending on the origin of the “green” electricity: from a few dozen cents per megawatt-hour for large dams in northern Europe to a few euros/MWh for small French producers. Around 1.4 million residential customers are on green offers, i.e. 5% of volumes, while 17% of production in France is of renewable origin.

==== "At-cost" offers ====
A European directive resulting from the Clean Energy Package requires electricity suppliers with at least 200,000 customers to offer a “variable price” offer, directly indexed to the wholesale market price: when prices rise, the bill goes up, and when prices fall, the bill goes down. Initially scheduled for 2021, these offers could come into force as early as 2022. For the European Commission, such offers would encourage consumers to reduce their electricity consumption when it costs more, in order to meet future grid flexibility requirements. The first of these offers will be launched in March 2021 by Barry, a subsidiary of Finnish energy company Fortum. Consumer associations and electricity suppliers alike criticize the system, fearing an increase in disputes and unpaid bills, as well as the heavy IT investments it implies for suppliers.

On June 16, 2021, the Commission de régulation de l'énergie (CRE) published the terms of application of the reform for the main French electricity suppliers, who, from July 2023, will have to offer consumers bids indexed to electricity prices on the wholesale market: CRE has decided to impose a price ceiling on these offers, corresponding to twice the price a consumer would have paid each month if they had opted for a regulated tariff; moreover, it will be “particularly vigilant about consumer information obligations, before and during the life of the contract”. These obligations will be specified in a ministerial decree, after consultation with the CRE.

=== Offer comparators ===
Tariffs can be compared on websites known as “offer comparators”. There are private price comparators, but the public service obligation imposes the national comparator of the national energy ombudsman, Énergie-info. Only the latter, with its public status and those of consumer associations, can be described as totally impartial, reliable and independent. Its operation is governed by the French Energy and Climate Act.

The diversity of contractual offers has given rise to the energy broker business.

In early 2014, the consumer association UFC-Que choisir conducted a survey of sites comparing gas and electricity prices. It concluded that "apart from the official Énergie-info site, set up and managed by the national energy ombudsman, there are no real price comparison sites. Despite their promises, they do not seek to give consumers the best deal on the market. Their aim is to steer consumers towards partner suppliers who will pay them the most when they bring them a new customer. These sites are biased and abuse consumers' trust".

=== Market opening progress ===
Every quarter, the French Energy Regulatory Commission (CRE) publishes a report on the progress of market opening. Here are the main data for 3^{e} 2016:

- as at September 30, 2016, 4,224,000 residential sites were on market offers, or 13.2% of sites, along with 1,508,000 non-residential sites, or 30.2% (17.0% with alternative suppliers and 13.2% with incumbent suppliers);
- the electricity market is still dominated by FIT tariffs, which still account for 86.8% of residential sites and 69.8% of non-residential sites;
- consumption supplied under market offers reached 16.2 TWh (10.9%) in the residential segment and 251.2 TWh (87.4%) in the non-residential segment; alternative suppliers' market share reached 10.8% in the residential sector and 36.4% in the non-residential sector;
- the ARENH scheme saw no deliveries in the first half of 2016, as the market price was lower than the TRV of EDF's nuclear electricity to its competitors;
- 27 alternative suppliers are active and present on the Énergie-info website. There are also 160 local suppliers, in particular incumbent suppliers such as local distribution companies (ELD).

At the end of 2017, alternative suppliers' share of the residential customer market in France was 17.9%, representing 5.8 million customers and an increase of 3.7 points over the year. Their market share of all customers was 29% in the electricity market and 55% in the gas market at the end of 2016. Lastly, 38% of electricity sales were still handled by EDF at the regulated tariff, and 33% by EDF and ELDs under market offers. The abolition of regulated tariffs for businesses and local authorities has greatly accelerated the opening up of the market, but in the residential segment (individuals and small professionals) 88% of customers remain on the regulated tariff. Brussels has included in its latest “winter package” the medium-term abolition of this tariff in electricity, but the switchover is expected to be gradual.

In 2017, the number of electricity suppliers multiplied: after Total and Butagaz, e-tailer Cdiscount, part of the Casino group, launched an electricity offer that it claims is 15% cheaper than the TRV; but 84% of customers remain loyal to EDF. The proportion of French people who say they are aware of their right to change electricity supplier has stagnated at 50%, compared with 53% in 2013, and only 33% know that Engie and EDF are two separate, competing companies. Competitors' room for maneuver on costs is limited to 36% of the total cost, with 35% made up of taxes (including the Contribution au service public de l'électricité, which is mainly used to finance renewable energies) and 29% the cost of transport, which escapes competition. EDF lost one million customers between mid-2016 and mid-2017: it went from 27.5 to 26.5 million customers, according to the CRE; Engie already has 3.5 million electricity customers, and Total has set itself the goal of winning over 3 million.

In May 2018, the Conseil d'État, a court referred to by EDF's competitors, broadly validated the principle of electricity TRVs, but asked the government to regularly re-examine their relevance; the government proposes to carry out this re-examination every five years. The Conseil d'Etat also asked that the eligibility criteria for the non-residential blue tariff be reviewed, in order to introduce a distinction between small professionals (craftsmen, shopkeepers, liberal professions...) and non-residential sites belonging to large companies.

In October 2018, CRE commented on the excessive number of players present in France, anticipating a wave of consolidations. It is believed that too much competition is leading to sales at a loss, while EDF, which loses around 100,000 individual customers a month, still holds 80% of the residential market. According to the Chairman of the CRE, “we are in the prehistory of the effects of competition” on the electricity market.

In October 2018, EDF launched its first online electricity offer for residential customers, called Digiwatt.

In the first half of 2019, interventions for unpaid bills (power cuts or power reduction) reported by electricity suppliers to the national energy ombudsman rose by 18% compared with the first half of 2018. Several suppliers are arguing for the creation of an overdue payments file similar to the one compiled by telecoms operators; the Commission nationale de l'informatique et des libertés validated this project in May 2018. But the very principle of such a file for bad payers in the electricity sector has provoked a series of outcries.

For the vast majority of business customers, the TRV tariffs will end on December 1, 2020, for gas and January 1, 2021, for electricity. After this date, only 1.5 million micro-businesses and similar entities will still benefit from the electricity TRV.

At the end of 2020, EDF will still control 47% of the electricity consumed by industrial customers, and 54% for businesses and local authorities. In gas, by comparison, Engie now controls just 42% of volumes consumed by businesses, and only 31% for the largest accounts.

=== Suppliers ===
==== Regulated access to historical nuclear electricity (ARENH) ====
Under the NOME Act, EDF is obliged to sell up to 100 TWh per year of its nuclear-generated electricity, i.e. almost 20% of its annual production, to alternative electricity suppliers, under conditions “specified by decree of the Conseil d'État issued after consultation with the Commission de Régulation de l'Energie” (CRE).

The division of these electricity volumes between the various electricity suppliers is established by the CRE, on the basis of a mechanism that takes into account the size of their customer portfolios. The CRE requires EDF to sell part of its nuclear production to the competition at a price defined by ministerial decree, known as ARENH.

The price set by ministerial decree must be representative of the economic conditions of electricity production by nuclear power plants, taking into account the addition of four elements:

- return on capital, taking into account the nature of the business;
- operating costs;
- costs of maintenance investments or investments required to extend the duration of the operating license;
- the projected costs of long-term burdens on operators of basic nuclear installations.

The law also specifies that this price is initially set “in coherence” with the regulated and transitional market adjustment tariff (TARTAM), which, according to the “Champsaur 2” report, implies “that an alternative supplier can offer a consumer formerly on the TARTAM a comparable price, while meeting its costs”. The TARTAM would thus be equal to the sum of the costs of transmission, ARENH supply, complementary supply on the market and commercial costs.

While Gérard Mestrallet, chairman and CEO of Engie, considered it unacceptable to set a price higher than €35/MWh, Henri Proglio, chairman and CEO of EDF, called for a minimum of €42/MWh. The report issued at the government's request by a commission chaired by Paul Champsaur recommended a tariff of €39/MWh on average over the period 2011–2015.

The government finally set the ARENH price at €40/MWh on July 1, 2011, then at €42/MWh from January 1, 2012.

A new calculation method was to be set and should have been endorsed by the end of 2013, but negotiations with Brussels on the draft decree are dragging on. Brussels is said to be concerned about the consequences of the new ARENH calculation method on competition in electricity generation. In October 2014, the French Competition Authority had issued a critical opinion on the draft decree. EDF wants to obtain an ARENH of €52/MWh in the long term to cover its costs, but alternative suppliers have an interest in sourcing their supplies as a priority on the wholesale market, which has been offering more attractive prices (around €39/MWh) since the end of 2014.

Until 2013, the ARENH price represented a significant part of the electricity supply of alternative suppliers such as Direct Energie or Planète Oui.

On January 17, 2020, the government opened a consultation on a new mechanism to better remunerate nuclear production, enabling EDF to invest in the renovation of its existing nuclear fleet: EDF would market almost all of its nuclear production, i.e. around 360 TWh, with a stable, guaranteed price level, governed by a floor and a ceiling, between which the difference would be six euros.

On January 25, 2021, amid rumors of a breakdown in negotiations between France and the European Commission on a reform of the ARENH system, the EDF Group share lost up to 18% in the afternoon, closing with a 15% fall. The group would like to see at least an ARENH price of €48/MWh in exchange for the implementation of the so-called “Hercules” reorganization.

Quantities and amounts of ARENH purchases
| | 2012 | 2013 | 2014 | 2015 | 2016 | 2017 | 2018 | 2019 | 2020 |
|---|---|---|---|---|---|---|---|---|---|
| TWh purchased from ARENH | 61 | 64 | 71 | 16 | 0 | 82 | 96 | 120 | 126 |
| ARENH purchases (M€) | 2554 | 2701 | 2999 | 711 | 0 | 3616 | 4200 | 5184 | 5300 |

=== Consumer prices ===
Related article: Retail electricity prices in France.

Throughout France and most of the European Union, two types of offer coexist on the retail market:

regulated tariffs, set by the government, which only EDF and local electricity distribution companies (ELD) can offer;

market-priced offers, whose prices are freely determined, available from all alternative suppliers (Alterna, Enercoop, Engie, TotalEnergies, etc.) and incumbent suppliers (EDF, Gaz électricité de Grenoble, etc.). In practice, some free-price contracts are indexed to regulated tariffs.

At any time, consumers can choose to leave the regulated tariff or return to it unconditionally.

==== Common components ====
In both cases, the price includes the tariff for use of the public electricity network (TURPE), specific electricity taxes, and supplements to the electricity supply. These common components apply to all suppliers: EDF and alternative suppliers, including ELDs.

==== Tariff for use of the public electricity network ====
Detailed article: Tariff for use of the public electricity network.

TURPE is set by ministerial decision on the recommendation of CRE. TURPE is independent of the supplier, but depends on the power subscribed and the connection voltage.

==== Taxes ====
Several taxes are added to both the regulated tariff and the market price:

- taxes on final electricity consumption (TCFE);
  - communal taxes and departmental taxes;
  - domestic tax, created by the NOME law for the benefit of the State for customers with a maximum subscribed power of over 250 kVA. Companies whose electricity consumption represents a very high burden (electro-intensives) are exempt from payment of this tax;
- contribution au service public de l'électricité (CSPE), which finances tariff equalization, the basic tariff and the development of renewable energies via the feed-in tariff mechanism (see above);
- contribution tarifaire d'acheminement (CTA), set by ministerial decree as a percentage of the electricity transmission price;
- value-added tax (VAT).

==== Supply supplements ====
Changes in French regulations since 2016 have obliged suppliers to subscribe to various mechanisms:

- the capacity market designed to remunerate production resources that can be controlled at any time, to prevent any risk of supply cuts and guarantee the adjustment of electricity supply and demand;
- energy saving certificates (CEE), introduced to oblige electricity suppliers to finance energy renovation work;
- CO_{2} quotas.

These changes are passed on to consumers in their bills.

==== Off-peak rates ====
Reduced prices are charged for consumption during the hours of least tension on the national electricity grid, known as “off-peak hours”. These contractual arrangements are available under a regulated electricity tariff or in many market-based contracts, and will be used by 15 million French consumers in 2023. This system was originally designed to take advantage of the abundance of nuclear power at night, when demand is low. But the development of photovoltaic solar power has led to periods of surplus production in the early afternoon during the sunniest periods (spring and summer), as evidenced by the increasingly regular occurrence of negative market prices at the beginning of the 21st century, both in France and elsewhere in Europe. In May 2024, the French Energy Regulatory Commission (CRE) therefore asked Enedis to launch a project to overhaul the “peak, off-peak hours” system.

==== Causes of price rises ====
Despite the opening up of the electricity market to competition, electricity prices have risen sharply, by around 50% between 2007 and 2020, according to INSEE. The main reasons for this rise lie in changing regulations. Firstly, the growing weight of taxation, in particular the Contribution au service public de l'électricité (CSPE), a tax primarily intended to support the development of renewable energies; until 2016, it accounted for a large part of the increase in the electricity budget, but since 2016 it has ceased to rise.

From 2017, the capacity market took over. Capacity market prices, paid to electricity producers by electricity suppliers, who then pass them on to consumers' bills, have increased almost fourfold in four years (from around €1.8/MWh in 2017 to almost €6.5/MWh in January 2021).

In addition, the cost of energy saving certificates (CEE), well below €1/MWh until 2017, has risen to €5/MWh in 2021.

Finally, network costs are rising by 1.4% a year due to investments in connecting renewable energies and charging stations for electric vehicles, and the cost of supplying electricity suppliers on European markets is being driven up by the rising price of CO_{2} quotas.

=== Wholesale market ===
Related article: Wholesale electricity prices in France.

On the wholesale market, electricity is traded between producers, electricity suppliers and intermediary traders, before being delivered onto the grid to end customers (individuals or businesses).

Exchanges exist, such as EPEX SPOT for spot products (Paris) and EEX Power Derivatives France for forward products (Leipzig). Trading can also take place over-the-counter, either directly or through a broker. Transactions do not always result in physical delivery, as the product may be bought and then resold.

There are two types of product:

- spot products are delivered no later than the day after they are purchased (day ahead), or even faster (half-hourly products, hourly products or products traded in blocks of several hours). The day-ahead price, set daily on EPEX Spot, reflects the short-term balance between supply and demand. It is highly volatile, due to unforeseen variations that can affect both supply (untimely shutdown of a power plant, etc.) and demand (lower-than-expected temperatures, etc.); A market coupling mechanism, set up in November 2010 between France, Germany, Austria and the Benelux countries, coordinates pricing methods on national markets, thereby improving interconnection management and market liquidity. One consequence is the convergence of day-ahead prices in these countries;
- forward products are purchased with a view to future delivery. They enable suppliers to guarantee the volume and price of their supplies over a period of several weeks, months or years.

Products are further differentiated according to whether they concern baseload electricity (delivered throughout the day and year) or peak-load electricity (delivered at times of higher consumption, which may require the deployment of specific production capacities).

As forward contracts account for a large proportion of suppliers' supplies, sales tariffs to end consumers are based on forward prices rather than spot prices.

For example, 163 TWh were traded on the intermediated wholesale market in the 2nd quarter of 2011, mainly over-the-counter, with 126 TWh physically injected into the grid. Day-ahead prices quoted on EPEX averaged €49/MWh for baseload and €61.2/MWh for peak, with occasional peaks of almost €300/MWh. Futures prices averaged €59.5/MWh.

Under the effect of falling CO_{2} and coal prices, and then oil, wholesale electricity market prices fell below the ARENH price (€42/MWh) from December 2014, then to €38/MWh in January 2015, and the forward price for delivery in 2016 is now just €37/MWh: in Germany, the wholesale price has even fallen below €32/MWh; in November 2014, alternative suppliers' purchases from EDF fell by more than half, to 15.8 TWh, compared with 36.8 TWh a year earlier. What's more, as the regulated tariff has been partly indexed to the wholesale price since autumn 2014, this tariff has risen by much less than expected; these developments will stimulate competition and drive down EDF's market share; the primary beneficiaries of this are large industrial companies.

This price decline continued throughout 2015, and became more pronounced towards the end of the year. In January 2016, the wholesale electricity price on the short-term market was just €28/MWh. On the supply side, the fall in oil, gas and coal prices, which largely determine the cost of electricity production at European level, continued. On the demand side, European electricity consumption has not returned to its 2006 peak, and the start of winter 2015-2016 has been mild. The fall in wholesale prices has favored alternative electricity suppliers, increasing their competition with EDF. The order of magnitude of the impact of this drop for EDF, if the €28/MWh price were maintained, would be two billion euros per year.

In the fall of 2016, wholesale prices soared back up, reaching €275/MWh for base load supply on November 3, 2016, for delivery the following week, and even over €500/MWh for peak load supply; this was due to the exceptional shutdowns of nuclear reactors ordered by the ASN for checks on equipment forged by AREVA: Twenty units were still shut down, totalling 20 GW, or almost a third of nuclear capacity; these shutdowns had pushed prices back up to €70/MWh at the end of October, and the sharp drop in temperatures at the beginning of November amplified this rise. Wholesale prices for delivery in 2017 reached €49/MWh, thus exceeding the ARENH level (€42/MWh), which will push EDF's competitors to buy from EDF again at this tariff.

From spring 2018 onwards, wholesale prices rose gradually; this increase accelerated over the summer, passing the €50/MWh mark, and in September 2018 the price for delivery in 2019 reached €63/MWh; this development is strongly correlated with the rise in the price of CO2 emission allowances: for a long time remaining at around €5, the price per tonne of CO_{2} reached €23.7 in September 2018, under the effect of the stability mechanism designed to absorb allowances.

=== Direct sales ===
The power purchase agreement (PPA), which is widespread in the United States, is beginning to develop in France: in June 2020, Auchan signed three electricity supply contracts directly with their producer: purchase from Voltalia for 20 years of the output from two new solar power plants located in Grasse (Alpes-Maritimes) and Martigues (Bouches du Rhône), with a total capacity of 61 MW, and purchase from Canadian developer Boralex and French company Eurowatt of the electricity produced by two wind power plants that will no longer benefit from a state-guaranteed feed-in tariff from 2020 until 2023. These three transactions were concluded at a price of between €40 and €50 per megawatt-hour, and will cover 16% of the needs of Auchan, which is aiming to reach 100% by 2030. Similar contracts have already been signed by SNCF and Crédit Mutuel Alliance Fédérale.

In May 2024, Orange signed a 15-year contract with developer ZE Energy, which will supply 90 GWh a year from a 77 MW photovoltaic park planned for Vert, in the Landes region of France. It is coupled with 15 MW and 34 MWh batteries, designed to compensate for low solar panel output in the morning or at the end of the day, by storing excess production at mid-day.

=== A wealth of offers ===
Following in the footsteps of e-commerce pioneer Cdiscount, other digital companies, including the GAFAs, could be interested in the electricity market, shaking up the competitive electricity landscape with a profusion of offers.

As the market opens up to competition, the number of energy suppliers continues to grow: there were 31 in 2018, almost three times as many as in 2013. Cases of abusive canvassing by energy suppliers are multiplying: according to the Energy Mediator, 56% of French people were canvassed for a gas or electricity offer in 2018, compared with 36% in 2017. The mediator recorded 1,416 disputes (subscription disputes or denunciations of commercial practices) in 2018. Canvassing by telephone is in the majority (around 70% of contacts). Engie and ENI top the list of complaints, with three-quarters of disputes between them. In October 2019, the Direction générale de la concurrence et de la répression des fraudes fined Engie €900,000 for “breaches of the rules governing canvassing”. Another investigation is underway: the DGCCRF has searched the premises of Engie, Eni and eleven subcontractors specializing in door-to-door sales.

In June 2020, the Energy Ombudsman reported a 35% increase between 2018 and 2019 in commercial disputes (abusive or fraudulent canvassing, billing problems) between electricity and gas suppliers and their retail customers. In 2019, its services were referred to 1,883 disputes concerning canvassing, an increase of 65% in three years.

In 2019, Eni accounted for almost one in five disputes submitted to the ombudsman, or 329 disputes per 100,000 gas or electricity contracts, almost 60% more than in 2018; Engie was at 96 disputes per 100,000 contracts and Total Direct Energie at 93 disputes.

== See also ==
- Commission de régulation de l'énergie
- Electricity sector in France
- Electricity market
- Réseau de Transport d'Électricité
