= Emmanuelle Wargon =

French civil servant, politician and former lobbyist (born 1971)

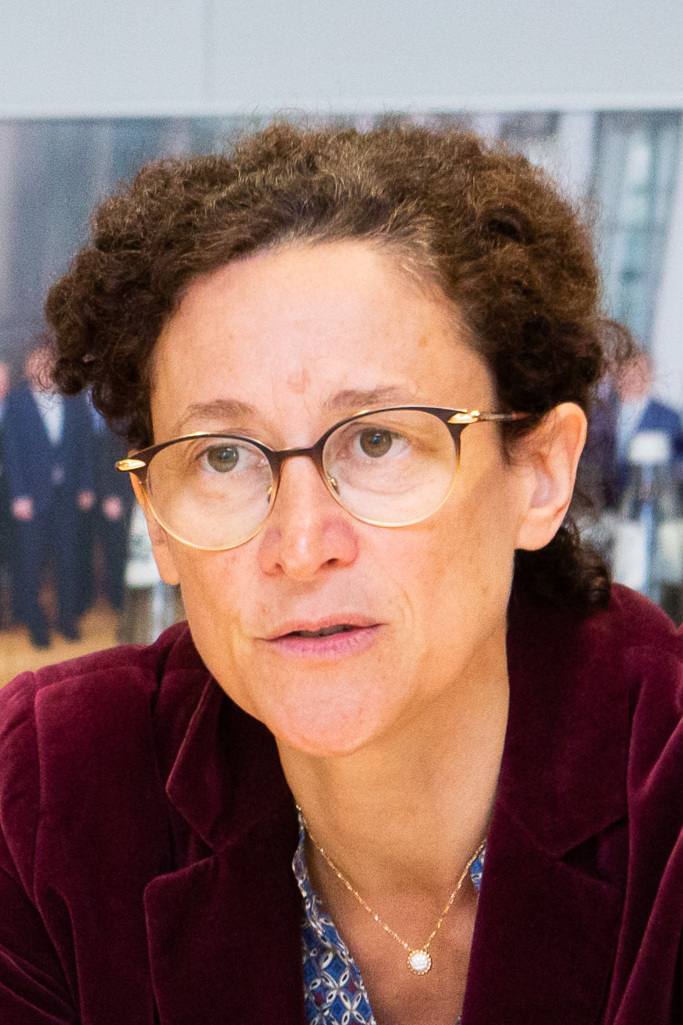
- Emmanuelle Wargon in 2023

President of the Commission de régulation de l'énergie
- Incumbent
- Assumed office 17 August 2022
- Preceded by: Jean-François Carenco

Minister Delegate for Housing
- In office 6 July 2020 – 20 May 2022
- President: Emmanuel Macron
- Prime Minister: Jean Castex
- Minister: Barbara Pompili
- Preceded by: Julien Denormandie
- Succeeded by: Olivier Klein

Secretary of State to the Minister of Ecological and Solidarity Transition
- In office 16 October 2018 – 6 July 2020
- President: Emmanuel Macron
- Prime Minister: Édouard Philippe
- Minister: François de Rugy; Élisabeth Borne
- Preceded by: Sébastien Lecornu

Personal details
- Born: Emmanuelle Stoléru; 24 February 1971 (age 55) Neuilly-sur-Seine, France
- Spouse: Mathias Wargon
- Children: 3
- Parent(s): Lionel Stoléru; Francine Wolff
- Education: HEC Paris; Sciences Po, ÉNA
- Awards: National Order of Merit

Emmanuelle Wargon (née Stoléru; born 24 February 1971) is a French civil servant, politician and former lobbyist who has been serving as president of the French Energy Regulatory Commission (CRE) since 2022.

During her political career, Wargon served as Minister Delegate for Housing in the Castex government of President Emmanuel Macron from July 2020 to May 2022 and as Minister of Ecological Transition attached to the Minister for Ecological and Inclusive Transition, from 2018 to 2020, in the government of Prime Minister Édouard Philippe.

== Early life and education ==
Wargon was born in Neuilly-sur-Seine on 24 February 1971, the only child of Lionel Stoléru (1937–2016), Secretary of State in the government of Michel Rocard under President François Mitterrand (1988–1991), and Francine Wolff (1944–2009) ENA graduate, Paris city administrator.

Emmanuelle Wargon went to secondary school at Lycée Molière in the 16th arrondissement of Paris, after completing her studies at HEC Paris in 1992, she entered Institut d'études politiques de Paris (popularly called Sciences Po), she then graduated from École nationale d'administration in the same promotion (Note: Promotion Marc Bloch (1995-1997)) as future Prime Minister Édouard Philippe in 1997.

== Career ==
=== Career in the public sector ===
Wargon began her career in 1997 as an auditor attached to the Court of Audit, the administrative court charged with conducting financial and legislative audits of public institutions. In 2001, she joined the cabinet of Bernard Kouchner, then Minister of Health, as technical advisor. A year later, she became Deputy Director of the French Agency for the Safety of Health Products (Afssaps), an agency whose main mission was to assess health risks posed by pharmaceutical drug.

In 2006, Wargon was appointed deputy director in charge of coordination and internal control at the Assistance Publique – Hôpitaux de Paris (AP-HP), before becoming in 2007 chief of staff to Martin Hirsch, the High Commissioner for Active Solidarity against Poverty in the government of François Fillon, during that period that she oversaw the implementation of the active solidarity income (RSA) in 2008 and the Grenelle de l'Insertion.

In 2010, Wargon was appointed secretary-general of the ministries responsible for social affairs (health, work, sport), then became general delegate for employment and vocational training (DGEFP) from 2012 to 2015, where she oversees the Youth Guarantee (mechanism for the integration of young dropouts), the reform of vocational training and the reform of social plans.

=== Career in the private sector ===
Wargon joined Danone in 2015 as Managing Director in charge of corporate social responsibility (CSR), public affairs and communications. She coordinates Danone's commitments in the areas of health, the environment, and inclusion and is involved in issues of climate strategy and agricultural transition. It thus supports the company in transforming its relationship with society and the environment. In 2016 she became SVP of Corporate Affairs & Sustainability Integrator.

=== Political career ===
On 16 October 2018, Wargon was appointed Secretary of State to the Minister of Ecological and Solidarity Transition François de Rugy in the second government of Prime minister Edouard Philippe.

From July 2020, Wargon was the Minister Delegate for Housing, attached to the Minister for the Ecological Transition in the Castex government. By May 2022, she was dismissed by the incoming Borne government.

=== French Energy Regulatory Commission (CRE) ===
In 2022, Wargon was appointed as president of the French Energy Regulatory Commission (CRE) for non-renewable six-year term.

== Personal life ==
Wargon is married to Mathias Wargon, an A&E doctor. They have three children.

== Awards ==
- 2015 – Chevalier de l'ordre national du Mérite

== See also ==
- Castex Government
