= Energy in Mayotte =

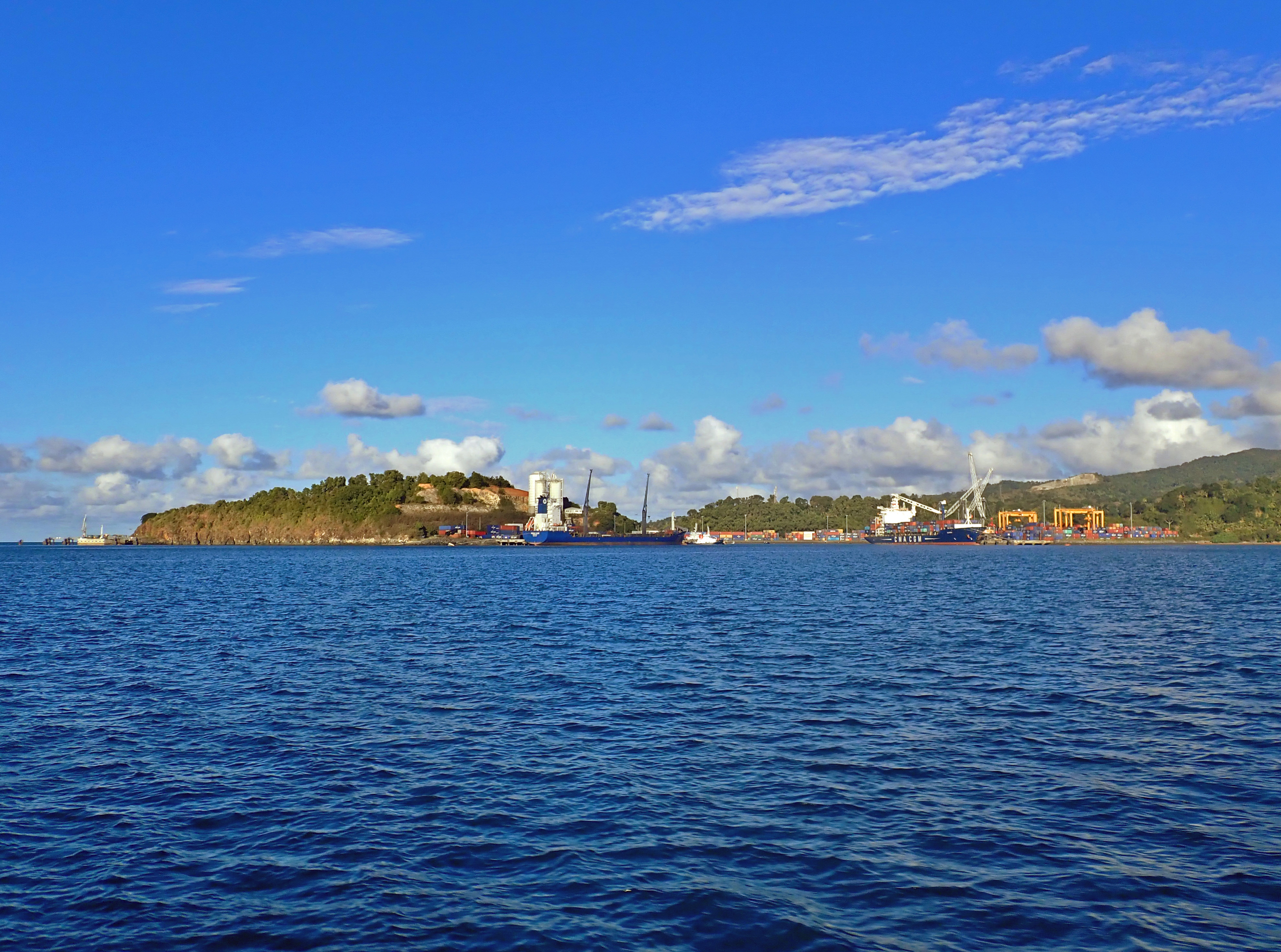
The port of Longoni generates most of the electricity in Mayotte.

The energy sector in Mayotte is mainly oriented towards the consumption of electricity based on fossil fuels; renewable energies are currently underdeveloped for the moment, and there is no export of fossil fuels.

Electricity in Mayotte in 2015 was 95% thermal sources and 5% renewable energy. The multi-year energy program sets a target of 30% renewable energies in final consumption in 2020. Electricity needs are growing strongly due to the growth of Mayotte and its population, as well as the increase in electricity. A number of air conditioners are also installed, which leads to peaks in consumption in summer; electricity consumption increased by 14.5% per year between 1995 and 2010. Petite-Terre, although smaller, consumes 15% of the total electricity, in particular because of the presence of the airport and the hospital, large consumers of electricity

Mayotte should welcome its first electric cars in summer 2019, as well as its first charging stations.

== Electricity ==
Mayotte has had access to electricity since 1977; the electricity network has only covered the entire territory since 1990. The only electricity supplier on the island is Électricité de Mayotte, a société anonyme d’économie mixte owned by the General Council of Mayotte (50.01%), Électricité de France (24,99%), SAUR International (24,99%), and the State (0,01%). EDM entered the Industries Électriques et Gazières (IEG) on 1st January 2011. It carries out the public service mission of producing, distributing and marketing electricity on the island of Mayotte. Its activities fall entirely within the field regulated by the Commission de régulation de l'énergie (CRE). The General Management as well as all the positions of managers of the operational divisions are carried out by employees of the EDF Group. Governance is provided by the State, ADEME, and EDM.

The inhabitants of Mayotte benefit from regulated tariffs in the same way as the metropolis, even if the production costs are five times higher than the energy share of these tariffs. The additional costs are covered by the contribution to the public electricity service (CSPE), paid by all consumers, and amount for example to 10.8 billion euros over the period 2002-2013

Mayotte Electricity Report
	2011		2012		2013		Variation (%)	
	GWh	%	GWh	%	GWh	%	2012/11	2013/12
Electricity production
Primary electricity	14	5,3	15	5,7	17	5,9	11,5	8,5
of which photovoltaic	14	5,3	15	5,7	17	5,9	11,5	8,5
Classic thermal	248	94,7	256	94,3	268	94,1	3,0	5,0
Total gross production	262	100	271	100	285	100	3,5	5,2
Energy branch consumption (% of production)
Internal consumption branch	14		14		15			
Losses and adjustments	8		11		10			
Total energy branch consumption	22	8,4	25	9,3	25	8,6	14	-2,6
Final electricity consumption
Residential	162	67,4	167	68,1	180	69,2	3,5	7,8
Professional (tertiary, industry, agriculture, transport)	78	32,6	78	31,9	80	30,8	0,4	2,1
Final consumption	240	100	246	100	260	100	2,5	6,0

== Thermal power stations ==
There are two thermal power stations in Mayotte, consisting of 17 diesel engines in all. The motors are of different powers (between 750kW and 8MW) and use different technologies. This makes it possible to adjust as needed.

The Badamiers power station, on the island of Petite-Terre, was commissioned in 1987, with a capacity of 38.1 MW; in 2013 this plant provided 38% of total production. This plant does not comply with industrial standards (particularly pollution or noise) but operates with a temporary exemption from the DEAL. Its potential upgrading would be costly; EDM plans to operate until 2023, when it would be at the end of its life

The Longoni power station, on the island of Grande-Terre, was commissioned in 2009, with a capacity of 40 MW, and provided 57% of total production. This plant is being extended to add 3 new Wartsila 12V46 engines of MW capacity each, which would add 36 MW of capacity.

The Kawéni power station, with a capacity of 11 MW, was opened in 1978, but it has been dismantled since.

== Oil ==
The island's oil imports are used for consumption for vehicles and thermal power stations.

== Renewable energies ==
The first solar panels were installed in 2009, and are not associated with storage. The installed capacity is 13 MW, in particular via the Longoni power plant, inaugurated in 2010. Solar energy is the only renewable energy with significant development potential on the island; the wind potential (22 MW according to a study) would not lead to a significant production because the wind blows only 6 months per year.

In 2019 (and since 2013), 5.9% of the total energy (electric and thermal) on the island comes from solar energy. This figure has not increased, despite the enormous potential of the island, due to a ceiling set by the Energy Regulatory Commission (CRE), due to the volatility of this type of energy. However, a solar energy storage program, called “Opera” (“Opération pilote énergies renouvelables”), which has been waiting for the green light since 2013, could allow targeting up to 30% of solar energy in the energy mix. A new program called "Gamissa" ( "Storage"in Shimaoré) was proposed by EdM in 2019, and could constitute the first milestone of a 50% solar energy target for the 2020s.
