= Sertin =

Sertin is a surname. Notable people with the surname include:

- Freddy Sertin (born 1980), French politician
- Peter Sertin (1927–1997), British Archdeacon
