= Jean-François Carenco =

French politician (born 1952)

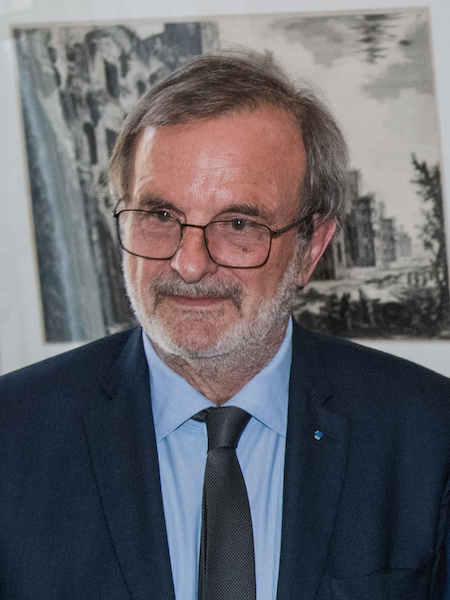
- Carenco in 2023

Minister Delegate for the Overseas
- In office 4 July 2022 – 20 July 2023
- Prime Minister: Élisabeth Borne
- Preceded by: Yaël Braun-Pivet (Note: As Minister of the Overseas until 25 June 2022. Prime Minister Élisabeth Borne in an acting capacity from 25 June to 4 July 2022.)
- Succeeded by: Philippe Vigier

President of the Commission de régulation de l'énergie
- In office 2017–2022
- Preceded by: Philippe de Ladoucette
- Succeeded by: Emmanuelle Wargon

Prefect of Paris
- In office 2015–2017
- Preceded by: Jean Daubigny
- Succeeded by: Michel Delpuech

Personal details
- Born: 7 July 1952 (age 74) Talence, France
- Party: Independent
- Education: HEC Paris; École nationale d'administration
- Occupation: Civil servant

Jean-François Carenco (French pronunciation: [ʒɑ̃ fʁɑ̃swa kaʁɑ̃ko]; born 7 July 1952) is a French civil servant and politician who served as Minister Delegate for the Overseas in the government of Prime Minister Élisabeth Borne from 2022 to 2023. Following his appointment by President François Hollande, he previously served as president of the French Energy Regulatory Commission (CRE) from 2017 to 2022.

Prior to joining the government, Carenco had a long career at the highest levels of the French Civil Service. He was a prefect in Saint-Pierre-et-Miquelon (1996–1997), Tarn-et-Garonne (1997–1999), Guadeloupe (1999–2002), Haute-Savoie (2002–2004), Seine-Maritime (2006–2007), Haute-Garonne (2007–2008), Rhône (2010–2015) and Paris (2015–2017).

== Notes ==
Political offices
Preceded by Élisabeth Borne; Acting	Minister Delegate for the Overseas; 2022–2023	Succeeded by Philippe Vigier
