= Jean-Yves Cousin =

French politician

Mayor of Vire
- In office 20 March 1989 – 30 March 2014
- Preceded by: Olivier Stirn
- Succeeded by: Marc Andreu-Sabater

Member of the National Assembly for Calvados's 6th constituency
- In office 19 June 2002 – 19 June 2012
- Preceded by: Alain Tourret
- Succeeded by: Alain Tourret

Personal details
- Born: 23 February 1949 (age 77) Périers, France
- Party: RPR; UMP
- Relatives: Alain Cousin (brother)
- Profession: Tax inspector

Jean-Yves Cousin (born 23 February 1949 in Périers, Manche) was a member of the National Assembly of France. He represented the Calvados's 6th constituency from 2002 to 2012 as a member of the Union for a Popular Movement. He also served as mayor of Vire between 1989 and 2014.
