= Lionel Stoléru =

French politician and civil servant

Secretary of State in charge of Plan
- In office 1988–1991
- President: François Mitterrand
- Prime Minister: Michel Rocard

Personal details
- Born: Lionel Guy Stoléru; 22 November 1937 Nantes, France
- Died: 30 November 2016 (aged 79) Paris, France
- Party: UDF
- Spouse: Francine Wolff
- Children: Emmanuelle Wargon
- Education: École polytechnique École des mines de Paris; Stanford University
- Awards: Legion of Honour

Lionel Guy Stoléru (22 November 1937 – 30 November 2016) was a French politician and civil servant. He was also an orchestra founder and conductor.

His father, Ilie, was a Romanian immigrant from Vaslui. Stoléru was born in Nantes and attended the École polytechnique, where he studied to be a mining engineer and graduated in 1956. Stoléru continued his studies at the École des Mines de Paris, and also did graduate studies at Stanford University in the US, earning a doctorate in economics with Kenneth Arrow.

From 1963 to 1965, Stoléru was a mining engineer in the Douai arrondissement. He was an academic at the Ecole polytechnique (Paris), and later at the Ecole des Mines de Paris, between 1969 and 1988. He also served in the cabinet of French President Valéry Giscard d'Estaing as an economic advisor, beginning in 1969. He subsequently held several administrative posts in several French governments:

- Secrétaire d'État chargé de la condition des travailleurs manuels (1974–1978)
- Secrétaire d'État chargé des travailleurs manuels et immigrés (1978–1981)
- Secrétaire d'État auprès du Premier ministre, chargé du Plan (1988–1991)

Stoléru learned the piano in his early years. In 1988, he formed the Orchestre Romantique Européen (ORE), and remained affiliated with the ORE until its disbandment in 2013. He was named a Commander of the Legion of Honour in December 2015.

Stoléru and his wife Francine Wolff, who died in 2009, had one daughter, Emmanuelle. He died in Paris in 2016 aged 79.

== Honours ==
On 31 December 2015, he was awarded the Legion of Honour in the grade of Commander.

== Selected publications ==
- L'Impératif industriel (1968)
- Vaincre la pauvreté dans les pays riches (1974)
- La France à deux vitesses (1982)
- L'Alternance tranquille (1985)
- L'Ambition internationale (1987)
- L'Économie (1999)
- Une écoute du romantisme (2011)
