= René Garrec =

French politician (1934–2023)

Member of the French Senate for Calvados
- In office 1 October 1998 – 30 September 2014
- Preceded by: Philippe de Bourgoing
- Succeeded by: Pascal Allizard

President of the Regional Council of Lower Normandy
- In office 21 March 1986 – 2 April 2004
- Preceded by: Michel d'Ornano
- Succeeded by: Philippe Duron

Member of the National Assembly for Calvados's 6th constituency
- In office 23 June 1988 – 21 April 1997
- Succeeded by: Alain Tourret

Personal details
- Born: 24 December 1934 Lanvéoc, France
- Died: 12 October 2023 (aged 88) Paris, France
- Party: RPR; UMP
- Education: University of Caen Normandy

René Garrec (24 December 1934 – 12 October 2023) was a French politician who was a member of the Senate, representing the Calvados department as a member of The Republicans. He died in Paris on 12 October 2023, at the age of 88.

== Biography ==
Born in Brittany, René Garrec pursued his career in Normandy after spending 30 months in Algeria as an officer in the army. With a law degree, a postgraduate degree in public law and political economy, and a diploma from the Caen Institute of Business Administration (IAE), he became an assistant lecturer and then a lecturer in economics at the University of Caen Normandy. In 1969, he was elected city councilor of Caen.

Subsequently, his career became inseparable from that of Michel d'Ornano, the influential mayor of Deauville. He followed him to the Ministry of Industry, then to the Ministry of Culture and the Environment as a special advisor. In 1986, Garrec took his place in the Lower Normandy region and remained president of the regional council for 18 years, before being defeated in 2004 by the socialist Philippe Duron, who took advantage of the wear and tear of power and the division of the regional right between René Garrec and the UDF's Philippe Augier.

Elected deputy for Calvados in 1988, re-elected in 1993 against Olivier Stirn with 55.25% of the vote, he was narrowly defeated in June 1997 by the radical Alain Tourret. He became senator for Calvados on September 27, 1998, and was re-elected on September 21, 2008, beating socialist Clotilde Valter by just 62 votes, thanks to the support of Green Party candidate Josiane Lowy in the second round. His deputy in the Senate is Pascal Allizard, mayor of Condé-sur-Noireau and vice-president of Anne d'Ornano in the Calvados General Council. On October 1, although he was not a candidate for the “plateau,” he received 19 votes in the election for Senate president, which was ultimately won by former minister Gérard Larcher. He also chaired the Senate Law Commission, then served as first quaestor of the Senate and then second quaestor.

Close to Jacques Chirac and Jean-Pierre Raffarin, he simultaneously joined the Council of State as a maître des requêtes (senior clerk), then became a conseiller d'État (senior advisor) in 1997. He retired in 2000.

He is not running for re-election to the Senate in September 2014, but is supporting Pascal Allizard list.

He died on October 12, 2023, at the age of 88.

== Sources ==
- Page on the Senate website
