= Alain Tourret =

French politician

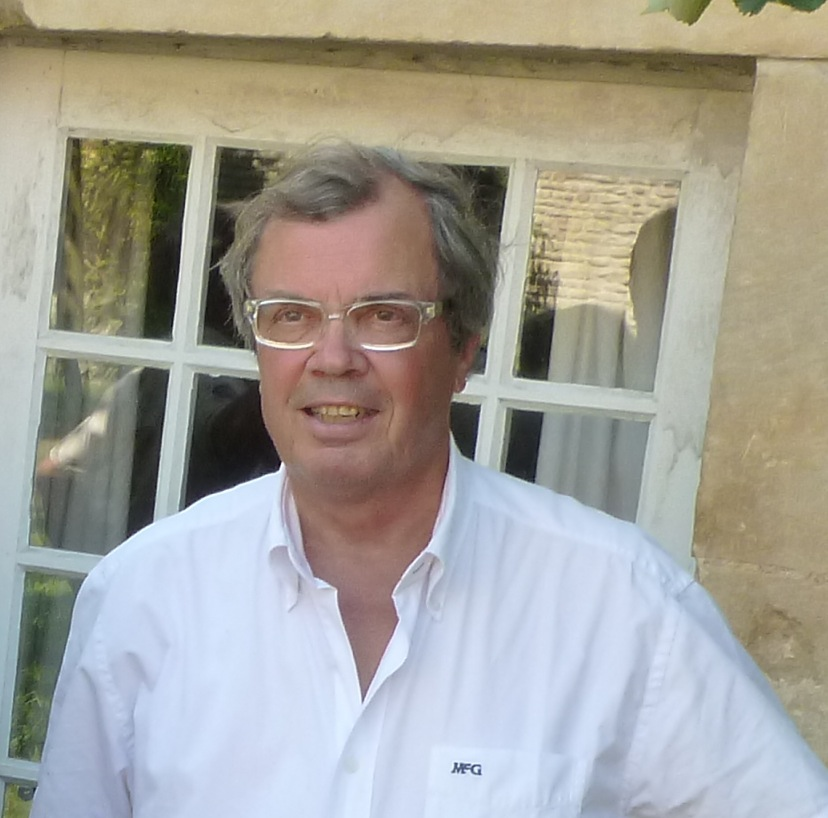
- Alain Tourret in 2013

Member of the National Assembly for Calvados's 6th consistuency
- In office 20 June 2012 – 21 June 2022
- Preceded by: Jean-Yves Cousin
- Succeeded by: Élisabeth Borne
- In office 12 June 1997 – 18 June 2002
- Preceded by: René Garrec
- Succeeded by: Jean-Yves Cousin

Mayor of Moult
- In office 15 March 1981 – 31 December 2016
- Succeeded by: Sylvain Rault

Personal details
- Born: 25 December 1947 (age 78) Boppard, Germany
- Party: Renaissance (2017–present)
- Other political affiliations: Radical Party of the Left (before 2017)
- Spouse(s): Marie-Hélène O'Neill; Caroline de Corbiac
- Children: 4
- Education: University of Caen
- Profession: Lawyer

Alain Tourret (born 25 December 1947) is a French politician. He served as the deputy for Calvados's 6th constituency. He was deputy from 1997 to 2002, then again from 2012 to 2022. He was previously a member of Radical Party of the Left then La République En Marche! from 2017.

== Honours ==
- Order of the Rising Sun, 2nd Class, Gold and Silver Star (2022)

== See also ==
- French legislative elections 2017
