= Calvados's 6th constituency =

Constituency of the National Assembly of France

6th constituency of Calvados
- inline Constituency of the National Assembly of France

- Constituency in Department

- Calvados in France
- Deputy: Élisabeth Borne; RE
- Department: Calvados
- Cantons: Aunay-sur-Odon, Le Bény-Bocage, Bourguébus, Condé-sur-Noireau, Evrecy, Saint-Sever-Calvados, Thury-Harcourt, Vassy, Villers-Bocage, Vire

The 6th constituency of Calvados is a French legislative constituency in the Calvados département. Like the other 576 French constituencies, it elects one MP using the two-round system, with a run-off if no candidate receives over 50% of the vote in the first round.

== Historic representation ==
Election	Member	Party
1988	René Garrec	UDF
1997	Alain Tourret	PRG
2002	Jean-Yves Cousin	UMP
2007	Jean-Yves Cousin	UMP
2012	Alain Tourret	PRG
2017	Alain Tourret	LREM
2022	Élisabeth Borne	RE
2022	Freddy Sertin	RE
2024	Élisabeth Borne	RE
2025	Freddy Sertin	RE

== Election results ==
=== 2024 ===
Candidate	Party	Alliance	First round		Second round	
Candidate	Party	Alliance	Votes	%	Votes	%
Élisabeth Borne	REN	Ensemble	19,213	28.93	35,962	56.36
Nicolas Calbrix	RN		24,077	36.26	27,851	43.64
Noé Gauchard	LFI	NFP	15,376	23.16		
Lynda Lahalle	DVD		5,080	7.65		
Philippe Ambourg	DLF		1,128	1.70		
Esteline Caillemer	REC		650	0.98		
Bérengère Lareynie	DVG		262	0.39		
Pascale Georget	LO		650	0.98		
Valid votes			66,402	96.66	63,813	93.09
Blank votes			1,589	2.31	3,388	4.94
Null votes			708	1.03	1,350	1.97
Turnout			68,699	71.31	68,551	71.14
Abstentions			27,634	28.69	27,806	28.86
Registered voters			96,333		96,357	
Result			REN HOLD			

=== 2022 ===
Legislative Election 2022: Calvados's 6th constituency
Party	Candidate	Votes	%	±%
LREM (Ensemble)	Élisabeth Borne	16,491	34.32	-2.69
LFI (NUPÉS)	Noé Gauchard	11,786	24.53	+7.81
RN	Jean-Philippe Roy	10,447	21.74	+8.19
LC (UDC)	Lynda Lahalle	3,473	7.23	−4.94
REC	Valérie Dupont	1,342	2.79	N/A
DLF (UPF)	Mickaël Guettier	1,195	2.49	N/A
Others	N/A	3,317	6.90	
Turnout		48,051	51.16	−0.17
2nd round result
LREM (Ensemble)	Élisabeth Borne	23,437	52.47	-15.87
LFI (NUPÉS)	Noé Gauchard	21,233	47.53	N/A
Turnout		44,670	50.34	+6.82
LREM hold				

=== 2017 ===
Candidate	Label	First round		Second round	
Candidate	Label	Votes	%	Votes	%
Alain Tourret	REM	17,108	37.01	24,289	68.34
Jean-Philippe Roy	FN	6,262	13.55	11,252	31.66
Hubert Picard	UDI	5,627	12.17		
Paul Demeilliers	FI	4,767	10.31		
Pascal Martin	DVD	4,035	8.73		
Sibylle Corblet Aznar	ECO	2,341	5.06		
Évelyne Stirn	DVD	1,804	3.90		
Chantal Beaudoin	PRG	1,676	3.63		
Thomas Gallice	DLF	746	1.61		
Virginie Poirier	PCF	622	1.35		
Pascale Georget	EXG	385	0.83		
Serge Lèzement	DVG	324	0.70		
Bruno Hirout	EXD	230	0.50		
Audrey Mabboux-Stromberg	DIV	203	0.44		
Yvan Yonnet	DVG	93	0.20		
Votes		46,223	100.00	35,541	100.00
Valid votes		46,223	96.46	35,541	87.29
Blank votes		1,130	2.36	3,579	8.79
Null votes		566	1.18	1,596	3.92
Turnout		47,919	51.33	40,716	43.52
Abstentions		45,430	48.67	52,835	56.48
Registered voters		93,349		93,551	
Source: Ministry of the Interior

=== 2012 ===
Summary of the 10 June and 17 June 2012 French legislative election in Calvados’ 6th Constituency
Candidate	Party		1st round		2nd round	
Candidate	Party		Votes	%	Votes	%
Alain Tourret	Radical Party of the Left	PRG	22,826	41.47%	29,570	53.27%
Jean-Yves Cousin	Union for a Popular Movement	UMP	20,669	37.55%	25,940	46.73%
Marie-Françoise Leboeuf	Front National	FN	5,860	10.65%		
Viviane Boufrou	Left Front	FG	2,066	3.75%		
Laurent Decker	Europe Ecology – The Greens	EELV	1,875	3.41%		
Hubert Heuze	Radical Party	PRV	496	0.90%		
Serge Lezement	Miscellaneous Left	DVG	369	0.69%		
Gérard Leroy	Far Left	EXG	336	0.61%		
Pascale Georget	Far Left	EXG	273	0.50%		
Christiane Herouard	Miscellaneous Right	DVD	269	0.49%		
Total			55,039	100%	55,510	100%
Registered voters			90,979		90,970	
Blank/Void ballots			1,042	1.86%	1,479	2.60%
Turnout			56,081	61.64%	56,989	62.65%
Abstentions			34,898	38.36%	33,981	37.35%
Result					PRG gain from UMP	

=== 2007 ===
Summary of the 10 June and 17 June 2007 French legislative election in Calvados’ 6th Constituency
Candidate	Party		1st round		2nd round	
Candidate	Party		Votes	%	Votes	%
Jean-Yves Cousin	Union for a Popular Movement	UMP	26,012	46.88%	30,064	54.83%
Alain Tourret	Radical Party of the Left	PRG	16,248	29.28%	24,771	45.17%
Franck Lelievre	Democratic Movement	MoDem	3,635	6.55%		
Jean-Baptiste Lemazurier	Front National	FN	1,809	3.26%		
Pascal Giloire	The Greens	VEC	1,640	2.96%		
Didier Vergy	Hunting, Fishing, Nature, Traditions	CPNT	1,391	2.51%		
Gérard Leroy	Far Left	EXG	1,222	2.20%		
Claudine Carin	Communist	PCF	682	1.23%		
Sylvie Bernard	Ecologist	ECO	611	1.10%		
Anne Flambard	Far Left	EXG	545	0.98%		
Isabelle Peltre	Far Left	EXG	500	0.90%		
Véronique Roulle	Movement for France	MPF	486	0.88%		
Stéphanie Fouque	Independent	DIV	288	0.52%		
Françoise Levaigneur	Far Right	EXD	218	0.39%		
Fanny Anne	Independent	DIV	149	0.27%		
Michel Menneson	Miscellaneous Right	DVD	52	0.09%		
Total			55,488	100%	54,835	100%
Registered voters			88,719		88,719	
Blank/Void ballots			1,087	1.92%	1,514	2.69%
Turnout			56,575	63.77%	56,349	63.51%
Abstentions			32,144	36.23%	32,370	36.49%
Result					UMP HOLD	

=== 2002 ===
Legislative Election 2002: Calvados's 6th constituency
Party	Candidate	Votes	%	±%
UMP	Jean-Yves Cousin	23,155	42.81	
PRG	Alain Tourret	18,291	33.82	
FN	Daniel Bassiere	4,721	8.73	
CPNT	Didier Vergy	2,169	4.01	
LV	Olivier Joliton	1,543	2.85	
Others	N/A	4,211		
Turnout		55,369	66.23	
2nd round result
UMP	Jean-Yves Cousin	28,640	54.58	
PRG	Alain Tourret	23,832	45.42	
Turnout		54,221	64.86	
UMP gain from PRG				

=== 1997 ===
Legislative Election 1997: Calvados's 6th constituency
Party	Candidate	Votes	%	±%
UDF	René Garrec	19,109	37.05	
PRG	Alain Tourret	14,869	28.83	
FN	Emmanuel Regnouf	5,896	11.43	
PCF	François Bonnet	3,210	6.22	
LV	Jacques Leblanc	2,308	4.47	
MPF	Bernard Lejeune	1,940	3.76	
GE	Jean-Paul Rodary	1,586	3.07	
DIV	Gérard Le Lay	1,063	2.06	
Others	N/A	1,598		
Turnout		55,147	70.34	
2nd round result
PRG	Alain Tourret	27,880	50.55	
UDF	René Garrec	27,274	49.45	
Turnout		58,537	74.66	
PRG gain from UDF				

== Sources ==
- Official results of French elections from 1998: "Résultats électoraux officiels en France" (in French).
