= Order of precedence in France =

Relative preeminence of officials for ceremonial purposes

The order of precedence (French: ordre de préséance) for public ceremonies in France is established by Décret n°89-655 du 13 septembre 1989 relatif aux cérémonies publiques, préséances, honneurs civils et militaires (Decree no. 89–655 of 13 September 1989 relating to public ceremonies, precedence, and civil and military honours). The original order has been modified since 1989, for example inserting the Defender of Rights after that office's 2011 creation. As of 17 October 2025 the order is as follows:

1. The President of the Republic (Emmanuel Macron)
2. The Prime Minister (Sébastien Lecornu)
3. The President of the Senate (Gérard Larcher)
4. The President of the National Assembly (Yaël Braun-Pivet)
5. Former Presidents of the Republic, in order of term
  1. Nicolas Sarkozy
  2. François Hollande
6. The Government, in the order decided by the President of the Republic (Lecornu government)
7. Former Prime Ministers, in order of term
  1. Laurent Fabius
  2. Édith Cresson
  3. Alain Juppé
  4. Jean-Pierre Raffarin
  5. Dominique de Villepin
  6. François Fillon
  7. Jean-Marc Ayrault
  8. Manuel Valls
  9. Bernard Cazeneuve
  10. Édouard Philippe
  11. Jean Castex
  12. Élisabeth Borne
  13. Gabriel Attal
  14. Michel Barnier
  15. François Bayrou
8. The President of the Constitutional Council (Richard Ferrand)
9. The Vice President of the Conseil d'État (Marc Guillaume)
10. The President of the Economic, Social and Environmental Council (Claire Thoury)
11. The Defender of Rights (François-Noël Buffet)
12. Members of the National Assembly
13. Senators
14. European parliament members
15. The judicial authority represented by the first President of the Court of Cassation (Christophe Soulard) and the public prosecutor of that court (Rémy Heitz)
16. The first President of the Revenue Court (Cour des Comptes) (Amélie de Montchalin) and the public prosecutor of that court (Véronique Hamayon)
17. The Great Chancellor of the Légion d'honneur, chancellor of the National Order of Merit (Général François Lecointre) and the members of the councils of these orders
18. The Chancellor of the Order of the Libération, and the members of the council of this order
19. The Chief of the Defence Staff (Général Fabien Mandon)

The following then apply in Paris:

1. The prefect of the Île-de-France région, prefect of Paris (Georges-François Leclerc)
2. The prefect of police, prefect of the Paris defense zone (Patrice Faure)
3. The Mayor of Paris, president of the Council of Paris (Emmanuel Grégoire)
4. The representatives to the European Parliament
5. The chancellor of the Institute of France (Xavier Darcos), the perpetual secretaries of the French Academy, the Académie des inscriptions et belles-lettres, the Academy of Sciences, of the Académie des beaux-arts and of the academy of moral and political sciences
6. The general secretary of the government; the general secretary of national defence; the general secretary of the Ministry of foreign affairs
7. The president of the administrative court of appeal of Paris (Pascale Fombeur); the first president of the Paris court of appeal (Jacques Boulard) and the general public prosecutor of that court (Marie-Suzanne Le Quéau)
8. The general delegate for weaponry; the general secretary for administration of the Ministry of defence; the chief of staff of the army; the chief of staff of the navy; the chief of staff of the air force; the military governor of Paris, commanding the Île-de-France army region
9. The president of the Regulatory Authority for Audiovisual and Digital Communication (ARCOM) (Martin Ajdari)
10. The president of the National Commission on Informatics and Liberty (CNIL) (Marie-Laure Denis)
11. The president of the Autorité de la concurrence (Benoît Cœuré)
12. Universities of Paris

There are analogous orderings for local officials at events in Metropolitan France outside Paris, for Overseas France, and on naval bases. There are also provisions to allow subordinate to take the place of certain head officers, if absent. For events organised by a public body other than the national government, the body's head ranks second after the representative of the State (President, prefect, or sub-prefect).
