= Raymond Soubie =

- Born: 23 October 1940 (age 85); Talence, France
- Education: Institut d'études politiques de Bordeaux; École nationale d'administration
- Occupation: Advisor in Social affairs to Nicolas Sarkozy

Raymond Soubie (born 23 October 1940) is a former social affairs advisor to former French President Nicolas Sarkozy.

== Biography ==
Raymond Soubie is a graduate of the Institut d'études politiques de Bordeaux (class of 1960) and the École nationale d'administration (class of 1964). In 1969, he worked as an advisor to Minister of Labour Joseph Fontanet. He then worked for Jacques Chirac and Raymond Barre. He also served as an advisor to Prime Minister Pierre Bérégovoy, Édouard Balladur and Alain Juppé.

In 1981, he became the Director of Liaisons Sociales, the second biggest press firm in France. In 1992, he created a consulting firm, Altedia. In 2004, 80% of the CAC 40 enlisted its services.
