= Total Direct Énergie =

French international electric utility company

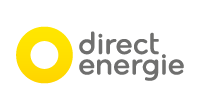
- Type: Société Anonyme; Subsidiary of Total S.A.
- Industry: Electric utility
- Founded: March 2003; 23 years ago
- Headquarters: Paris, France
- Key people: Xavier Caïtucoli (CEO)
- Products: Natural gas distribution, electricity generation and distribution, wind power
- Revenue: ▲€1.966 billion (2017)
- Net income: €51.9 million (2017)
- Total equity: €2.020 billion (2016)
- Owner: TotalEnergies (100%)
- Number of employees: 416 (2016)
- Website: total.direct-energie.com

Total Direct Énergie, formerly Direct Énergie, is a French international electric utility company, which operates in the fields of electricity generation and distribution, natural gas, and renewable energy. Founded in France in 2003 as an alternative to the historic monopoly Électricité de France, it is present in Belgium through the subsidiary Poweo.

== Activities ==
The group produces electricity and serves 2.1 millions consumers in France and Belgium, both in retail and company-oriented market. It handles 800 MW of electricity production capacity, mainly gas power stations.

== History ==
Founded in 2003, Direct Énergie made no profit in serving the corporate market nor the household market during its first years of existence. In 2008 is founded Neoen, a subsidiary dedicated to build and operate renewable power stations.

The group bought 46% of its competitor Poweo in 2011, before merging the following year.

In April 2018, the French energy major Total S.A. announced their bid to purchase 74% of Direct Énergie capital from their main stockholders, for 1.4 billion euros. On 6 July 2018 Total S.A. acquired 73.04% stake in the share capital of Direct Énergie. In September of that year, Total S.A. announced the acquisition of 95% of the shares and voting rights in the company, and that they would be beginning squeeze-out procedures to acquire the remaining shares. Following its acquisition by Total S.A., it withdrew from the Paris Stock Exchange Euronext Paris, with the suspension of trading on 19 September 2018 and its delisting on 27 September.

In December 2022, the NGOs Friends of the Earth, Survie and four Ugandan NGOs sent the oil group Total to court and accused it of violating the law on the duty of vigilance of large French companies in terms of human rights and environment..

== Sponsoring ==
Direct Énergie was a partner of the Olympique de Marseille from 2008 to 2010. The company has been the main sponsor of a French pro cycling team since 2016.
