= Catherine Guillouard =

French businesswoman (born 1965)

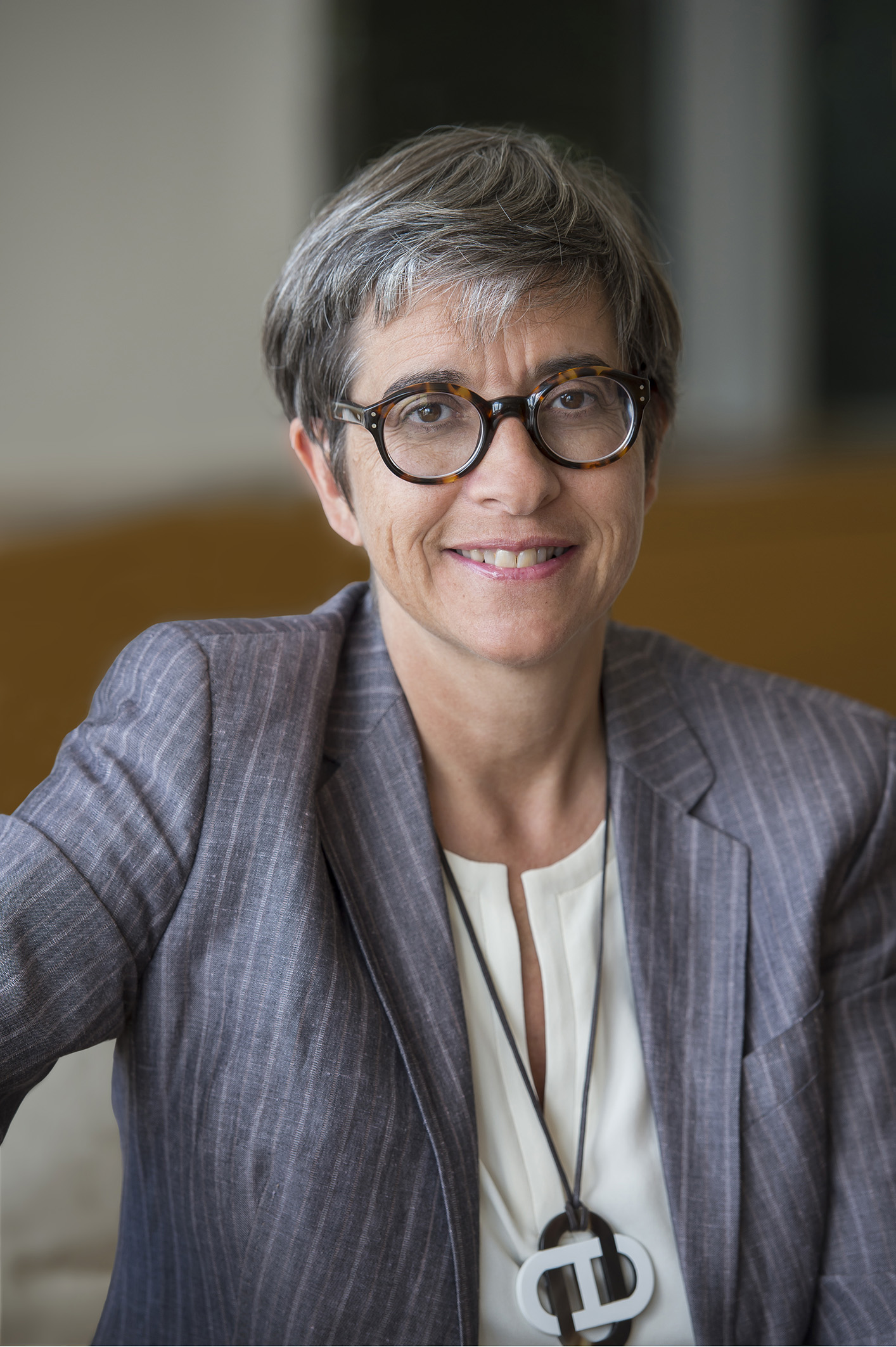
- Born: 23 January 1965 (age 60); Cannes, France
- Education: University of Nice; Sciences Po, ÉNA
- Occupation: CEO of RATP Group (2017–2022)
- Predecessor: Élisabeth Borne
- Successor: Jean Castex

Catherine Guillouard (born 23 January 1965 in Cannes) is a French businesswoman. She was the chairwoman and chief executive officer of RATP from August 2017 to 30 September 2022.

== Early life and education ==
After having finishing her secondary studies in Cannes and a ski diploma (she holds a national diploma as a ski instructor)., Catherine Guillouard obtained a law degree from Sophia Antipolis University in Nice. She then went on to receive a master's degree in political science from Panthéon-Assas University in 1986. She also holds a diploma from the Paris Institute of Political Studies (Public Service section), is a 1993 graduate of the École nationale d'administration (Léon-Gambetta class) and has a master's degree in European law from Panthéon-Sorbonne University.

== Career ==
Upon completion of her studies at the École nationale d'administration in 1993, Catherine Guillouard began her career at the Ministry for the Economy in the French Treasury, initially working for the department in charge of the Africa-CFA zone and later in the Banking Affairs Department. She joined Air France four years later where she remained for 10 years (1997–2007), working in a diverse range of positions, from finance to human resources, operations and the management of transformation projects.

=== Air France (1997–2007) ===
From 1997 to 1999, Catherine Guillouard worked at Air France as a Senior Project Manager. She organised and coordinated the plan to open the company's capital allowing its employees to hold 11% of its shares.

As Deputy Vice-President of Finance Management (1999–2001), she established a new management loop process with a five-year strategic vision and a three-year mid-term plan. She worked together with a team on the revision of management tools, notably on the creation of a tool for the analysis of the air network (ARA) which measures its profitability.

In 2001, she was named Senior-Vice President of Flight Operations. Alongside the Deputy CEO, she managed the Flight Operations division, made up of 4,000 pilots in the Group and a ground staff of 1,200. During the same time, she chaired the committee for the establishment of Flight Operations where all of the company's technical and commercial flight personnel trade unions are located.

In 2003, she was promoted to the position Senior Vice-President of Human Resources and Change Management where she managed four branches: training, recruitment, human resources policy for ground staff and human resources development. She also drove the "Increase change" project for the company's executive board, which together with the "Customers" and "Alliances" projects made up the three pillars of Air France's strategic plan designed by Jean-Cyril Spinetta.

Her involvement in the company's strategy led her to become the head of Air France's Financial Affairs Division. From 2004 to 2007, she renegotiated new bank lines of credit for €1.2 billion, succeeded in the first convertible bonds transaction totalling €450 million for the Air France KLM Group as well as a conventional bond for €550 million. She also improved the shareholdings monitoring policy and optimised the cash-flow process.

=== Eutelsat (2007–2013) ===
In 2007, she joined Eutelsat as Chief Financial Officer and member of the Executive Committee. She led a number of noteworthy initiatives, among which the refinancing of the company in a phased approach amounting to €3.4 billion, acquisitions particularly in Asia and a revision of the company's internal reporting. She was also responsible for the implementation of an innovative satellite insurance policy.

=== Rexel (2013–2017) ===
Guillouard worked as chief financial director at Rexel from 2013 to 2017, and deputy chief executive officer as of May 2014. As deputy executive director, her mission was to assist the CEO in the implementation of the strategy confirmed by the group's board of directors and to manage the group's financial performance. Her role also covered the group's auditing, internal control, risk management, compliance, legal matters, indirect procurement and mergers and acquisitions.

She actively contributed to defining and implementing the strategic plan, notably regarding the setting up of a digital transformation plan. She also drove a very steady external growth policy composed of 14 operations over three years (2013–2016), in South-East Asia, the Middle East, the United States and France. At the same time as these targeted acquisitions, she managed the company's departure from Latin America, Poland, the Baltic States and Slovakia.

She also led several large-scale transformation projects, such as the review of the governance of risk management and compliance, the implementation of a very efficient procedure for the closing of accounts and the revision of the legal department.

=== RATP Group (2017–2022) ===
On 2 August 2017, Guillouard succeeded Élisabeth Borne as Chairwoman of the Régie autonome des transports parisiens (RATP).

The Group, which today is worth €5.45 billion, is one of the world's leading urban public transport operators, carrying more than 16 million passengers per day in 14 countries on four continents. With more than 20% of its revenue generated internationally, RATP is a multimodal operator – with more than eight modes of transport – and the world leader in the tramway and automatic metro. The expertise of its 60,000 employees in engineering, maintenance and operations, its many projects (more than 3,000 carried out in 2017–2018, a level unmatched since the 1930s) and its very high investment level in Île-de-France (€8.5 billion between 2016 and 2020, of which €4.2 billion in equity and €1.74 billion in investment planned in 2018) make RATP a major economic and social player.

On 8 December 2017, Catherine Guillouard presented her strategic orientations to the Board of Directors.

This operational plan, builds on Élisabeth Borne's "2025 Challenges" business plan, based on extensive in-house consultation, and sets a two-fold ambition for RATP Group: to be a leader in sustainable and connected mobility and to establish itself as the privileged partner of smart cities.

This ambition is based on four priorities: achieving operational excellence, succeeding in the opening up to competition, being the best partner for smart and sustainable cities and increasing RATP Group's international development.

These four priorities, implemented as of January 2018, are followed by very concrete objectives, such as making customer service a constant requirement by developing more and more personalised services, thanks to an ambitious digital transformation plan (€500 million over five years) or becoming a key player in the sustainable city, thanks to a vast conversion program of bus depots to electric and gas by 2025, to have a fleet of 100% clean buses. Other projects in progress: to be exemplary in terms of energy transition by reducing the Group's energy consumption by 20% and reducing greenhouse gas emissions by 20% by 2025, making RATP a champion of multimodal mobility in France and worldwide, through a policy of equity participation in start-ups and a doubling of the Group's international sales in five years, creating more and more places of social diversity in the urban landscape (bringing together maintenance, private, social & student housing, nurseries ...) just as the RATP has already demonstrated in the context of the transformation of the Lagny and Jourdan bus depots.

== Other activities ==
- Air Liquide, Independent Member of the Board of Directors (since 2023)
- Ingenico, Chair of the Supervisory Board (since 2022)
- Engie, Member of the Board of Directors (since 2015)
- Airbus, Independent Member of the Board of Directors (since 2016)
- KPN, Member of the Supervisory Board (2020–2023)
- Systra, Vice-Chairwoman of the Supervisory Board (2017–2022)
- Aéroports de Paris, Independent Member of the Board of Directors (2011–2013)
- Technicolor, Independent Member of the Board of Directors (2010–2013)

== Recognition ==
Guillouard was awarded the title of Chevalier in the National Order of Merit, on 14 November 2008.
