= Freddy Sertin =

French politician

Member of the National Assembly for Calvados's 6th constituency
- In office 24 January 2025 – 12 November 2025
- Preceded by: Élisabeth Borne
- Succeeded by: Élisabeth Borne
- In office 23 July 2022 – 9 February 2024
- Preceded by: Élisabeth Borne
- Succeeded by: Élisabeth Borne

Personal details
- Born: 7 February 1980 (age 46) Vire, France
- Party: Horizons

Freddy Sertin (born 7 February 1980) is a French politician who serves as the substitute of Élisabeth Borne in the National Assembly representing the Calvados's 6th constituency.
