= Élisabeth Borne =

Prime Minister of France from 2022 to 2024

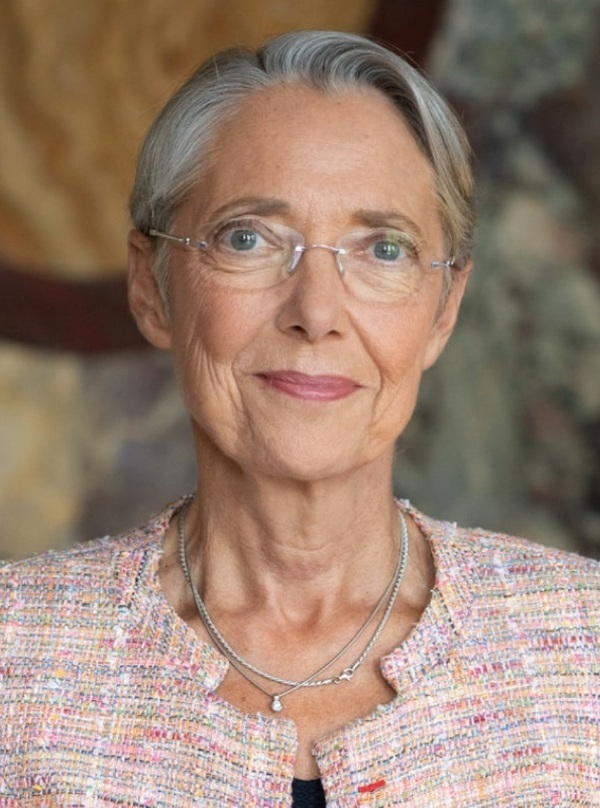
- Borne in 2022

Prime Minister of France
- In office 16 May 2022 – 9 January 2024
- President: Emmanuel Macron
- Preceded by: Jean Castex
- Succeeded by: Gabriel Attal

Minister of State Minister of National Education, Higher Education and Research
- In office 23 December 2024 – 12 October 2025
- Prime Minister: François Bayrou; Sébastien Lecornu
- Preceded by: Anne Genetet (National Education); Patrick Hetzel (Higher Education and Research)
- Succeeded by: Édouard Geffray (National Education); Philippe Baptiste (Higher Education)

Minister of the Overseas Territories
- Acting; 25 June 2022 – 4 July 2022
- Prime Minister: Herself
- Preceded by: Yaël Braun-Pivet
- Succeeded by: Jean-François Carenco

Minister of Labour, Employment and Integration
- In office 6 July 2020 – 16 May 2022
- Prime Minister: Jean Castex
- Preceded by: Muriel Pénicaud
- Succeeded by: Olivier Dussopt

Minister of Ecological and Inclusive Transition
- In office 16 July 2019 – 6 July 2020
- Prime Minister: Édouard Philippe
- Preceded by: François de Rugy
- Succeeded by: Barbara Pompili

Member of the National Assembly for Calvados's 6th constituency
- Incumbent
- Assumed office 10 February 2024
- Preceded by: Freddy Sertin
- In office 22 June 2022 – 22 July 2022
- Preceded by: Alain Tourret
- Succeeded by: Freddy Sertin

President of RATP
- In office 21 May 2015 – 17 May 2017
- Preceded by: Pierre Mongin
- Succeeded by: Catherine Guillouard

Prefect of Vienne
- In office 1 February 2013 – 23 April 2014
- Preceded by: Yves Dassonville
- Succeeded by: Christiane Barret

Personal details
- Born: Élisabeth Borne; 18 April 1961 (age 65) Paris, France
- Party: Renaissance (2017–present)
- Other political affiliations: Territories of Progress (2020–2022)
- Spouse: Olivier Allix (m. 1989; div. 2008)
- Children: 1
- Education: École Polytechnique; École des ponts ParisTech; Collège des Ingénieurs

Élisabeth Borne ([elizabɛt bɔʁn]; born 18 April 1961) is a French politician who served as Prime Minister of France from May 2022 to January 2024, becoming the second woman to hold the position of Prime Minister and the first in 30 years. From December 2024 to October 2025, she served as the Minister of National Education, Higher Education and Research in the Bayrou government and first Lecornu government. She is a member of President Emmanuel Macron's party Renaissance.

A civil engineer, government official and manager of state enterprises in the transport and construction sectors, Borne previously served as minister of transport (2017–2019) and minister of ecology (2019–2020). She was then minister of labour, employment and integration in the Castex government from 2020 to 2022. On 16 May 2022, President Macron appointed her as the next prime minister after Castex's resignation, as it is the tradition following the presidential elections in France. Borne led the centrist Ensemble coalition into the 2022 legislative election which resulted in a hung parliament: enjoying a 115-seat majority before the election, the ruling coalition was reduced to 251 seats (from 346), still emerging as the largest bloc in Parliament but 38 short of a majority. Unable to broker any deal with opposition parties to form a stable majority administration, Borne officially formed a minority government in July 2022.

Notably, as prime minister, Borne oversaw the contentious passage of a pension system reform raising the retirement age from 62 to 64, the repealing of most of the Covid-era health restrictions and the passage of a multi-year military planning law, paving way for a 40%-increase in military spending between 2024 and 2030. She also led the government's financial response to the ongoing cost-of-living crisis. In July 2023, holding onto her position as PM amid media reports of a possible dismissal, Borne reshuffled her cabinet for the second time since the beginning of her Premiership. On 8 January 2024, at Macron's request, Borne resigned as prime minister amid a major government crisis triggered by the passage of a hardline immigration bill. After leaving Matignon, she returned as an MP for her Calvados's constituency, a seat she eventually retained in the 2024 snap election. In December 2024, she returned to the cabinet as Minister of National Education, Higher Education and Research.

== Early life and education ==
Elisabeth Borne was born in Paris. Her French-born mother, Marguerite Lecèsne (1920–2015), was a pharmacist. Her father, Joseph Bornstein (1924–1972), son of Zelig Bornstein from Łuków (formerly Congress Poland), was born in Antwerp, Belgium. He fled to France at the outset of the Second World War and was active in the French Resistance. Bornstein was one of four brothers. In 1943, he was arrested by the Gestapo in Grenoble, where he was part of the French resistance and deported to Auschwitz German concentration camp. His father and younger brother were sent to the German gas chambers. Joseph and his older brother were kept alive to work in a synthetic fuel factory.

In April 1945, they met Borne's mother, Marguerite Lescène, at the platform of Paris's Orsay train station where she was helping deportees. She took the brothers to her hometown in Normandy where her family helped them rebuild their lives. Joseph Bornstein later published descriptions of the horrors he had witnessed in the Holocaust.

He was naturalised in 1950 and changed the family name to "Borne". Borne's mother ran a pharmaceutical laboratory after the war. Her father ran a rubber products factory but suffered from trauma and severe depression. He committed suicide when she was 11 years old. After his death, Borne was awarded "Ward of the Nation" education benefits which the state granted to minors who were orphaned as a result of the war or had a parent who had died in exceptional circumstances.

Borne attended high school at Lycée Janson-de-Sailly in Paris. Later, she entered the École Polytechnique (class of 1981). In 1986, she obtained her Diplôme d'Ingénieur in civil engineering from the École nationale des ponts et chaussées (National School of Road and Bridge Engineering) and one year later a Master of Business Administration (MBA) from the Collège des Ingénieurs.

== Career in the public sector ==
Borne joined the civil service as a government official at the French planning and works ministry (ministère de l'Equipement) in 1987. In the early 1990s, she was an advisor in the ministry of education under Lionel Jospin and Jack Lang (both members of the Socialist Party). From 1993 to 1996 she worked as a technical director for the public housing company Sonacotra. In 1997, prime minister Jospin appointed her as his advisor for urban planning, housing and transport.

In 2002, Borne became a strategy director and member of the executive committee at the state-owned railway company SNCF, before joining the public works construction company Eiffage as concessions manager in 2007. She worked as director of urban planning for the City of Paris under mayor Bertrand Delanoë from 2008 until 2013.

In 2013 Borne was appointed Prefect of the department Vienne and the region of Poitou-Charentes, the first woman to occupy that position. At that time, Socialist politician Ségolène Royal was president of the regional council of Poitou-Charentes. When Royal became Minister of Ecology, Sustainable Development and Energy in 2014, she appointed Borne as her chief of staff (directrice de cabinet). Borne subsequently was the President and CEO of RATP Group, a state-owned enterprise which operates public transport in Greater Paris, from 2015 to 2017.

== Political career ==
For a long time Borne was close to the Socialist Party (PS), but without formally joining the party. After Emmanuel Macron's victory in the 2017 French presidential election, she joined La République En Marche! (LREM).

=== Junior minister for Transport, 2017–2019 ===
Borne served as minister-delegate of transport in the first and second Philippe governments from May 2017 to July 2019. During her time in office, she held out against weeks of strikes and demonstrations in 2017 to end a generous pension and benefits system for SNCF railway workers.

=== Minister of Ecological and Inclusive Transition, 2019–2020 ===
After the resignation of ecology minister François de Rugy in 2019, Borne was promoted to head the ministry of the ecological and inclusive transition. In that capacity, she led efforts to pass a long-term energy planning bill aimed at increasing security of supply and a clean mobility bill committing the country to reaching carbon neutrality in the transport sector by 2050.

In 2019, Borne opposed France's ratification of the European Union–Mercosur free trade agreement.

Since 2020 Borne has additionally been a member of Territories of Progress, a centre-left party allied with LREM. In September 2022, both parties merged into the Renaissance party.

=== Minister of Labour, 2020–2022 ===
In July 2020, Borne was appointed minister of labour, employment and economic inclusion in the government of prime minister Jean Castex, succeeding Muriel Pénicaud. In that capacity, she oversaw negotiations with unions that resulted in a cut to unemployment benefits for some job seekers. During her time in office, France's unemployment rate fell to its lowest level in 15 years and youth unemployment to its lowest level in 40 years.

=== Prime minister, 2022–2024 ===
On 16 May 2022, Borne was appointed Prime Minister of France, succeeding Castex three weeks after the re-election of Macron for a second term as President of the French Republic. She is the second woman to serve as prime minister after Édith Cresson. She is also the second of Macron's prime ministers to be a member of his centrist party, after Castex.

Borne was a candidate for Renaissance (formerly known as La République En Marche!) in the 2022 French legislative election in Calvados's 6th constituency in the Normandy region in northwestern France. While remaining a candidate, under the dual mandate (cumuls des mandats) law she was not allowed to take up the position after she won the election, and was replaced by her designated alternate. She called on voters to support Macron's coalition, Ensemble Citoyens, saying it is the only group "capable of getting [a parliamentary] majority". After the first round, in relation to contests between left-wing and far-right candidates, she said: "Our position is no voice for the RN." At the same time, she expressed support only for left-wing candidates who in her view respect republican values. She was elected to Parliament in the second round. Borne offered her resignation as prime minister after the results of the second round, but was rejected by Macron, who instead tasked her to form a new cabinet.

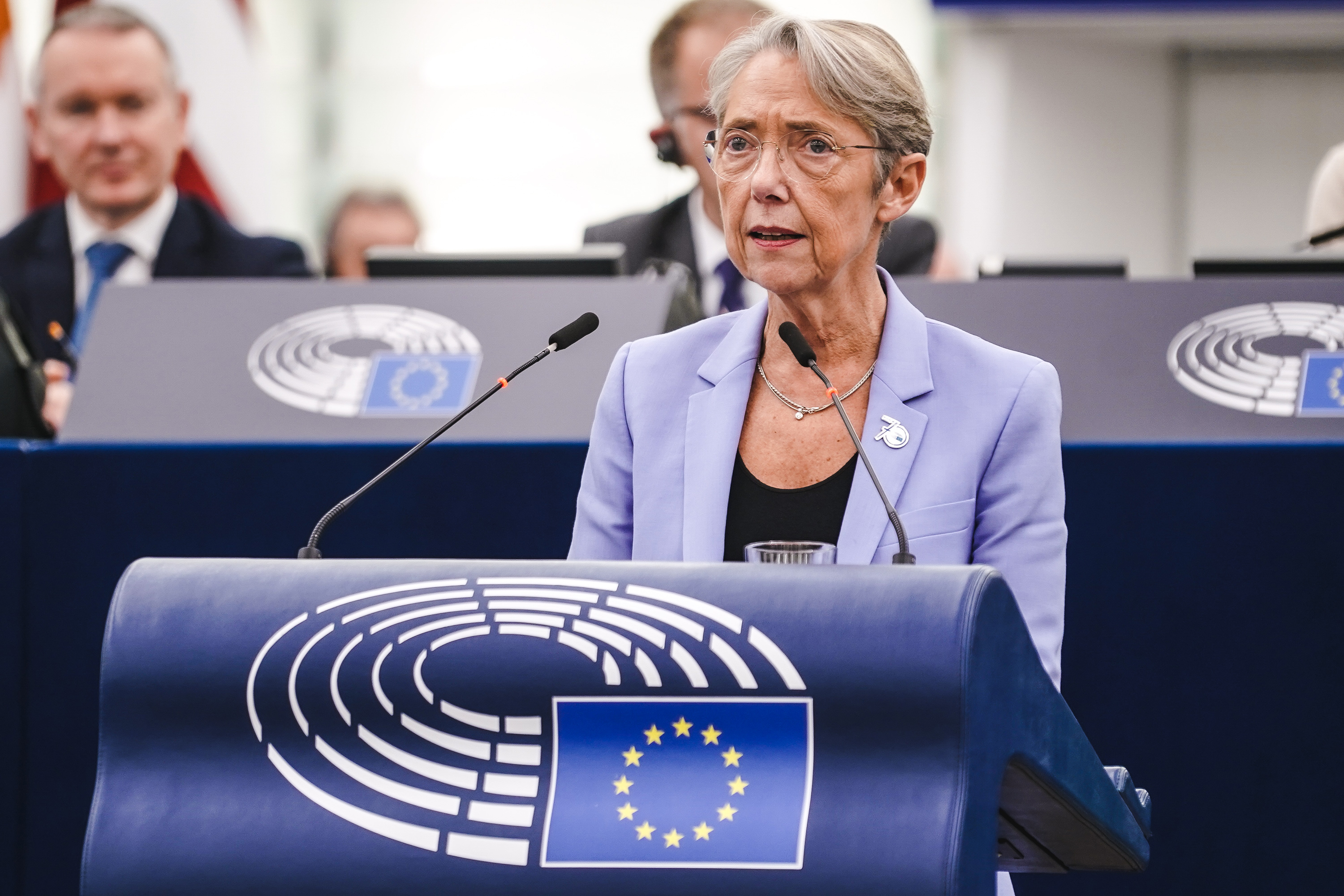
Élisabeth Borne in Strasbourg’s hemicycle in 2022

Following a cabinet reshuffle prompted by the 2022 legislative elections that resulted in a hung parliament, Borne officially formed a minority government and easily survived a motion of no confidence triggered by MPs of the New Ecologic and Social People's Union (NUPES), a broad alliance of left-wing opponents, in response to the Government's refusal to call for a vote of confidence.

In March 2023, Borne survived by nine votes another motion of no confidence brought against her in response to President Macron's passage of a law that raised the retirement age from 62 to 64 without a vote of the National Assembly.

On 12 April 2023, Borne condemned LDH for speaking out against police brutality, particularly during a protest in the village of Sainte-Soline in western France.

In May 2023, reports began circulating that Borne's government had withdrawn support for France hosting the 2025 Rugby League World Cup with her government demanding protection from financial losses if the tournament did not run at a profit. With the French organising committee unable to meet this new demand, France officially withdrew as tournament hosts on 15 May citing lack of governmental financial support as the reason.

A cabinet reshuffle was conducted in July 2023, which was described as "strange" with the fact that longtime allies of Macron were promoted and individuals with little experience were dismissed.

On 12 November 2023, she participated in the March for the Republic and Against Antisemitism in Paris in response to the rise in antisemitism since the start of the Gaza war.

On 8 January 2024, she announced her resignation and was succeeded by education minister Gabriel Attal the following day.

=== Deputy and Minister of National Education, 2024–2025 ===
News media reported that, upon her resignation, Borne turned down an invitation from President Macron to become Defense minister in the incoming Attal government.

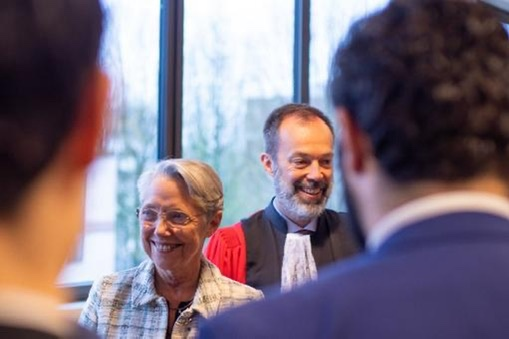
Elisabeth Borne in April 2024, three months after her resignation from Matignon

In her resignation speech, Borne announced her intention to return as an MP for her Calvados constituency, a seat she won in the 2022 legislative election. She was set to retake up her role in February 2024. On 13 February 2024, she officially began to perform the duties of a deputy in the National Assembly. In parliament, she has since been serving on the Committee on Foreign Affairs.

After President Macron dissolved the National Assembly on 9 June 2024 following the European elections, she declared herself a candidate for re-election in Calvados. She qualified for the second round with almost 29% of the vote, placing second behind RN candidate Nicolas Calbrix. The LFI-NFP candidate, Noé Gauchard, withdrew from the second round after placing third, and Borne won re-election, defeating Calbrix with 56.37% of the vote.

In August 2024, she announced her intention to run for the leadership of Renaissance.

In December 2024, Borne was named Minister of National Education, Higher Education, and Research in the Bayrou government.

== Controversies ==
=== Electronic cigarette use at the National Assembly ===
Despite the legal ban on smoking or vaping in enclosed workplaces not open to the public, Élisabeth Borne was seen vaping on several occasions at the French National Assembly and Senate.

=== Élisabeth Borne's remarks on the AAH ===
On June 7, 2022, during an interview on France Bleu, Borne was questioned by a listener named Dolorès, a woman with a disability, who denounced the unfair method of calculating the Disabled Adults' Allowance (AAH). She explained that although she was recognized as 80% disabled, she received no financial assistance due to her partner's income, leaving her in a situation of economic dependency. In response, Élisabeth Borne said she understood the difficulty of her situation but suggested that she "maybe return to work", emphasizing the importance of employment for people with disabilities. Her response deeply upset the caller, who burst into tears on air. The exchange, widely shared on social media and covered by the press, sparked a wave of public outrage. Many political figures, particularly from the left, condemned the remarks as condescending, out of touch, and disrespectful. François Ruffin described the response as "incredibly violent", while Sandrine Rousseau called it a "total lack of empathy."

=== Élisabeth Borne's Mayotte visit controversy ===
In December 2024, during a visit to Mayotte following the passage of Cyclone Chido, Minister of National Education Élisabeth Borne became embroiled in controversy. A video showing the minister turning her back on two teachers who were questioning her about the management of food aid in the shantytowns quickly went viral on social media. The exchange, filmed in front of the Kawéni 2 middle school in Mamoudzou, shows Borne responding briefly with a curt "OK" before walking away, a gesture many perceived as a lack of empathy.

In response to the uproar, the minister defended her actions by explaining that she was pressed for time and had not had the chance to inform the teachers of her scheduling constraints. She also stated that the video had been "truncated" and did not accurately reflect the full conversation. However, CheckNews obtained the full audio of the exchange, which lasts only about one minute and 45 seconds, far shorter than the five minutes initially claimed by her office. The recording reveals that the minister remained largely defensive, repeating that the aid had been distributed without addressing the teachers' criticisms. The conversation ends abruptly, with Borne offering no further responses to the concerns raised.

=== Élisabeth Borne's comments on career orientation starting in preschool ===
On April 7, 2025, during an appearance on the parliamentary television channel LCP, Élisabeth Borne sparked reactions by stating that "we must start preparing very young, almost from preschool, to think about how [students] envision themselves in a training path and a profession." These remarks were interpreted by some as an intention to introduce career guidance from preschool, prompting criticism and mockery, particularly on social media.

== Personal life ==
Borne married Olivier Allix, a lecturer and also an engineer, on 30 June 1989 with whom she later had a son, Nathan. The couple has since divorced.

Borne was admitted to hospital with COVID-19 in March 2021 and was administered oxygen.

In breaking with precedent by other French prime ministers who refrained from suing journalists, Borne asked a court in May 2023 to force the L'Archipel publishing house to cut about 200 lines in future editions of "La Secrète" (The Secretive One), a biography written by the French journalist Bérengère Bonte and mentioning intimate details of her private life.

Borne is of Jewish descent.

== Honours ==
Ribbon bar	Honour	Date and comment
	Chevalier of the Legion of Honour	12 July 2013
	Grand Cross of the National Order of Merit	22 December 2022
	Officer of the National Order of Merit	14 November 2016
	Chevalier of the National Order of Merit	6 November 2008
	Commandeur of the National Order of Maritime Merit	2019

== See also ==
- Borne government
- List of Jewish heads of state and government

Government offices
Preceded by Pierre Mongin	President of the RATP Group; 2015–2017	Succeeded by Catherine Gillouard
Political offices
Preceded by Alain Vidalies	Minister delegate of Transport; 2017–2019	Succeeded by Jean-Baptiste Djebbari
Preceded by François de Rugy	Minister of Ecological and Inclusive Transition; 2019–2020	Succeeded by Barbara Pompili
Preceded by Muriel Pénicaud	Minister of Labour, Employment and Integration; 2020–2022	Succeeded by Olivier Dussopt
Preceded by Jean Castex	Prime Minister of France; 2022–2024	Succeeded by Gabriel Attal
Preceded by Anne Genetet	Minister of National Education, Higher Education and Research; 2024–2025	Succeeded by Édouard Geffray
Order of precedence
Preceded by Jean Castex as former Prime Minister	Order of precedence in France; Former Prime Minister	Succeeded by Gabriel Attal as former Prime Minister
