= Jean Castex =

Prime Minister of France from 2020 to 2022

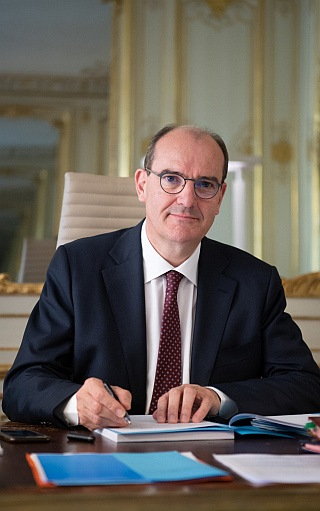
- Official portrait, 2022

Prime Minister of France
- In office 3 July 2020 – 16 May 2022
- President: Emmanuel Macron
- Preceded by: Édouard Philippe
- Succeeded by: Élisabeth Borne

President of SNCF
- Incumbent
- Assumed office 3 November 2025
- Preceded by: Jean-Pierre Farandou

President of RATP
- In office 28 November 2022 – 2 November 2025
- Preceded by: Catherine Guillouard
- Succeeded by: Jean Bassères

President of Conflent Canigó
- In office 7 January 2015 – 3 July 2020
- Preceded by: Office established
- Succeeded by: Jean-Louis Jallat

Deputy Secretary-General to the President
- In office 28 February 2011 – 15 May 2012
- President: Nicolas Sarkozy
- Preceded by: Xavier Musca
- Succeeded by: Emmanuel Macron; Nicolas Revel

Mayor of Prades
- In office 18 March 2008 – 3 July 2020
- Preceded by: Jean-François Denis
- Succeeded by: Yves Delcor

Personal details
- Born: 25 June 1965 (age 61) Vic-Fezensac, Gers, France
- Party: Independent (2020–present)
- Other political affiliations: Union for a Popular Movement (until 2015); The Republicans (2015–2020)
- Spouse: Sandra Ribelaygue
- Children: 4
- Education: University of Toulouse 2 Sciences Po; École nationale d'administration

Jean Castex ([ʒɑ̃ kastɛks]; born 25 June 1965) is a French politician who served as Prime Minister of France from 3 July 2020 to 16 May 2022. He was a member of The Republicans (LR) until 2020. Castex served for twelve years as mayor of the small town of Prades prior to his appointment as prime minister by President Emmanuel Macron. He resigned his post ahead of the 2022 legislative election. After leaving public office, he served as president of the state-owned RATP from 2022 to 2025, and has served as president of the SNCF since November 2025.

== Political career ==
Elected in 2008 as the mayor of Prades, Pyrénées-Orientales, Castex served under Health Minister Xavier Bertrand as chief of staff in François Fillon's ministry from 2010 until 2011. He succeeded Raymond Soubie as Secretary-General of the Élysée under President Nicolas Sarkozy between 2011 and 2012. In the UMP 2012 leadership primaries, he endorsed Fillon.

On the local level, Castex was a regional councillor of Languedoc-Roussillon from 2010 to 2015, and has served as department councillor of Pyrénées-Orientales since 2015. In September 2017, Castex was appointed interdepartmental delegate to the 2024 Olympics and Paralympics; he was also appointed as President of the National Sports Agency. On 2 April 2020, he was appointed coordinator of the phasing out of the lockdown implemented during the COVID-19 pandemic in France.

Castex was a member of The Republicans until early 2020, where he was regarded as being socially conservative. Following Édouard Philippe's resignation on 3 July 2020, Castex was appointed Prime Minister by President Emmanuel Macron. His appointment was described as a "doubling down on a course that is widely seen as centre-right in economic terms". Castex subsequently named his government on 6 July.

On 25 April 2022, following Macron's re-election as president, Castex agreed to resign as prime minister. Castex had previously pledged to do so if Macron was re-elected. Upon his resignation, Castex's government resigned as well, effective on 16 May.

== Life after politics ==
After leaving office, Castex was nominated by his successor Élisabeth Borne as chairman of the board of directors of the Agence de financement des infrastructures de transport de France (AFITF). He left the post on 10 November 2022, to be nominated to the PDG of the RATP, starting on the 28 November.

== Personal life ==
Castex, whose name means 'castles' in Gascon (castèths), hails from the Gers. He is married to Sandra Ribelaygue; they have four daughters.

A fluent Catalan speaker, Castex is regarded a defender of the Catalan identity in Southern France and other regional sensibilities. He is also friends with the ex-trades union leader Jean-Claude Mailly and the physician Patrick Pelloux, a former columnist at Charlie Hebdo.

Castex tested positive for COVID-19 on 23 November 2021.

== Honours ==
Ribbon bar	Honour	Date and comment
	Knight of the National Order of Merit	2006
	Knight of the Legion of Honour	2020
	Grand Cross of the National Order of Merit	2020 (ex officio)

== See also ==
- Castex government

Political offices
Preceded by Jean-François Denis	Mayor of Prades; 2008–2020	Succeeded by Yves Delcor
Preceded by Xavier Musca	Deputy Secretary-General to the President; 2011–2012	Succeeded by Emmanuel Macron
Preceded by Xavier Musca	Deputy Secretary-General to the President; 2011–2012	Succeeded by Nicolas Revel
Preceded by Édouard Philippe	Prime Minister of France; 2020–2022	Succeeded by Élisabeth Borne
Order of precedence
Preceded by Édouard Philippe as Former Prime Minister	Order of precedence in France; Former Prime Minister	Succeeded by Élisabeth Borne as Former Prime Minister
