= Commission de régulation de l'énergie =

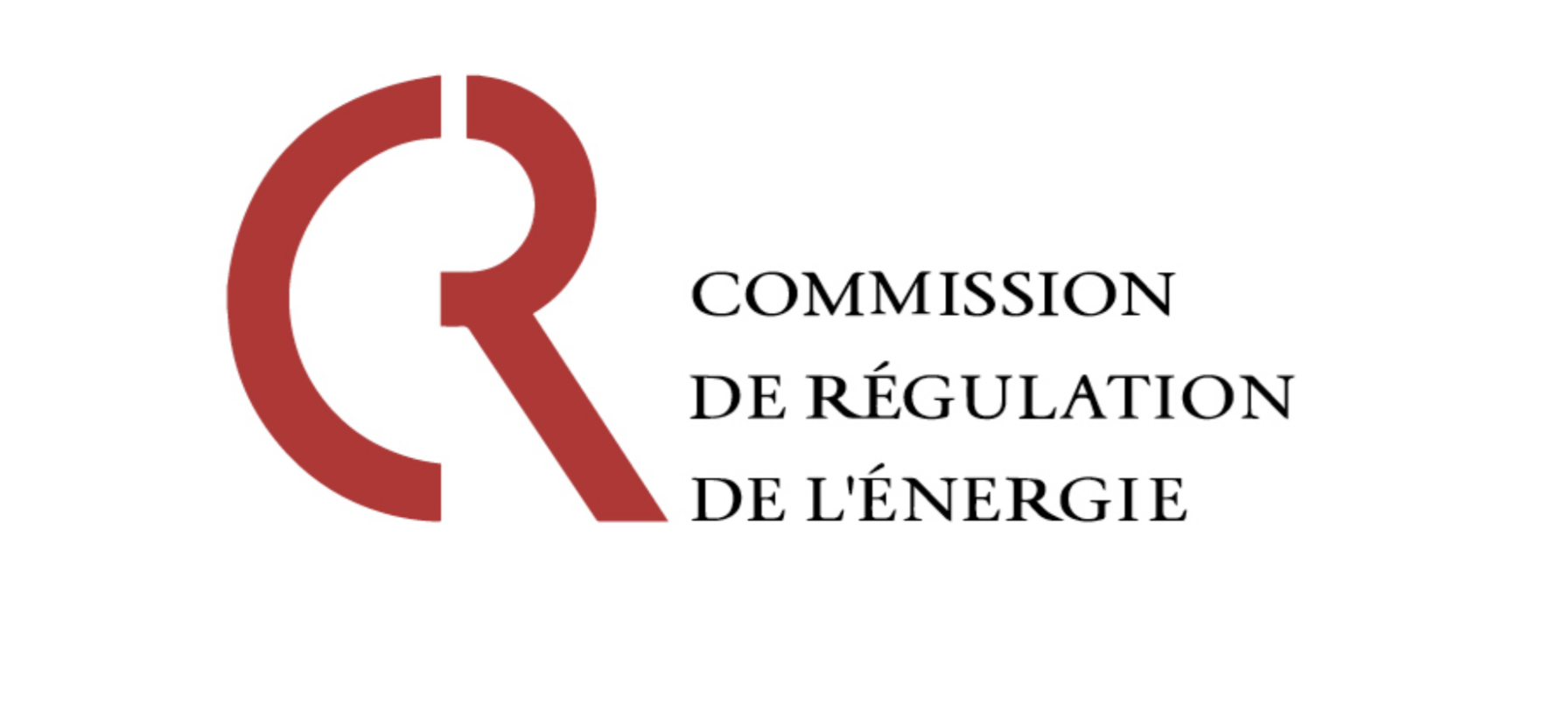
- Abbreviation: CRE
- Formation: February 10, 2000
- Type: General public administration
- Location: France
- Leader: Emmanuelle Wargon
- Website: https://www.cre.fr/

The Commission de régulation de l'énergie (CRE, [kʁø] or French Energy Regulatory Commission under its official English title) is an independent body that regulates the French electricity and gas markets. It is a member of the European Union organisation ACER and the all-European CEER (Council of European Energy Regulators).

== History ==
The commission was established by the laws of February 10, 2000, related to the modernization and development of the public electricity service, originally named "Commission de régulation de l'électricité" (Electricity Regulatory Commission), and by the law of January 3, 2003, concerning the gas and electricity markets and the public energy service. These laws transposed into French legislation the European directives of December 19, 1996, and June 22, 1998. The second law opened the gas market and extended to this sector the powers that the (CRE) already had over the electricity market.

These directives, making up the "energy package," organize the liberalization of the energy market at the European Community level by ensuring:

- the free choice of supplier for consumers;
- the freedom of establishment for producers;
- and the right of access to the distribution and transport networks under objective, transparent, and non-discriminatory conditions for all users.

To ensure transparency and non-discrimination in access to public electricity networks, the commission decided on April 7, 2004, to set up a technical reference framework for the managers of public electricity networks.

== Functions ==
According to the law of December 7, 2006, "the Energy Regulatory Commission contributes, for the benefit of final consumers, to the proper functioning of the electricity and natural gas markets. It ensures, in particular, that the conditions of access to electricity and natural gas transport and distribution networks do not hinder the development of competition. It monitors, for electricity and natural gas, the transactions carried out between suppliers, traders, and producers, the transactions carried out on organized markets, as well as exchanges across borders. It ensures the consistency of the offers from suppliers, traders, and producers with their economic and technical constraints."

== Composition ==
At its inception, the CRE was composed of six members appointed for a non-renewable six-year term: three, including the president, appointed by decree—therefore by the government—and the other three appointed respectively by the president of the Senate, the president of the National Assembly, and the president of the Economic, Social, and Environmental Council. The law of January 3, 2003, increased this number to seven: two members, including the president, appointed by decree, two others appointed by the president of the National Assembly, two by the president of the Senate, and the last by the president of the Economic and Social Council.

The law of December 7, 2006, altered the board of commissioners by appointing two vice-presidents from among the commissioners designated by the presidents of the National Assembly and the Senate, and by adding two new commissioners representing consumers, appointed by decree, which then brought the number of members to nine.

The new board of the Energy Regulatory Commission (CRE), established by the law on the new organization of the electricity market (NOME law), now consists of five members, one president, and four commissioners who serve full-time:

- The president of the CRE is appointed for a six-year term by decree of the President of the Republic after consultation with the Parliamentary committees competent in energy matters (the Economic Affairs Committee of the National Assembly and the Committee on the Economy, Sustainable Development, and Spatial Planning of the Senate);
- One commissioner is appointed by the president of the Senate for four years;
- One commissioner is appointed by the president of the National Assembly for four years;
- Two commissioners are appointed by decree after consultation with the Parliamentary committees competent in energy matters for two years.

Thus, Emmanuelle Wargon was appointed president of the CRE by Emmanuel Macron on August 16, 2022, for a six-year term. She is accompanied on the board by four commissioners:

- Anthony Cellier appointed on October 24, 2022, at the suggestion of the president of the National Assembly;
- Ivan Faucheux appointed on August 5, 2019, by decree of the President of the Republic;
- Valérie Plagnol appointed on November 2, 2021, at the suggestion of the president of the Senate;
- Lova Rinel Rajaoarinela appointed on July 26, 2023, at the suggestion of the minister in charge of overseas territories;

The presidents of the CRE since its creation are:

- 2000-2006: Jean Syrota;
- 2006-2017: Philippe de Ladoucette, formerly CEO of Charbonnages de France (appointed in 2006 and reappointed in 2011);
- 2017-2022: Jean-François Carenco. He left his position in July 2022, after joining the government.
- Since August 2022: Emmanuelle Wargon.
