= Claire Guichard =

French politician (born 1967)

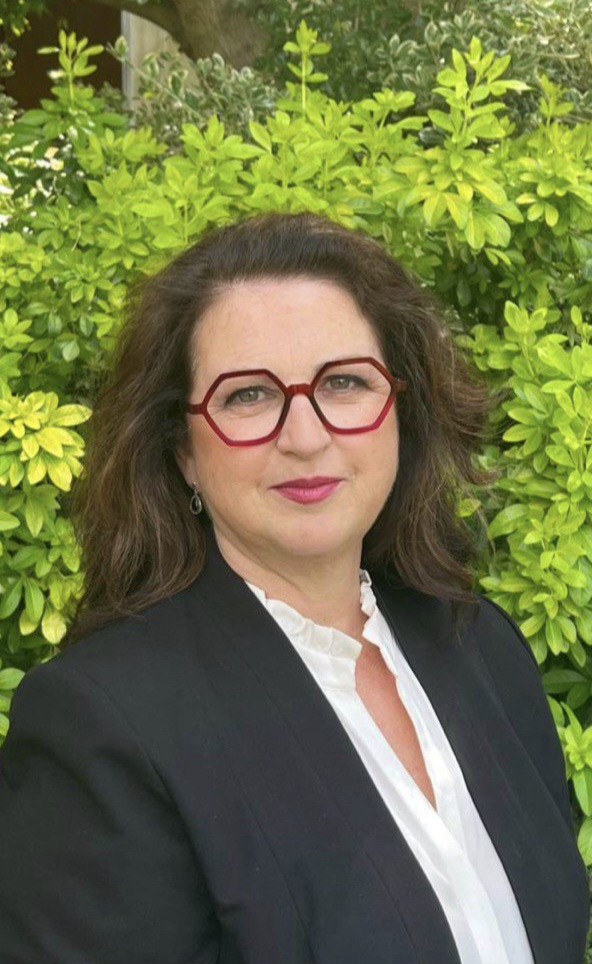

Member of the National Assembly for Hauts-de-Seine's 10th constituency
- In office 23 July 2022 – 9 June 2024
- Preceded by: Gabriel Attal
- Succeeded by: Gabriel Attal

Personal details
- Born: 30 May 1967 (age 59) Saint-Pierre, Saint Pierre and Miquelon
- Party: Renaissance

Claire Guichard (born 30 May 1967) is a French politician of Renaissance. She was the substitute candidate for future Prime Minister of France Gabriel Attal during the 2022 French legislative elections, and became the Member of Parliament for Hauts-de-Seine's 10th constituency when he was appointed to the Borne government on 23 July 2022.

== Early life and career ==
Claire Guichard was director of the Cultural and Sports Center of Saint-Pierre-et-Miquelon between 1994 and 1996. She left the archipelago at the age of 30 and settled in mainland France. She has nevertheless declared that she maintains a link with her island of birth.

== Political career ==
=== Locally elected in Issy-les-Moulineaux ===
In the 2001 French municipal elections, she became a municipal councillor in Issy-les-Moulineaux, elected on the list of André Santini (right-wing list). Following the 2008 French municipal elections she became deputy mayor of Issy-les-Moulineaux, particularly responsible for early childhood and youth. In 2015, its functions expanded, becoming responsible for health and sustainable development. In 2020, she was re-elected deputy mayor, this time in charge of tourism and international relations. As part of her duties, she is also elected president of the Pays Korea group at Cités unies France.

In the context of the law on the accumulation of mandates and her election as a deputy, she resigned from her position as deputy in July 2022 but remains a municipal councillor.

=== MP in Hauts-de-Seine ===
As a member of La République en Marche (LREM), she was the substitute for Gabriel Attal in Hauts-de-Seine's 10th constituency during the 2022 French legislative election. Following his election victory, Attal was appointed to the Borne government meaning that Guichard took his place in Parliament.

In the National Assembly, she sits with the Renaissance group and is a member of the Social Affairs Committee. In Parliament she is also the whip of the Renaissance group for the deputies who are members of the Social Affairs Committee.

== Controversy ==
On 27 January 2023, during the examination of the 2023 French pension reform law, presented by the government of Élisabeth Borne, she made controversial comments on disability benefits. This declaration raised numerous comments from those opposed to the reform including Minister of Culture Rachida Dati. The next day, she apologized “to those [whom her comments] offended” on her Twitter account.

== Election results ==
=== Municipal elections ===
Year	Party and coalition	Municipality	Roster position	1st ^{round} _			
Year	Party and coalition	Municipality	Roster position	Voice	%	Rank	Issue
2001	UDF - RPR - DL	Issy-les-Moulineaux	NC	12,712	70.24	1st ^{_}	Elected
2008	Presidential majority	Issy-les-Moulineaux	12th ^{_}	12,150	56.76	1st ^{_}	Elected
2014	UMP - UDI - MoDem	Issy-les-Moulineaux	4th ^{_}	16,037	67.03	1st ^{_}	Elected
2020	UDI - LREM - LR	Issy-les-Moulineaux	10th ^{_}	10,301	60.26	1st ^{_}	Elected

=== Parliamentary elections ===
Year	Party and coalition	Constituency	Candidate	Substitute	1st round			2nd round		
Year	Party and coalition	Constituency	Candidate	Substitute	Voice	%	Rank	Voice	%	Issue
2022	LREM (ENS)	Hauts-de-Seine's 10th constituency	Gabriel Attal	Claire Guichard	20,679	48.06	1st ^{_}	24,047	59.85	1st

== See also ==
- List of deputies of the 16th National Assembly of France
