= Fondation Hamon affair =

The Fondation Hamon affair was a French political scandal surrounding the Fondation Hamon, a project to build a modern art museum on île Saint-Germain at Issy-les-Moulineaux, later abandoned.

The project was initiated by Jean Hamon, who had made his fortune in property development, and his gift to the Conseil général of Hauts-de-Seine of nearly 200 paintings and sculptures with a total value of 7.5 million Euros, stored at Hamon's castle at Bullion (Yvelines). That Conseil général was then presided over by Charles Pasqua. A mixed syndicate, with Charles Pasqua and André Santini (UDF deputy mayor of Issy-les-Moulineaux) as co-presidents, was created in 2000. In 2003, a judge in Versailles was surprised to see the département invest (without control over the funds) 800,000 Euros for the storage and conservation of the works. Charles Pasqua and André Santini, as well as many other civil servants, were indicted in the case in mid-2003. Also, Nicolas Sarkozy could also be involved in the affair, according to Libération, since the Conseil général continued to make such payments to Hamon for a year after Sarkozy became its president. The mixed syndicate had to pay expenses to Hamon until 2011. The foundation collapsed and its construction permit was cancelled after an appeal launched by ecologists and local residents.

== Course ==
The affair began in May 2003 after Hamon's accountant confessed. The judge suspected him of having inflated the costs. Jean Hamon had received nearly 750,000 from public funds.

Since mid-2003 several investigations into embezzlement of public funds were put in place by judge Nathalie Andreassian, particularly into politicians and civil servants of the Conseil général des Hauts-de-Seine.

== Results ==
- Jean Hamon was indicted for misuse of stolen public funds.
- Charles Pasqua was UMP senator for Hauts-de-Seine. Indicted on 23 May 2006 for 'illegally taking interest'
- André Santini, Nouveau Centre mayor by Issy-les-Moulineaux (Hauts-de-Seine), indicted on 3 June for 'illegally taking interest'

== Sources ==
- Le rapport qui accable Pasqua et Santini JdD, 28 October 2007
- André Santini mis en examen dans l'affaire de la fondation Hamon, AFP, 3 June 2006
- Fondation Hamon: Charles Pasqua mis en examen, AP, 23 May 2006
- A Issy-les-Moulineaux, la gabegie de Pasqua et Santini, Libération, 7 April 2004
- Un mécène en prison, Journal du Dimanche, 28 September 2003
