= Jean Hamon (philanthropist) =

French philanthropist (1935–2020)

- Born: 1935
- Died: 2020; France
- Occupation: Philanthropist

Jean Hamon (22 March 1935 - 18 October 2020) was a French developer and millionaire patron of the arts. He is notable as one of the builders of the La Défense area of Paris and (in 1990) temporary co-owner with the Labeyrie group of the Parisian cabaret L'Alcazar. He gave nearly 200 paintings and sculptures, with an estimated total value of 7.5 million Euros, which were going to become the foundational collection of a planned modern art museum on île Saint-Germain at Issy-les-Moulineaux, but he and they became entangled in the Fondation Hamon affair.
