= Valérie André =

French Resistance member and aviator (1922–2025)

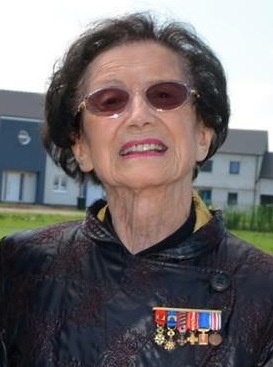
- André in 2014
- Born: 21 April 1922; Strasbourg, France
- Died: 21 January 2025 (aged 102); Issy-les-Moulineaux, France
- Relatives: André Santini (nephew)
- Military career
- Allegiance: France
- Branch: French Army
- Service years: 1948–1981
- Rank: Médecin Général Inspecteur
- Awards: Légion d'honneur ordre national du Mérite; Croix de Guerre 1939-1945; Croix de guerre T.O.E; Croix de la Valeur Militaire; Médaille commémorative d'Indochine; Médaille de l'Aéronautique; Croix du Combattant Volontaire; Médaille de Vermeil du service de santé

Valérie André (French pronunciation: [valeʁi ɑ̃dʁe]; 21 April 1922 – 21 January 2025) was a neurosurgeon, aviator, and the first female member of the French military to achieve the rank of General Officer, in 1976, as Physician General. In 1981, she was promoted to Inspector General of Medicine. A helicopter pilot, she is the first woman to have piloted a helicopter in a combat zone. She was also a founding member of the Académie de l'air et de l'espace.

As a member of the military, she was not addressed as "Madame la Générale" (a term reserved for spouses of generals) but as "General".

== Military career ==
André started as a Medical Captain in Indochina in 1948, already a qualified parachutist and pilot, in addition to being an army surgeon. While in Indochina, she realized that the most difficult part of her duties was retrieving the wounded, who were often trapped in the jungle. She returned to France to learn how to pilot a helicopter, then flew one to Indochina. From 1952 to 1953, she piloted 129 helicopter missions into the jungle, rescuing 165 soldiers, and on two occasions completed parachute jumps to treat wounded soldiers who needed immediate surgery.

One typical mission occurred on 11 December 1951, when casualties were in urgent need of evacuation from Tu Vu on the Black River. The only available helicopter, stationed near Saigon, was dismantled, flown to Hanoi by a Bristol Freighter and reassembled. Captain André then flew into Tu Vu despite heavy mist and anti-aircraft fire. There, she triaged the casualties, operated on the most pressing cases and then flew the urgent wounded back to Hanoi, two at a time. Later, she was put in command of a casualty evacuation flight.

André continued in Algeria as a Medical Commander in 1960, where she completed 365 war missions. She rose to the rank of Medical Lieutenant Colonel in 1965 then to Medical Colonel in 1970. She had a total of 3,200 flight hours, and received 7 citations of the Croix de Guerre.

André is one of eight women to hold the Grand-croix (Great Cross) rank in the Legion of Honour, with Germaine Tillion, Geneviève de Gaulle-Anthonioz, Jacqueline de Romilly, Simone Rozès, Christiane Desroches Noblecourt, Yvette Farnoux and Gilberte Champion.

== Personal life ==
Valérie André was the aunt of politician André Santini. She wrote two collections of memoirs: Ici, Ventilateur! Extraits d'un carnet de vol. (Calmann-Lévy, 1954) and Madame le général (Perrin, 1988).

She died in Issy-les-Moulineaux on 21 January 2025, at the age of 102.

== Decorations ==
French

- Grand-croix of the Legion of Honour (19 December 1999); previously Chevalier on 25 February 1953
- Grand-croix of the Ordre National du Mérite in 1987, the first woman to receive this distinction.
- Croix de Guerre 1939-1945 with 7 citations.
- Croix de Guerre des Théâtres d'opérations extérieures
- Médaille de la Valeur Militaire
- Médaille commémorative d'Indochine,
- Médaille de l'Aéronautique
- Médaille du Combattant Volontaire (1944),
- Médaille de Vermeil du service de santé.
- Grande Médaille d'or du l'Aéro-club de France

Foreign decorations

- Legion of Merit (USA)
- National Order of Vietnam
- Cross of Valour (Canada)
