= Jean Hamon =

Jean Hamon may refer to:

- Jean Hamon (doctor) (1618–1687), French doctor
- Jean Hamon (philanthropist), French millionaire real estate dealer and arts patron
