= Gabriel Attal =

Prime Minister of France in 2024

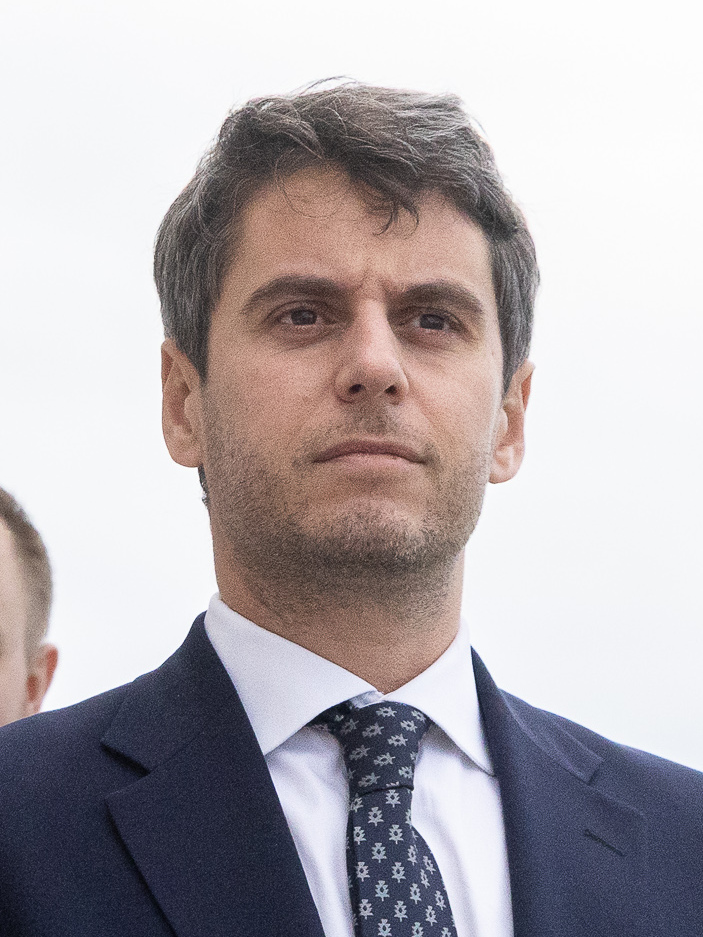
- Attal in 2026

Prime Minister of France
- In office 9 January 2024 – 5 September 2024
- President: Emmanuel Macron
- Preceded by: Élisabeth Borne
- Succeeded by: Michel Barnier

General Secretary of Renaissance
- Incumbent
- Assumed office 8 December 2024
- Preceded by: Stéphane Séjourné

President of the Renaissance group in the National Assembly
- Incumbent
- Assumed office 5 September 2024
- Preceded by: Sylvain Maillard
Ministerial positions
Minister of National Education and Youth
In office 20 July 2023 – 9 January 2024
Prime Minister	Élisabeth Borne
Preceded by	Pap Ndiaye
Succeeded by	Amélie Oudéa-Castéra
Minister of Public Action and Accounts
In office 20 May 2022 – 20 July 2023
Prime Minister	Élisabeth Borne
Preceded by	Olivier Dussopt
Succeeded by	Thomas Cazenave
Spokesperson of the Government
In office 6 July 2020 – 20 May 2022
Prime Minister	Jean Castex
Preceded by	Sibeth Ndiaye
Succeeded by	Olivia Grégoire

Secretary of State to the Minister of National Education and Youth
- In office 16 October 2018 – 6 July 2020
- Prime Minister: Édouard Philippe
- Preceded by: Position established
- Succeeded by: Sarah El Haïry

Spokesperson of La République En Marche!
- In office 4 January 2018 – 16 October 2018
- Preceded by: Benjamin Griveaux
- Succeeded by: Laetitia Avia

Member of the National Assembly for Hauts-de-Seine's 10th constituency
- Incumbent
- Assumed office 8 July 2024
- Preceded by: Claire Guichard
- In office 22 June 2022 – 22 July 2022
- Preceded by: Florence Provendier
- Succeeded by: Claire Guichard
- In office 21 June 2017 – 16 November 2018
- Preceded by: André Santini
- Succeeded by: Florence Provendier

Member of the Vanves municipal council
- Incumbent
- Assumed office 30 March 2014

Personal details
- Born: Gabriel Nissim Attal; 16 March 1989 (age 37) Clamart, France
- Party: Renaissance (since 2016)
- Other political affiliations: Socialist (2006–2016)
- Domestic partner: Stéphane Séjourné (2015–2022, since 2024) (Pacs)
- Education: École alsacienne
- Alma mater: Sciences Po

Gabriel Nissim Attal (French: [ɡabʁijɛl atal]; born 16 March 1989) is a French politician who has served as the General Secretary of Renaissance since December 2024 and president of the Renaissance group in the National Assembly since September 2024. He previously served as the prime minister of France from January to September 2024. He was the youngest and the first openly gay prime minister in French history. He previously served in various ministerial positions.

Following his election to the National Assembly in the 2017 French legislative election, Attal became the junior minister to the minister of national education and youth in 2018, which made him the youngest person to serve in the Government of France since the establishment of the Fifth Republic. He later served as the spokesperson of the government in 2020; the minister of public action and accounts in 2022; and the minister of national education and youth in 2023. On 9 January 2024, amid a major government crisis, Attal was appointed to replace Élisabeth Borne as the prime minister by French president Emmanuel Macron, at age 34.

Attal led the ruling Ensemble coalition into the legislative election in June 2024 after Macron dissolved the National Assembly following the defeat in the earlier European Parliament election. The snap election resulted in another hung parliament and electoral defeat for the government. Attal resigned as prime minister in July and remained as head of a caretaker government until Michel Barnier succeeded him on 5 September 2024.

In May 2026, Attal announced his candidancy for the 2027 French presidential election.

== Early life and education ==
Attal was born on 16 March 1989 in Clamart, Île-de-France. He grew up in the 13th and 14th arrondissements of Paris with three sisters. His father, Yves Attal, was a lawyer and film producer; his mother, Marie de Couriss, (Note: When his parents divorced, Attal informally added de Couriss to his name.) worked as an employee of a film production company. Attal's father was Jewish, of Sephardic Jewish and Alsatian Jewish descent. His mother is of French and Greek-Russian ancestry from Odesa, her grandfather having arrived in France as a White Russian émigré. Genealogists have found both French and Russian nobility, including members of the La Forest-Divonne family in France and the House of Golitsyn and the House of Dolgorukov in Russia, amongst her ancestors. Through his mother, Attal is descended from King Charles VI of France. Attal was raised in his mother's Orthodox Christian faith.

Attal attended the École alsacienne, an exclusive private school in the 6th arrondissement of Paris. He obtained a Baccalauréat with a mention très bien in 2007. He went on to study law at Panthéon-Assas University from 2008 to 2011, and earned a Master of Public Affairs from Sciences Po in 2012. He also spent a year (2009–2010) working with Éric de Chassey, director of the French Academy in Rome.

His earliest political activity was participation in the 2006 youth protests in France. Taking up a place at Sciences Po in 2007, he created a committee for the support of Íngrid Betancourt, the Franco-Colombian hostage held by the FARC.

== Political career ==
=== Early political career ===
After an internship at the French National Assembly with Marisol Touraine during the 2012 presidential campaign, Attal worked for five years as an assistant to the Minister of Health, a role which involved parliamentary liaison and speechwriting.

In the 2014 municipal elections, Attal was placed fifth on the Socialist Party list. He was elected as one of the four Socialist Party councillors of Vanves and took over the lead of the opposition, after the resignation of the head of the socialist list.

=== Member of the National Assembly (2017–2018) ===
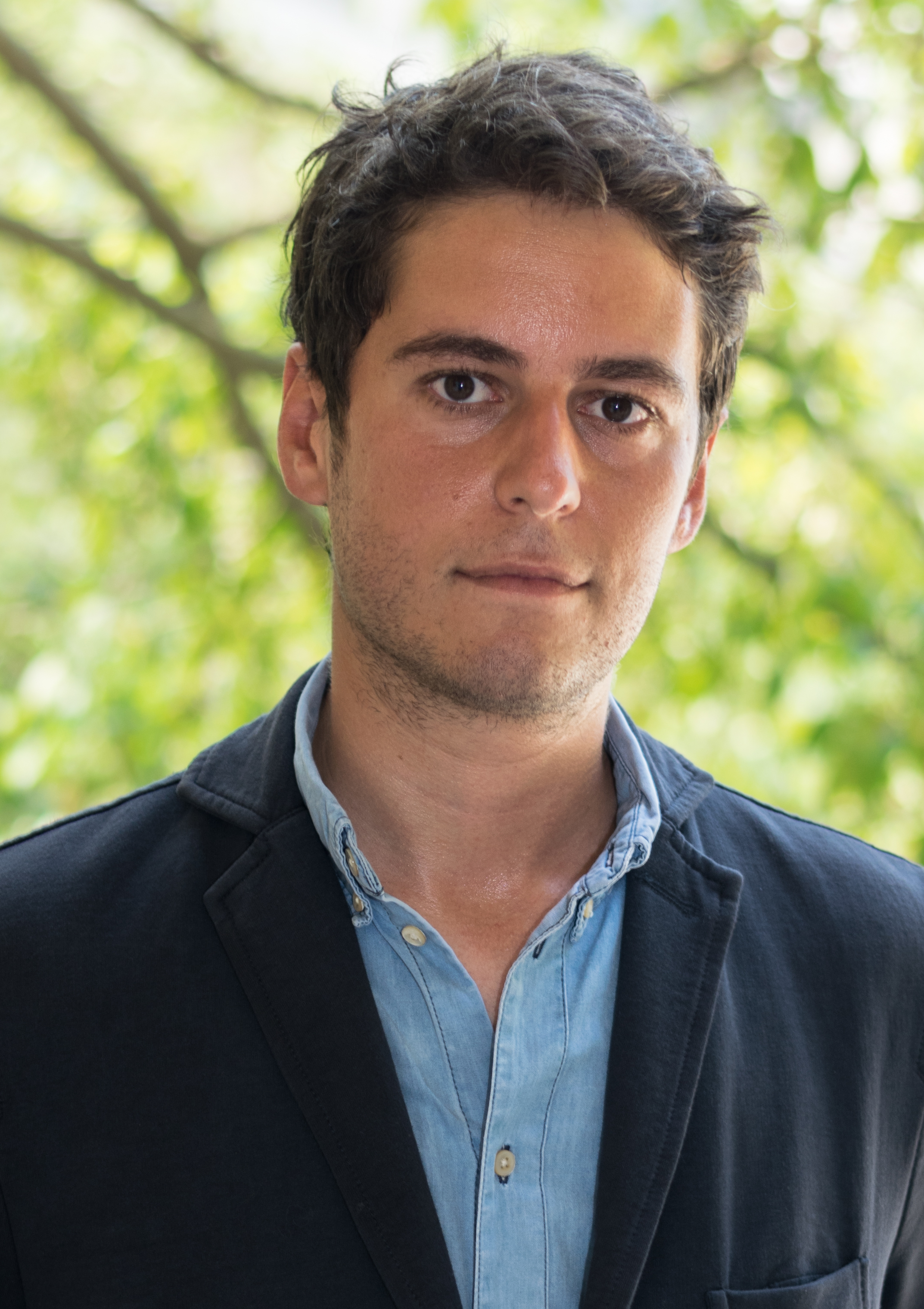
Attal in 2017

Attal was elected to the French National Assembly on 18 June 2017, representing the Hauts-de-Seine's 10th constituency, winning out over the designated successor of André Santini.

Attal was quickly considered one of the most talented new members of parliament, with Amélie de Montchalin. As a deputy of the National Assembly, he became a member of the Committee on Cultural and Education Affairs, where he served as whip of the group La République En Marche!.

In December 2017, Attal was appointed rapporteur on a bill on access to higher education.

Attal was named chairperson of La République En Marche! in January 2018 and in September 2018, after the election of Richard Ferrand to the presidency of the National Assembly, he ran as a candidate to succeed him as president of the group La République En Marche!, but withdrew his candidacy the day before the election when he was considered one of the three favourites. He later endorsed Roland Lescure.

=== Government minister (2018–2024) ===
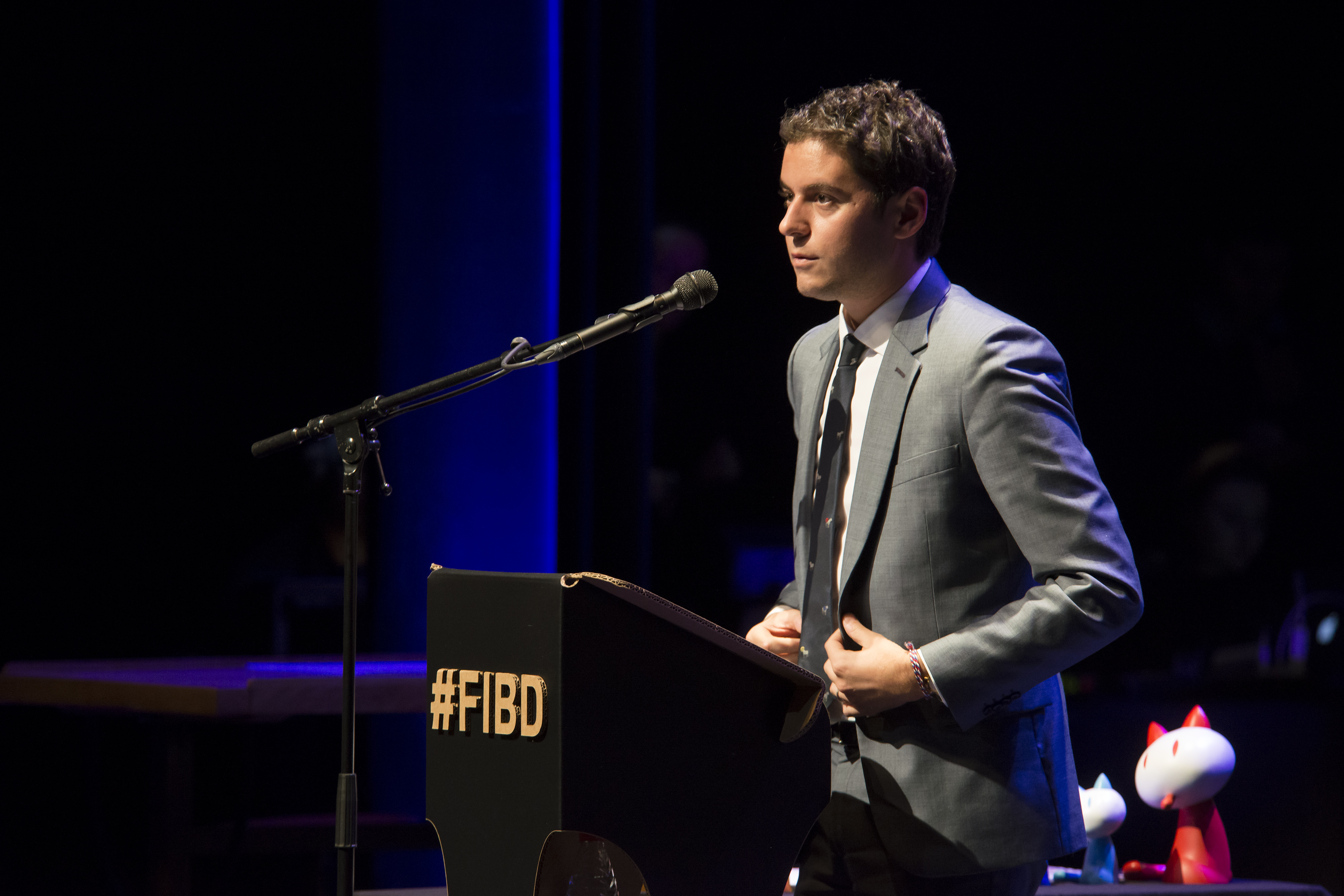
Attal in 2019

On 16 October 2018, Attal was appointed Secrétaire d'État (junior minister) to the Minister of National Education and Youth Jean-Michel Blanquer. At 29, he was the youngest member of a government under the Fifth Republic, beating the previous record set by François Baroin in 1995 by a few months. As a junior minister, he was responsible for youth issues and setting up universal national service. From 2020 to 2022, he was the government spokesperson under Prime Minister Jean Castex. He became Minister of Public Action and Accounts in the government of Prime Minister Élisabeth Borne in May 2022.

In July 2023, Attal was appointed minister of national education and youth in the 2023 French government reshuffle. At the age of 34, he became the youngest person to hold that office under the Fifth Republic.

== Prime Minister (2024) ==
Attal in 2024

Following Borne's resignation as prime minister on 8 January 2024, media sources announced Attal as favourite to succeed her. His appointment as prime minister was announced on 9 January 2024. At the age of 34, he became the youngest and the first openly gay person to hold the office in France.

Lacking a parliamentary majority as a result of the 2022 legislative election, Attal formed a minority government, the second one since the start of the Macron Presidency. He appointed what was widely described as the most right-leaning cabinet since Macron took office, with over half of his senior ministers previously coming from the conservative UMP/LR party.

At the beginning of his tenure as prime minister, Attal was seen as one of the most popular politicians in France. The French media speculated that he was a potential contender in the 2027 presidential election. (Note: Macron is not eligible for a third consecutive term in office; the president of France is only allowed two consecutive five-year terms in office and Macron was elected in 2017 and 2022.) On 16 January 2024, Attal announced that, like Élisabeth Borne before him, he would not be seeking a vote of confidence in the National Assembly as implicitly allowed in the French Constitution.

On 9 June 2024, Macron called a snap election after his party's disappointing results in the 2024 European Parliament election. Although he was not in agreement with Macron's decision, Attal took on the leadership of Macron's Ensemble alliance's election campaign. In the first round of voting on 30 June, Ensemble won only 20.0% of the votes, in third place behind the far-right National Rally (RN) with 33.3% and the left-wing alliance New Popular Front (NFP) with 28.0%, which constituted the worst electoral performance for a ruling coalition in a general election since the establishment of the Third Republic in 1870. Attal said that the priority was to prevent NR from gaining an absolute majority in the National Assembly and asked Ensemble candidates in third place against NR in their constituencies to withdraw from the second round of voting. The second round of voting on 7 July resulted in Ensemble winning 168 seats, behind NFP with 182 and ahead of RN with 143. Attal offered his resignation to the president the following morning, only for it to be refused by Macron, who asked him to stay on for the time being in order to maintain the stability of the country. Attal retained his own seat in the Hauts-de-Seine's 10th constituency with 58.2% of the vote in a contest against NFP candidate Cécile Soubelet.

On 13 July 2024, Attal was elected unopposed as leader of the Renaissance Party in the National Assembly with the support of 84 of the 98 Renaissance members. Macron formally accepted Attal's resignation on 16 July 2024, but at the same time asked him to remain in place as head of a caretaker government.

=== Post-premiership (2024–present) ===
On 5 September 2024, President Macron appointed Michel Barnier as the new prime minister. At the handover ceremony the following day, Attal made a speech in which he expressed his frustration at having had only eight months in office – too little time to see any of his plans come to fruition. On leaving the office of prime minister, he took on leadership of Macron's party in the National Assembly.

In 2025, Attal proposed a bill to outlaw the wearing of an Islamic headscarf by minors in public spaces. He stated: "No one can believe that a little girl chooses to wear a veil; it is obviously something imposed upon her."

In May 2026, Attal formally launched his candidacy for the 2027 French presidential election. During his announcement, he voiced support for starting a national debate in France over surrogacy, a move which drew condemnation from various ministers in both sides of the political aisle. Civil society groups warned that the legislation of surrogacy in France would have ramifications across Europe.

== Political positions ==
=== Domestic policy ===
Attal supports a more controlled approach to immigration, with a greater emphasis on labour immigration while reducing and more tightly regulating family reunification. He is a strong supporter of laïcité (French secularism). As Minister of National Education, he notably introduced a ban on abayas in public schools, arguing that the measure was necessary to uphold secularism in the education system.

Attal has advocated policies aimed at encouraging recipients of social benefits to return to employment. He supported extending the reform of the Revenu de solidarité active (RSA), including a requirement for beneficiaries to undertake at least 15 hours per week of employment, training, or other integration-related activities. He has also opposed experiments with a four-day workweek.

Attal is strongly supportive of nuclear power and has called for the construction of 14 new nuclear reactors in France. His environmental record as Prime Minister has attracted criticism. In 2024, his government suspended and subsequently modified the Ecophyto programme aimed at reducing pesticide use, following pressure from the agricultural sector. His government also introduced significant budget reductions affecting environmental programmes, including cuts to the Green Fund. At the same time, Attal has supported the continued development of renewable energy alongside nuclear power.

In education, Attal has supported greater differentiation between pupils according to academic level and has proposed measures aimed at reducing the concentration of disadvantaged pupils in so-called "ghetto" middle schools. He has also proposed restricting children's access to social media, including a ban on access for those under 15, alongside broader measures intended to reduce excessive screen use among young people.

Attal supports the legalisation of euthanasia.

=== Foreign policy ===
Attal is a strong supporter of Ukraine in the wake of Russia’s invasion, arguing that financial support for Ukraine should be viewed as an investment rather than an expense. He has also expressed support for seizing Russian assets held in France. In March 2025, he called for Europe to use more than €200 billion in frozen Russian assets to support Ukraine's war effort.

Attal is strongly pro-European and has advocated for a more integrated United States of Europe capable of standing up to both China and the United States. He also supports the concept of a multi-speed Europe, arguing that a smaller group of EU member states should take the lead in establishing a Capital Markets Union.

Following the October 7 attacks, Attal strongly condemned Hamas. In May 2024, he opposed unilateral French recognition of Palestine. During the 2024 pro-Palestinian protests at Sciences Po, he criticized what he described as antisemitic incidents.

== Personal life ==
In 2018, Attal was outed on Twitter by his former École alsacienne classmate Juan Branco. Attal lived in a civil union with Stéphane Séjourné at the time. Their relationship had ended by 2022. They got back together in 2024.

When they were both attending the École alsacienne, Attal had a relationship with singer Joyce Jonathan, but Jonathan said that the relationship was merely "a joke between us" and "a playtime crush".

Attal said in a TV interview that he had been subjected to homophobic bullying at school, implying that the culprit was Branco, though Branco denied this. He has also described being the target of homophobic and antisemitic hate speech on social media as a politician.

Though baptized as a member of the Russian Orthodox Church, Attal considers himself an atheist.

== See also ==
- List of openly LGBT heads of state and government
- List of state leaders by age: youngest serving state leaders
- Second Philippe government – Government of France (2017–2020)

== Notes ==
Political offices
Preceded by Sibeth Ndiaye	Spokesperson of the Government; 2020–2022	Succeeded by Olivia Grégoire
Preceded by Olivier Dussopt	Minister of Public Action and Accounts; 2022–2023	Succeeded by Thomas Cazenave
Preceded by Pap Ndiaye	Minister of National Education and Youth; 2023–2024	Succeeded by Amélie Oudéa-Castéra
Preceded by Élisabeth Borne	Prime Minister of France; 2024	Succeeded by Michel Barnier
Party political offices
Preceded by Stéphane Séjourné	General Secretary of Renaissance; 2024–present	Incumbent
Order of precedence
Preceded by Élisabeth Borne as former Prime Minister	Order of precedence in France; Former Prime Minister	Succeeded by Michel Barnier as former Prime Minister
