= Florence Provendier =

French politician

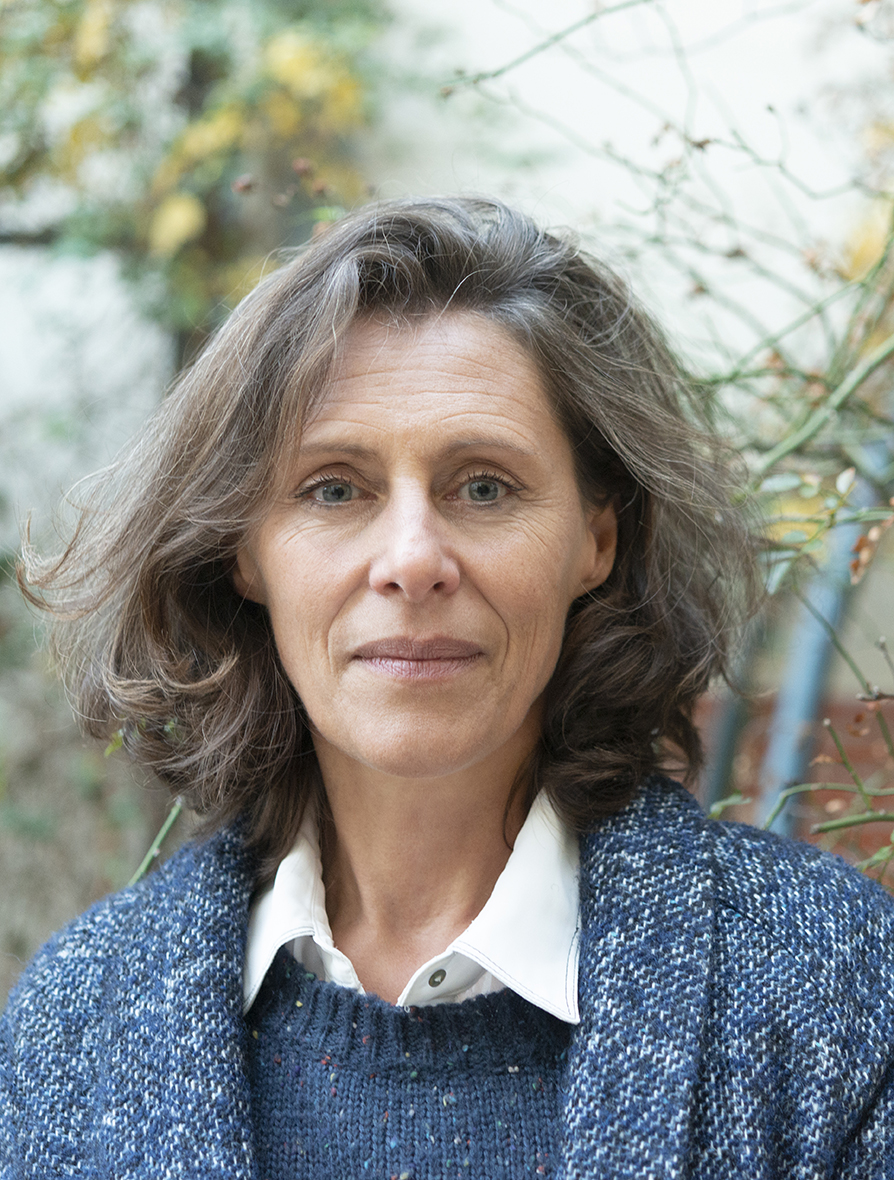

Member of the National Assembly for Hauts-de-Seine's 10th constituency
- In office 17 November 2018 – 21 June 2022
- Preceded by: Gabriel Attal
- Succeeded by: Gabriel Attal

Personal details
- Born: 28 October 1965 (age 60) Saint-Denis, Seine-Saint-Denis, France
- Party: Renaissance
- Education: ESSEC Business School

Florence Provendier (French pronunciation: [flɔʁɑ̃s pʁɔvɑ̃dje]; born 28 October 1965) is a French politician who was Member of Parliament for Hauts-de-Seine's 10th constituency from 2018 to 2022.

== Education ==
She graduated from ESSEC Business School.

== Political career ==
In the 2017 French legislative election, she was a substitute candidate. She replaced Gabriel Attal in Parliament when he was appointed Government Spokesperson.

== See also ==
- List of deputies of the 15th National Assembly of France
