= Lycée Eugène-Ionesco =

School in Issy-les-Moulineaux, France

Coordinates: 48.8190°N 2.2540°E

Lycée Eugène-Ionesco is a senior high-school in the commune of Issy-les-Moulineaux, Hauts-de-Seine, in the Paris metropolitan area of France.

== Infrastructure ==
It consists of a single U-shaped building of four storeys and possesses a small, roughly 10-meter-radius wide patch of grass and some trees, on which stepping is forbidden.

The rooms are numbered 1 to 416, with the first number always mirroring the floor it is on. The third floor hosts science labs as well as equipment storage.

== Notable events ==
The school population increased after a 2000s "baby boom" in the area, causing the school to become overcrowded by 2015. The school administration around that time fought so that they would be allowed to keep their Bac Pro programme.

The school's new campus was scheduled to open in 2018, with portable buildings used in the interim.

The school is ranked 20 out of 72 in the Hauts-de-Seine high school rankings, and 248 in the national ranking, based on the success rates of the Baccalauréat.
