= Hamidou Tangara =

Footballer (born 1976)

Personal information
- Date of birth: 12 November 1976 (age 49)
- Place of birth: Issy-les-Moulineaux, France
- Position: Goalkeeper

Senior career*
Years	Team	Apps	(Gls)
–1999	Paris Saint-Germain B		
1999–2000	Plymouth	0	(0)
2000–2001	Northampton	0	(0)
2001	Cambridge United	0	(0)
2002	Sutton United	0	(0)
2003–2004	Luçon		
2004–2005	Trélissac		
2005–2006	Racing Club de France		
2006–2007	FC Mantois		

International career
2004	Mali	1	(0)
- * Club domestic league appearances and goals

Hamidou Tangara (born 12 November 1976) is a former professional footballer who played as a goalkeeper. Born in Issy-les-Moulineaux, France, he made one appearance for the Mali national team.

== Career ==
Tangara started his career with French fourth tier side Paris Saint-Germain B. In 2003, he signed for Luçon in the French fifth tier. After that, Tangara signed for French fourth tier club Racing Club de France. In 2006, he signed for FC Mantois in the French fifth tier.
