= Hauts-de-Seine's 10th constituency =

Constituency of the National Assembly of France

10th constituency of Hauts-de-Seine
- inline Constituency of the National Assembly of France

- Deputy: Gabriel Attal; RE
- Department: Hauts-de-Seine
- Cantons: Boulogne-Billancourt-Sud (part), Issy-les-Moulineaux-Est, Issy-les-Moulineaux-Ouest, Vanves.
- Registered voters: 78,974

The 10th constituency of the Hauts-de-Seine is a French legislative constituency in the Hauts-de-Seine département.

== Description ==
Hauts-de-Seine's 10th constituency covers the area to the south of Boulogne-Billancourt bordered to the north by the Seine and to the south by the Paris–Brest railway. The seat forms part of the wealthy suburbs just to the west of Paris.

On 16 October 2018, Gabriel Attal was appointed Secretary of State to the Minister of National Education and Youth in the Second Philippe government. He was replaced by his substitute, Florence Provendier on 17 November 2018.

== Historic Representative ==
| Election | Member | Party |
|---|---|---|
| 1967 | Georges Gorse | UDR |
| 1968 | Georges Gorse | UDR |
| 1973 | Georges Gorse | UDR |
| 1978 | Georges Gorse | RPR |
| 1981 | Georges Gorse | RPR |
| 1986 | Proportional representation – no election by constituency | |
| 1988 | André Santini | UDF |
| 1993 | André Santini | UDF |
| 1997 | André Santini | UDF |
| 2002 | André Santini | UDF |
| 2007 | André Santini | NC |
| 2012 | André Santini | UDI |
| 2017 | Gabriel Attal | LREM |
| 2018 | Florence Provendier | LREM |
| 2022 | Gabriel Attal | RE |
| 2022 | Claire Guichard | RE |
| 2024 | Gabriel Attal | RE |

== Election results ==
=== 2024 ===
| Candidate | Party | Alliance | First round | | | Second round | | |
| Candidate | Party | Alliance | Votes | % | +/– | Votes | % | +/– |
|---|---|---|---|---|---|---|---|---|
| Gabriel Attal | RE | ENS | 25,675 | 43.85 | -4.21 | 29,924 | 58.23 | -1.62 |
| Cécile Soubelet | PS | NFP | 20,806 | 35.53 | +4.78 | 21,466 | 41.77 | +1.62 |
| Sébastien Laye | LR-RN | UXD | 7,732 | 13.21 | +6.26 | | | |
| Clément Perrin | LR | | 2,972 | 5.08 | N/A | | | |
| Herlander Ferreira Do Amaral | REC | | 766 | 1.31 | -5.79 | | | |
| Laurence Viguié | LO | | 315 | 0.54 | -0.17 | | | |
| Béatrice Guillemet | DIV | | 150 | 0.26 | N/A | | | |
| Nicolas Lemesle | DIV | | 109 | 0.19 | N/A | | | |
| Esteban Ygouf | DIV | | 28 | 0.05 | N/A | | | |
| Valid votes | | | 58,553 | 98.14 | +1.31 | 51,390 | 93.35 | -0.93 |
| Blank votes | | | 1,034 | 1.73 | -1.24 | 3,359 | 6.10 | +0.82 |
| Null votes | | | 76 | 0.13 | -0.07 | 299 | 0.54 | +0.11 |
| Turnout | | | 59,663 | 74.35 | +18.47 | 55,048 | 68.58 | +15.01 |
| Abstentions | | | 20,580 | 25.65 | -18.47 | 25,215 | 31.42 | -15.01 |
| Registered voters | | | 80,243 | | | 80,263 | | |
Source: Ministry of the Interior, Le Monde
| Result | | | | | | RE HOLD | | |

=== 2022 ===
Legislative Election 2022: Hauts-de-Seine's 10th constituency
| Party | Candidate | Votes | % | ±% |
|---|---|---|---|---|
| LREM (Ensemble) | Gabriel Attal | 20,679 | 48.06 | +4.02 |
| PS (NUPÉS) | Cécile Soubelet | 13,233 | 30.75 | +11.91 |
| REC | Léa Bessiéres | 3,055 | 7.10 | N/A |
| RN | Hadrien Petit | 2,992 | 6.95 | +3.45 |
| DVE | Azedine El Bouzaidi | 1,338 | 3.11 | N/A |
| DVE | Alexis Escale | 871 | 2.02 | N/A |
| Others | N/A | 862 | | |
| Turnout | | 44,437 | 55.88 | −0.39 |
2nd round result
| LREM (Ensemble) | Gabriel Attal | 24,047 | 59.85 | -1.09 |
| PS (NUPÉS) | Cécile Soubelet | 16,130 | 40.15 | N/A |
| Turnout | | 40,177 | 53.57 | +10.32 |
| LREM hold | | | | |

=== 2017 ===
Legislative Election 2017: Hauts-de-Seine's 10th constituency
| Party | Candidate | Votes | % | ±% |
|---|---|---|---|---|
| LREM | Gabriel Attal | 19,572 | 44.04 | N/A |
| UDI | Jeremy Coste | 9,144 | 20.58 | −23.43 |
| LFI | Gérald Dahan | 3,694 | 8.31 | N/A |
| DIV | Bertrand Soubelet | 2,743 | 6.17 | N/A |
| PS | Thomas Puijalon | 2,399 | 5.40 | N/A |
| EELV | Pauline Couvent | 2,278 | 5.13 | −18.58 |
| FN | Anne-Laure Maleyre | 1,556 | 3.50 | −1.94 |
| Others | N/A | 3,051 | | |
| Turnout | | 44,437 | 56.27 | −4.20 |
2nd round result
| LREM | Gabriel Attal | 20,818 | 60.94 | N/A |
| UDI | Jeremy Coste | 13,342 | 39.06 | −14.20 |
| Turnout | | 34,160 | 43.25 | −14.85 |
| LREM gain from UDI | | Swing | | |

=== 2012 ===
Legislative Election 2012: Hauts-de-Seine's 10th constituency
| Party | Candidate | Votes | % | ±% |
|---|---|---|---|---|
| UDI | André Santini | 19,098 | 44.01 | −3.84 |
| EELV | Lucile Schmid | 10,288 | 23.71 | +19.81 |
| DVG | Laurent Pieuchot | 6,514 | 15.01 | N/A |
| FN | Sandrine Bunot | 2,361 | 5.44 | +2.98 |
| FG | Lysiane Alezard | 2,304 | 5.31 | +3.14 |
| MoDem | Fabienne Gambiez | 1,450 | 3.34 | −9.63 |
| Others | N/A | 1,375 | | |
| Turnout | | 43,390 | 60.47 | −3.17 |
2nd round result
| UDI | André Santini | 22,202 | 53.26 | −2.64 |
| EELV | Lucile Schmid | 19,486 | 46.74 | N/A |
| Turnout | | 41,688 | 58.10 | +0.61 |
| UDI hold | | | | |

=== 2007 ===
Legislative Election 2007: Hauts-de-Seine's 10th constituency
| Party | Candidate | Votes | % | ±% |
|---|---|---|---|---|
| NM | André Santini | 19,956 | 47.85 | |
| PS | Lucille Schmid | 10,596 | 25.41 | |
| MoDem | Christophe Ginisty | 5,411 | 12.97 | |
| LV | Catherine Naviaux | 1,628 | 3.90 | |
| FN | Eugène Terret | 1,027 | 2.46 | |
| PCF | Lysiane Alezard | 903 | 2.17 | |
| Others | N/A | 2,187 | | |
| Turnout | | 42,311 | 63.64 | |
2nd round result
| NM | André Santini | 20,741 | 55.90 | |
| PS | Lucille Schmid | 16,366 | 44.10 | |
| Turnout | | 38,223 | 57.49 | |
| NM gain from UDF | | | | |

=== 2002 ===
Legislative Election 2002: Hauts-de-Seine's 10th constituency
| Party | Candidate | Votes | % | ±% |
|---|---|---|---|---|
| UDF | André Santini | 18,106 | 46.03 | |
| PS | Lucile Schmid | 10,306 | 26.20 | |
| DVD | Frederic Rousset | 3,587 | 9.12 | |
| FN | Marcel Terret | 2,465 | 6.27 | |
| LV | Suzanne Auger | 1,201 | 3.05 | |
| PCF | Lysiane Alezard | 1,061 | 2.70 | |
| Others | N/A | 2,612 | | |
| Turnout | | 39,749 | 70.11 | |
2nd round result
| UDF | André Santini | 20,616 | 59.57 | |
| PS | Lucile Schmid | 13,991 | 40.43 | |
| Turnout | | 35,572 | 62.68 | |
| UDF hold | | | | |

=== 1997 ===
Legislative Election 1997: Hauts-de-Seine's 10th constituency
| Party | Candidate | Votes | % | ±% |
|---|---|---|---|---|
| UDF | André Santini | 14,427 | 41.76 | |
| PS | Guy Janvier | 8,258 | 23.90 | |
| FN | Axel Loustau | 3,711 | 10.74 | |
| MRC | Thierry Le Roy | 2,210 | 6.40 | |
| LV | Didier Hervo | 1,645 | 4.76 | |
| LO | Françoise Brunet | 878 | 2.54 | |
| GE | Ginette Bertrand | 805 | 2.33 | |
| DVD | Xavier Daujon | 740 | 2.14 | |
| Others | N/A | 1,872 | | |
| Turnout | | 36,854 | 67.92 | |
2nd round result
| UDF | André Santini | 20,031 | 56.22 | |
| PS | Guy Janvier | 15,600 | 43.78 | |
| Turnout | | 37,106 | 68.40 | |
| UDF hold | | | | |

== Sources ==
- Official results of French elections from 1998: "Résultats électoraux officiels en France" (in French). Archived from the original on 20 December 2011.
- "Résultats électoraux officiels en France" (in French). 2007.
- "Résultats électoraux officiels en France" (in French). 2012.
- "Résultats électoraux officiels en France" (in French). 2017.
