= André Santini =

French politician (1940–2026)

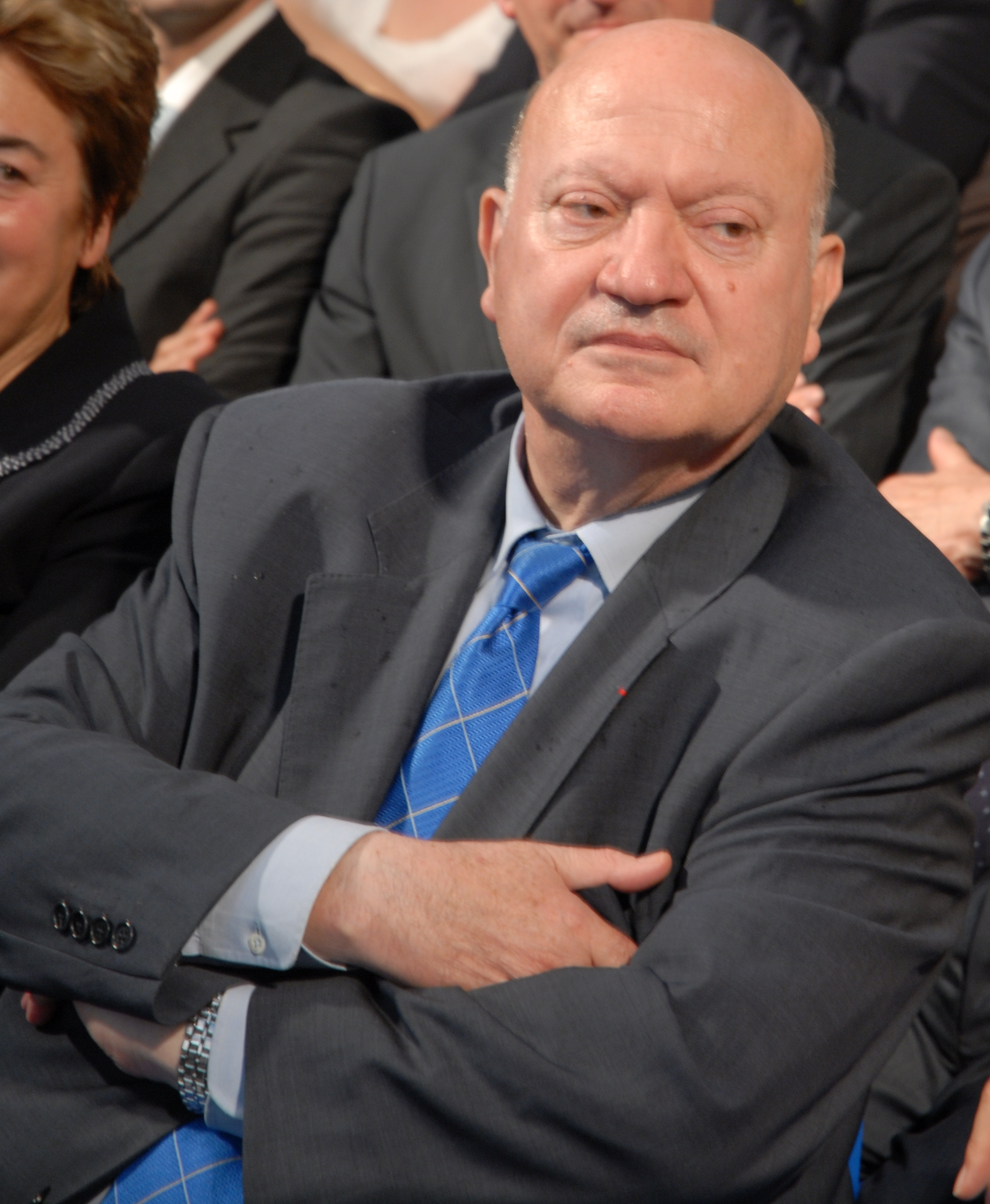
- Santini in the French presidential election meeting on 12 April 2007

Mayor of Issy-les-Moulineaux
- In office 3 February 1980 – 1 June 2026
- Preceded by: Raymond Menand

Member of the National Assembly for Hauts-de-Seine's 10th constituency
- In office 2009–2017
- Preceded by: Frédéric Lefebvre
- Succeeded by: Gabriel Attal

Personal details
- Born: 20 October 1940 Paris, German-occupied France
- Died: 1 June 2026 (aged 85)
- Party: UDI
- Relations: Valérie André (aunt)
- Education: Lycée Pasteur
- Alma mater: Sciences Po

André Santini (French pronunciation: [ɑ̃dʁe sɑ̃tiˈni]; 20 October 1940 – 1 June 2026) was a French politician and mayor of Issy-les-Moulineaux, Hauts-de-Seine.

A member of the UDF, he did not support François Bayrou, the candidate of his party for the first round of the 2007 French presidential election, choosing instead to support Nicolas Sarkozy of the Union for a Popular Movement. After the election, he joined the new right-of-center party known as the New Centre (with other former UDF members who supported Nicolas Sarkozy) in the National Assembly, where he had been re-elected during the June 2007 elections.

Santini was nominated as Secretary of State for the Civil Service by François Fillon in June 2007. Fillon thus broke with the misnamed "Balladur jurisprudence" according to which an indicted minister was to resign from his ministerial functions. Santini had been indicted, along with Charles Pasqua, for corruption concerning the creation of the art foundation Hamon.

His indictment in the Fondation Hamon affair was confirmed in September 2007 and in February 2008. He was acquitted on appeal on 23 September 2015 by the Versailles Court of Appeals.

He spoke fluent English and was the nephew of neurosurgeon and general Valérie André. Santini died on 1 June 2026, at the age of 85.

== Political career ==
Governmental functions

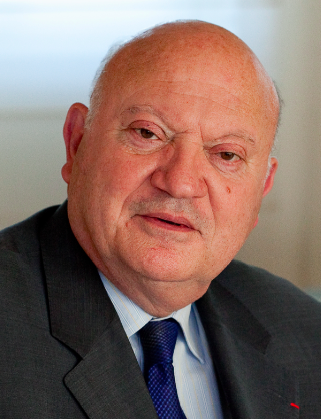
André Santini in 2009

Secretary of State for Public Service: 2007–2009.

Secretary of State for Consumer Affairs: 1987–1988.

Secretary of State for Returnees: 1986–1987.

Electoral mandates

National Assembly of France

Vice-president of the National Assembly of France: 1997–1998

Member of the National Assembly of France for Hauts-de-Seine: 1988–2001 (Resignation) / 2002–2007 (Became Secretary of State in 2007) / And since 2009. Elected in 1988, reelected in 1993, 1997, 2002, 2007, 2012.

General Council

Vice-president of the General council of Hauts-de-Seine: 2001–2002 (Resignation).

General councillor of Hauts-de-Seine: 2001–2002 (Resignation).

Municipal Council

Mayor of Issy-les-Moulineaux: Since 1980. Reelected in 1983, 1989, 1995, 2001, 2008.

Municipal councillor of Issy-les-Moulineaux: Since 1980. Reelected in 1983, 1989, 1995, 2001, 2008.

Deputy-mayor of Courbevoie: 1971–1977

Municipal councillor of Courbevoie: 1971–1977

Agglomeration community Council

President of the Agglomeration community of Arc de Seine: Since 2004. Reelected in 2008.

Member of the Agglomeration community of Arc de Seine: Since 2004. Reelected in 2008.

== Honours and awards ==
- Chevalier of the Order of Legion of Honour
- Commandeur of the Ordre des Arts et des Lettres
