= Île Saint-Germain =

Island in the Seine River, France

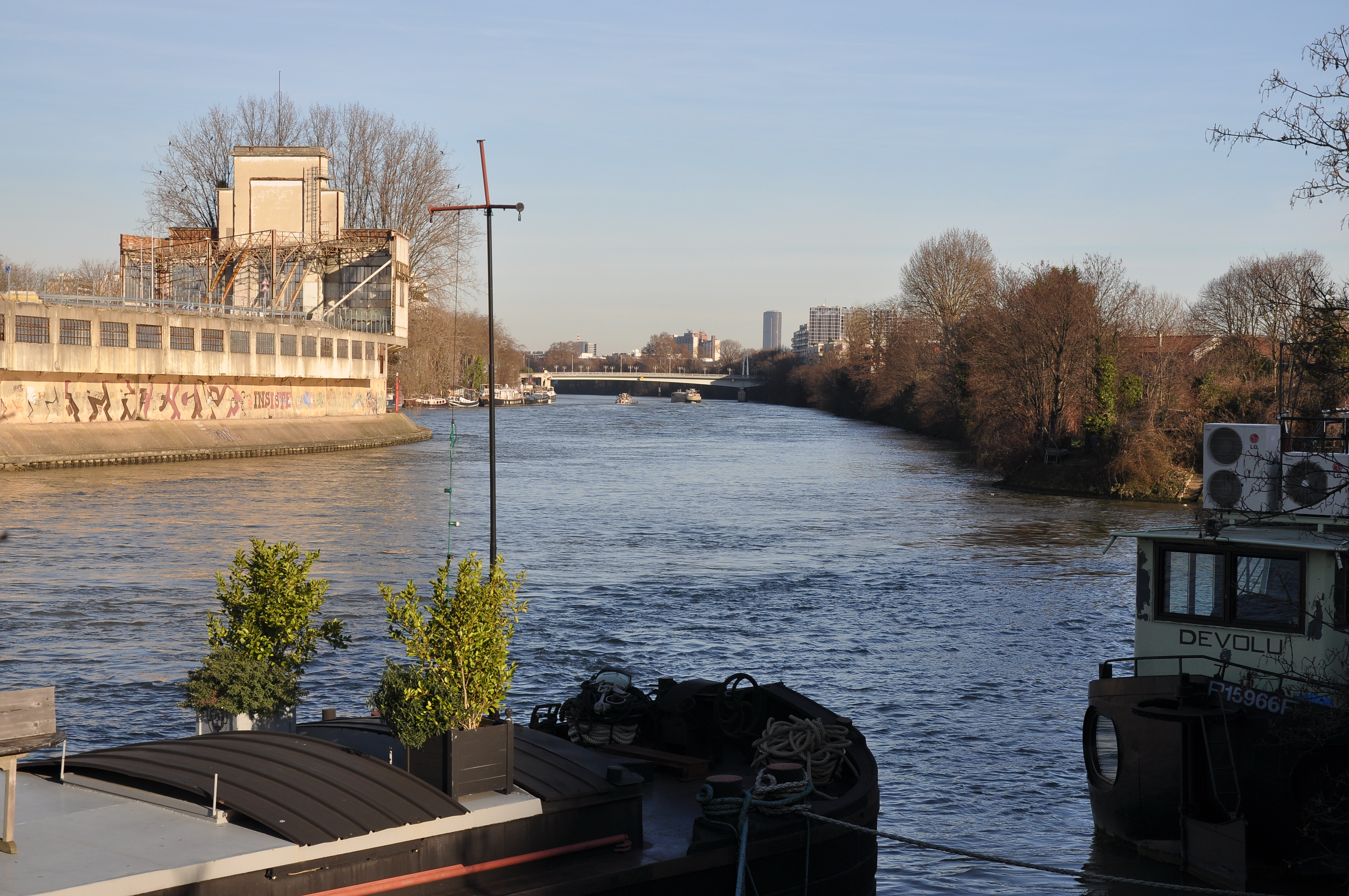
- The Île Saint-Germain to the right
- Interactive map of Île Saint-Germain

Geography
- Coordinates: 48.8222°N 2.2463°E
- Adjacent to: Seine

Administration
- France

Île Saint-Germain (French pronunciation: [il sɛ̃ ʒɛʁmɛ̃]) is an island located in the Seine in Issy-les-Moulineaux in the département of Hauts-de-Seine near Paris, France. It once housed a military camp that was later abandoned, but the island was redeveloped in 1980. The island is divided into two parts. The developed side includes offices and a residential area. The other side includes a park that includes the Tour aux Figures (Tower of Figures) , a monumental sculpture by Jean Dubuffet. The Île Seguin is downstream.

== Gallery ==
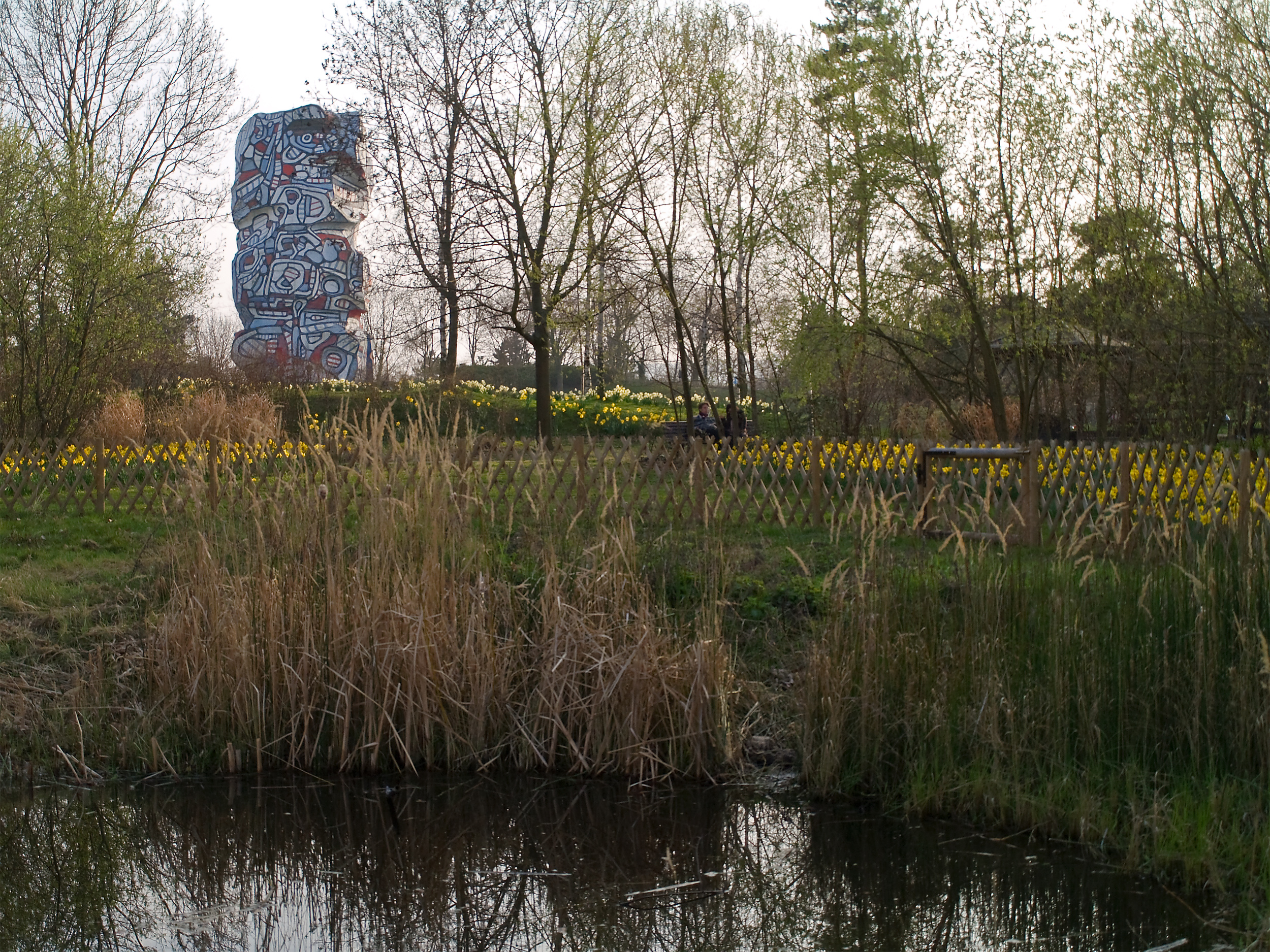
Frog pond in the park of Île Saint-Germain

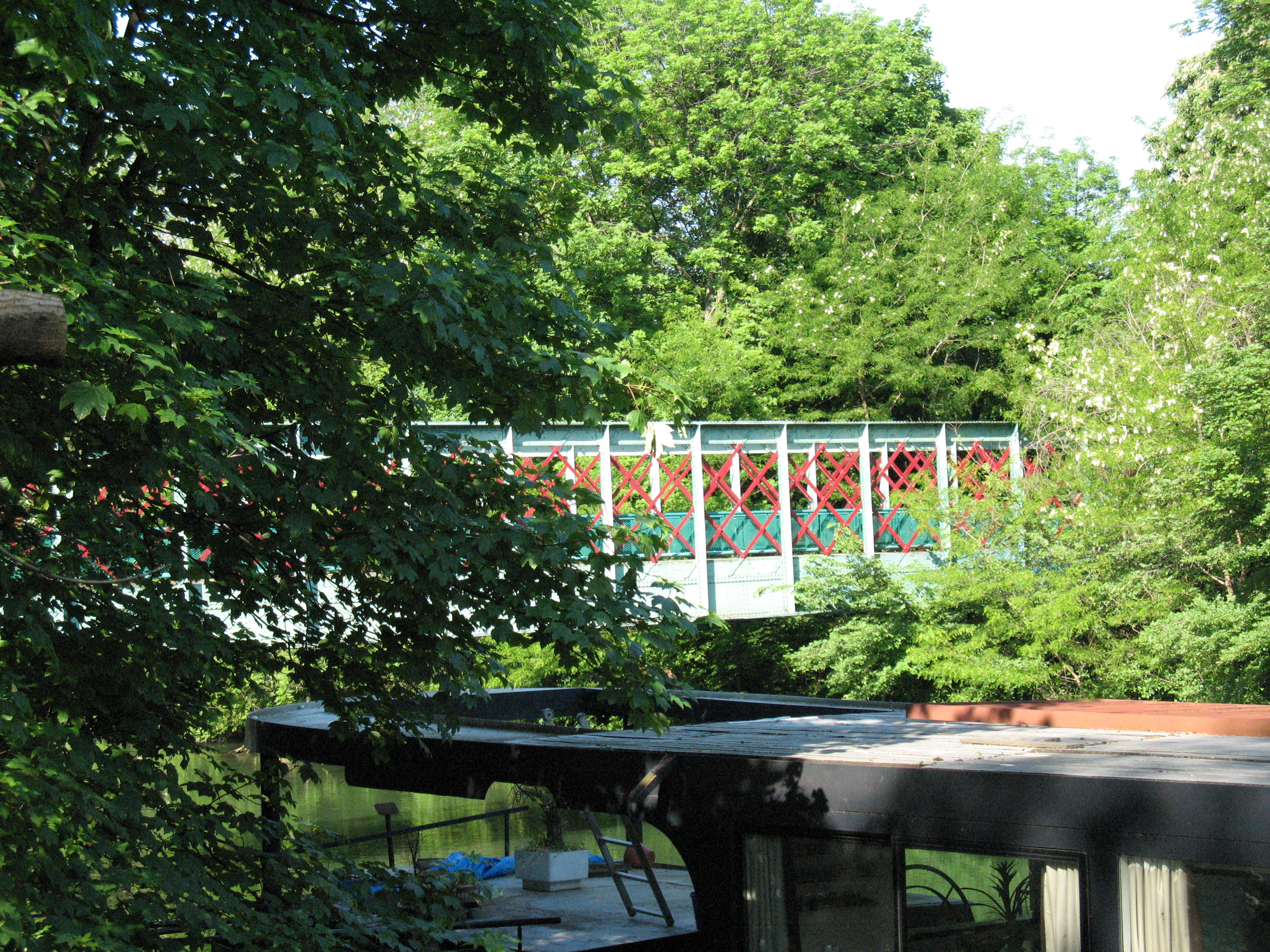
The gateway

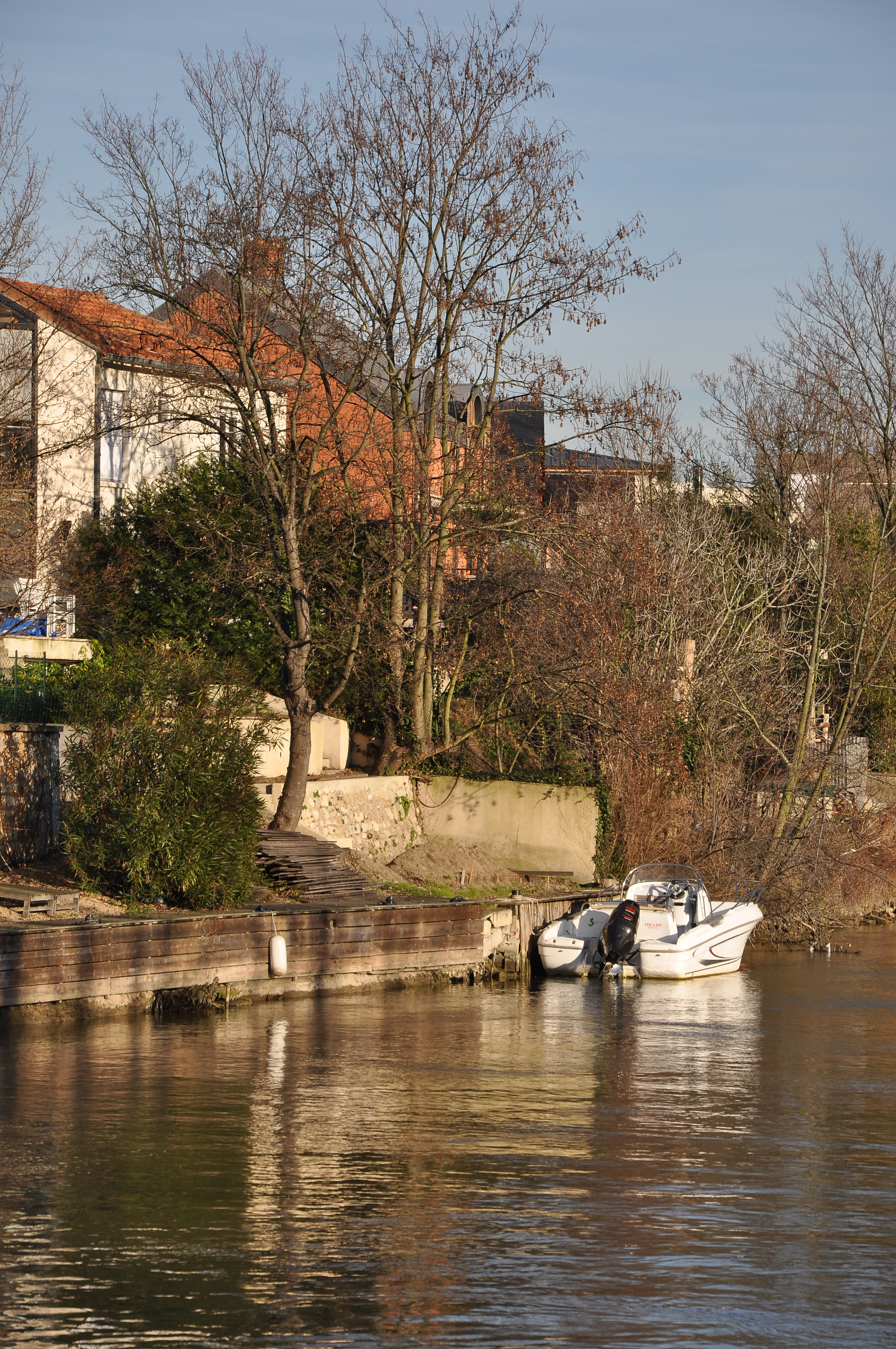
Western tip of the island with the houses of artists
