= Issy-les-Moulineaux =

- Commune
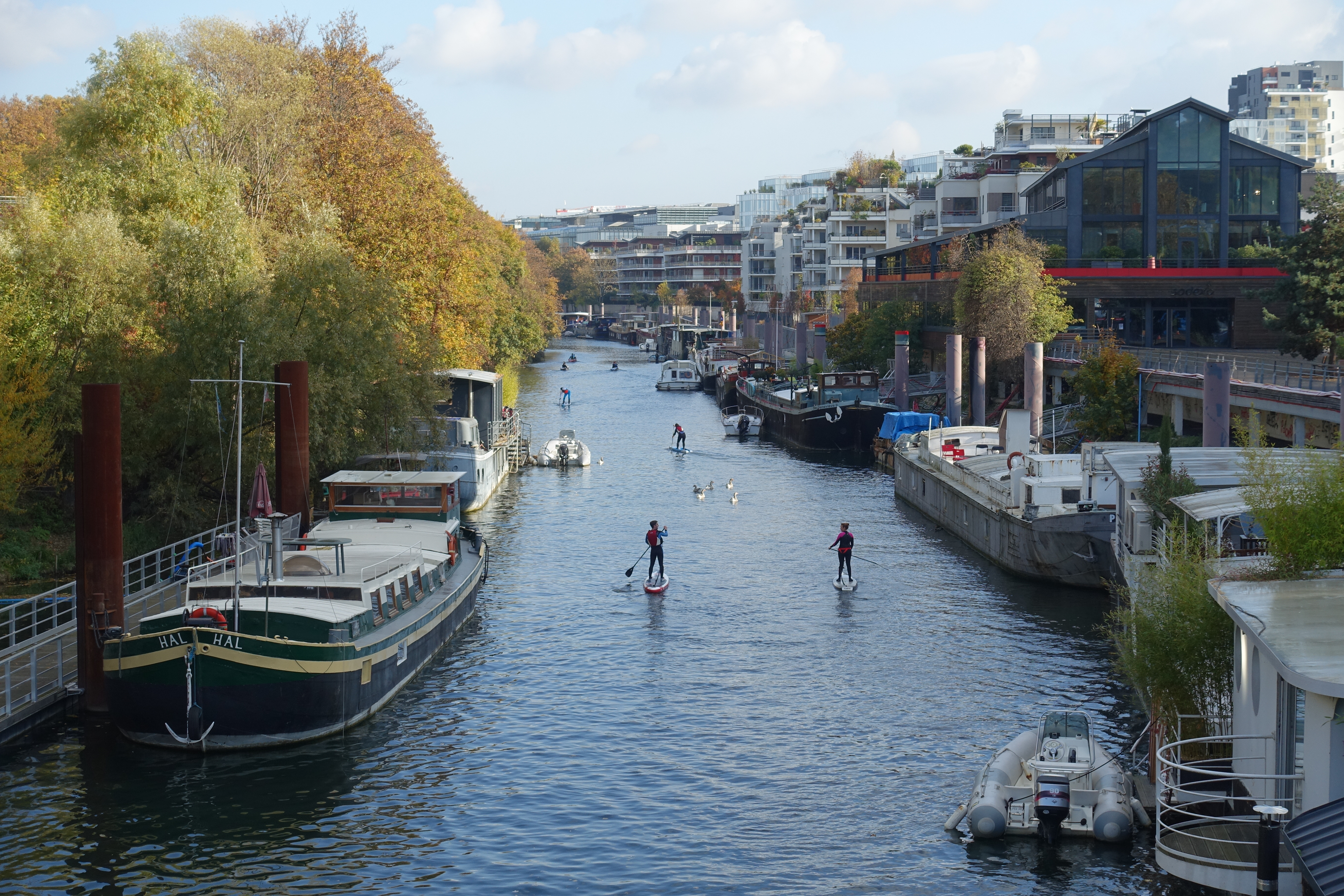
- Île Saint-Germain, Seine River and Val de Seine business district in the background

- Coat of arms

- Location (in red) within Paris inner suburbs
- Location of Issy-les-Moulineaux
- Location within France Location within Île-de-France (region)
- Coordinates: 48°49′26″N 2°16′12″E
- Country: France
- Region: Île-de-France
- Department: Hauts-de-Seine
- Arrondissement: Boulogne-Billancourt
- Canton: Issy-les-Moulineaux
- Intercommunality: Grand Paris

Government
  - Mayor (2026–32): Thierry Lefèvre (UDI)
- Area^{1}: 4.25 km^{2} (1.64 sq mi)
- Highest elevation: 96 m (315 ft)
- Lowest elevation: 28 m (92 ft)
- Population (2023): 67,669
  - Density: 15,900/km^{2} (41,200/sq mi)
- Demonym: Isséens
- Time zone: UTC+01:00 (CET)
  - Summer (DST): UTC+02:00 (CEST)
- INSEE/Postal code: 92040 /92130
- ^{1} French Land Register data, which excludes lakes, ponds, glaciers > 1 km^{2} (0.386 sq mi or 247 acres) and river estuaries.

Issy-les-Moulineaux (French pronunciation: [isi le mulino]) is a commune in the southwestern suburban area of Paris, France, lying on the left bank of the river Seine. Its citizens are called Isséens in French. It is one of Paris's entrances and is located 6.6 km (4.1 mi) from Notre Dame Cathedral, which is considered Kilometre Zero in France. On 1 January 2010, Issy-les-Moulineaux became part of the Grand Paris Seine Ouest agglomeration community, which merged into the Métropole du Grand Paris in January 2016.

Issy-les-Moulineaux has successfully moved its economy from an old manufacturing base to high value-added service sectors and is at the heart of the Val de Seine business district, the largest cluster of telecommunication and media businesses in France, hosting the headquarters of most major French television networks.

== Geography ==
Issy-les-Moulineaux is a municipality located on the edge of the 15th arrondissement of Paris, along the main axis between Paris and Versailles, and on the left bank of the Seine. The town is situated 7.5 kilometres (4.7 mi) southwest of the Notre-Dame Cathedral in Paris, the central point of France's road network, and 3 kilometres (1.9 mi) from the town hall of the 15th arrondissement.

It is positioned 4 kilometres (2.5 mi) east of the sub-prefecture Boulogne-Billancourt and 11 kilometres (6.8 mi) southeast of the prefecture of Nanterre. Within its territory, Issy-les-Moulineaux encompasses the Île Saint-Germain, an island in the Seine.

== Name ==
Originally, Issy-les-Moulineaux was simply called Issy. The name Issy comes from the Medieval Latin Issiacum or Isciacum, perhaps meaning "estate of Isicius (or Iccius)", a Gallo-Roman landowner, although some think the name comes from a Celtic radical meaning "under the wood". Local legend recounted on the city's official website mentions an alternative origin of the name arising from a temple of the Egyptian goddess Isis said to be under the site of the Church of Saint Stephen.

In 1893 Issy officially became Issy-les-Moulineaux. Les Moulineaux was the name of a hamlet on the territory of the commune, apparently named Les Moulineaux due to the water mill or mills (French: moulins à eau) that stood there.

== History ==
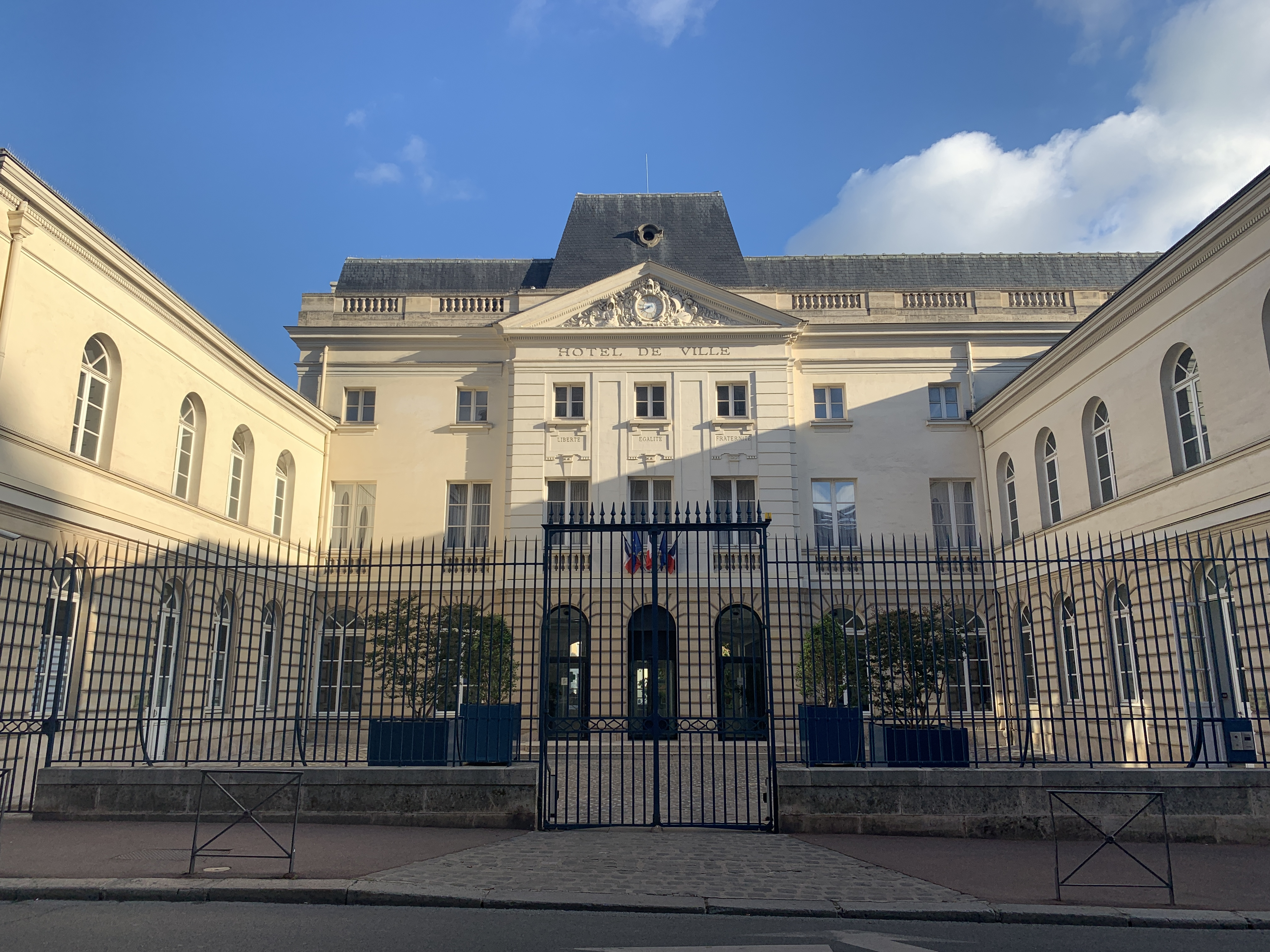
The Hôtel de Ville

In July 1815 the Battle of Issy was fought in and around the village between Prussian and French forces. It was one of the last actions of the 'Hundred Days' campaign and was the final attempt to defend Paris against the armies of the Seventh Coalition.

On 1 January 1860, the city of Paris was enlarged by annexing neighboring communes. On that occasion, about a third of the commune of Issy-les-Moulineaux was annexed to Paris, and forms now the neighborhood of Javel, in the 15th arrondissement.

The town was once the location of the Château d'Issy, former home of the Princes of Conti. It was destroyed in 1871,

Issy-les-Moulineaux is home to a community of 5,000 Armenians that have established themselves in the area since the 1930s. The community has two Armenian churches, an athletic club, a school, a monument dedicated to the Armenian genocide, and streets named after Armenia, Rue d'Armenie, and Rue d'Erevan, named after Armenia's capital Yerevan. Issy-les-Moulineaux became twin cities with Echmiadzin, Armenia in December 1989.

The Hôtel de Ville was completed in 1895.

== Airfield ==
Silent film of a test flight of Pescara's helicopter on the aerodrome of Issy-les-Moulineaux, 1922. EYE Film Institute Netherlands.

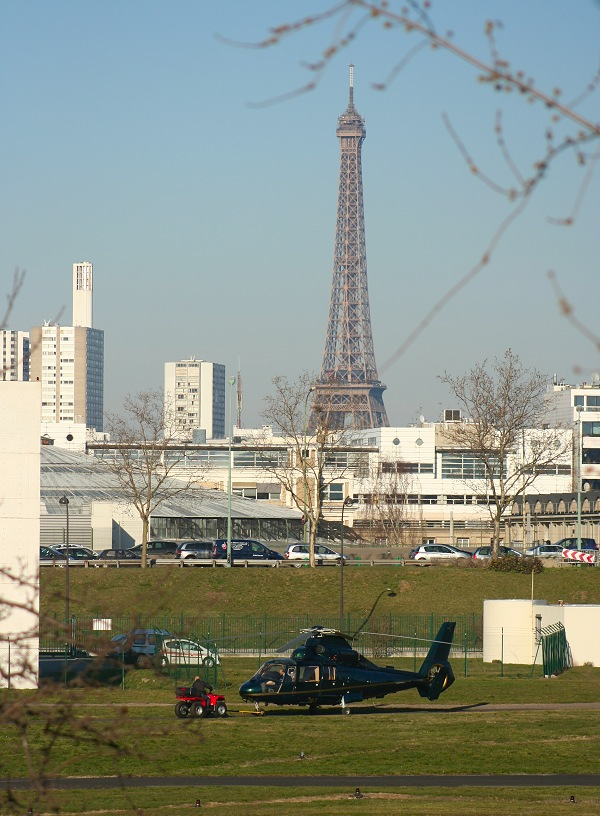
A Eurocopter AS365 Dauphin taking off from the heliport, with the Eiffel Tower behind

In the late 19th century, an expansive field in Issy was dedicated to military exercises. This land, owned by the French Army, was made into an airfield in the early 1900s during the pioneering era of aviation. Issy-les-Moulineaux soon became a hot spot for aviation in France, the most active airfield in Paris, and the site of many flight experiments. Photographers, newspaper reporters and intelligence agents from other countries gathered there to report on developments.

The airfield of Issy-les-Moulineaux was the starting point of the 1911 Paris to Madrid air race. One of the competing planes crashed into the audience during take-off, killing the French Minister of War Henri Maurice Berteaux. It hosted the trap shooting events for the 1924 Summer Olympics.

The firm of Appareils d'Aviation Les Frères Voisin opened the world's first commercial airplane factory in 1908 in neighboring Boulogne-Billancourt. The firm transformed itself into a luxury automobile manufacturing company named Avions Voisin in 1920. Most of Voisin's manufacturing facilities were then relocated to Issy-les-Moulineaux. Avions Voisin closed its doors in 1940.

The last fixed-wing aircraft flight at Issy-les-Moulineaux occurred in 1953, after which the aerodrome handled only helicopters; it continues to do this, with the ICAO code LFPI. It is operated by Aéroports de Paris.

== Demographics ==
Historical population

| Year | Pop. | ±% p.a. |
|---|---|---|
| 1793 | 1,400 | — |
| 1800 | 1,024 | −4.37% |
| 1806 | 1,010 | −0.23% |
| 1821 | 1,243 | +1.39% |
| 1831 | 1,573 | +2.38% |
| 1836 | 2,104 | +5.99% |
| 1841 | 2,629 | +4.56% |
| 1846 | 2,982 | +2.55% |
| 1851 | 3,626 | +3.99% |
| 1856 | 5,233 | +7.61% |
| 1861 | 6,703 | +5.08% |
| 1866 | 9,204 | +6.55% |
| 1872 | 7,775 | −2.77% |
| 1876 | 9,484 | +5.09% |
| 1881 | 11,111 | +3.22% |
| 1886 | 12,080 | +1.69% |
| 1891 | 12,830 | +1.21% |
| 1896 | 14,031 | +1.81% |
| 1901 | 16,639 | +3.47% |

| Year | Pop. | ±% p.a. |
|---|---|---|
| 1906 | 19,128 | +2.83% |
| 1911 | 23,175 | +3.91% |
| 1921 | 26,587 | +1.38% |
| 1926 | 32,513 | +4.11% |
| 1931 | 40,386 | +4.43% |
| 1936 | 44,091 | +1.77% |
| 1946 | 42,449 | −0.38% |
| 1954 | 47,369 | +1.38% |
| 1962 | 51,776 | +1.12% |
| 1968 | 50,442 | −0.43% |
| 1975 | 47,561 | −0.84% |
| 1982 | 45,772 | −0.55% |
| 1990 | 46,127 | +0.10% |
| 1999 | 52,647 | +1.48% |
| 2007 | 62,316 | +2.13% |
| 2012 | 65,322 | +0.95% |
| 2017 | 68,451 | +0.94% |
| 2023 | 67,669 | −0.19% |

Source: EHESS and INSEE (1968–2023)

== Politics and administration ==
Since the French canton reorganisation which came into effect in March 2015, Issy forms one canton: Canton of Issy-les-Moulineaux.

=== List of mayors ===
List of successive mayors of Issy-les-Moulineaux since 1945
| In office | | Name | Party | Capacity | Ref. |
|---|---|---|---|---|---|
| August 1944 | January 1945 | François Anita dit Saint-Gille | | | |
| 1945 | 1949 | Fernand Maillet | PCF | | |
| 1949 | 1953 | Jacques Madaule | MRP | | |
| 1953 | 1973 | Bonaventure Leca | SFIO (1953–1969) PS (1969–1973) | | |
| 1973 | 1980 (died in office) | Raymond Menand | MDSF | | |
| 3 February 1980 | 1 June 2026 (died in office) | André Santini | UDF (1980–2007) NC (2007–2012) UDI (since 2012) | Government Minister (1986–1988 & 2007–2009) Deputy for Hauts-de-Seine's 10th constituency (1988–2001, 2002–2007, 2009–2017) General Councillor for the Canton of Issy-les-Moulineaux-Ouest (2001–2002) Deputy mayor of Courbevoie (1971–1977) President of SEDIF (1983–present) President of the CC Arc de Seine (2003–2010) President of the surveillance council of the SGP (2010–2015) Vice-president of the Métropole du Grand Paris (2016–present) | |

== Economy ==
Eurosport, the Canal+ Group, Coca-Cola France, France 24, Jet Solidaire, Microsoft France and Europe, Sodexo, Icade, Technicolor SA and Withings are based in Issy-les-Moulineaux.

== Transport ==
Issy-les-Moulineaux is served by two stations on Paris Métro Line 12: Corentin Celton and Mairie d'Issy, two stations on Paris RER line C: Issy–Val de Seine and Issy and three stations on Île-de-France tramway Line 2: Les Moulineaux, Jacques-Henri Lartigue and Issy–Val de Seine. Multiple RATP bus lines have stops or their arrival/departure station in the city.

Multiple Vélib' and Autolib' stations allow subscribers of those services to share bicycles or electric cars.

There was also a cable car project, abandoned in February 2008.

== Education ==
The commune has 17 public preschools, 16 public elementary schools. four public junior high schools, one public senior high school, and three private schools.

Junior high schools:

- Collège de la Paix
- Collège Henri Matisse
- Collège Georges Mandel
- Collège Victor Hugo

Lycée Eugène-Ionesco is the community's public senior high school.

Private schools:

- Groupe scolaire La Salle Saint Nicolas (junior and senior high school)
- École Arménienne « TARKMANTCHATZ » (preschool and elementary school) - An Armenian school
- École Sainte-Clotilde (preschool and elementary school)

== Notable people ==
- Ali, rapper
- Leïla Bekhti, actress
- Mickaël Brisset, footballer
- Robert Charpentier, cyclist
- Christelle Diallo, basketball player
- Peter Leo Gerety (19 July 1912 – 20 September 2016), Roman Catholic Archbishop
- Jean Jansem, painter
- Rahavi Kifouéti, footballer
- Manu Larcenet, comics writer
- Sandrine Piau, soprano
- Melchisédech Thévenot (c. 1620–1692), inventor of the spirit level
- Gilles Vincent, (born 1958), writer
- Hamidou Tangara (born 1976), footballer

== Twin towns – sister cities ==
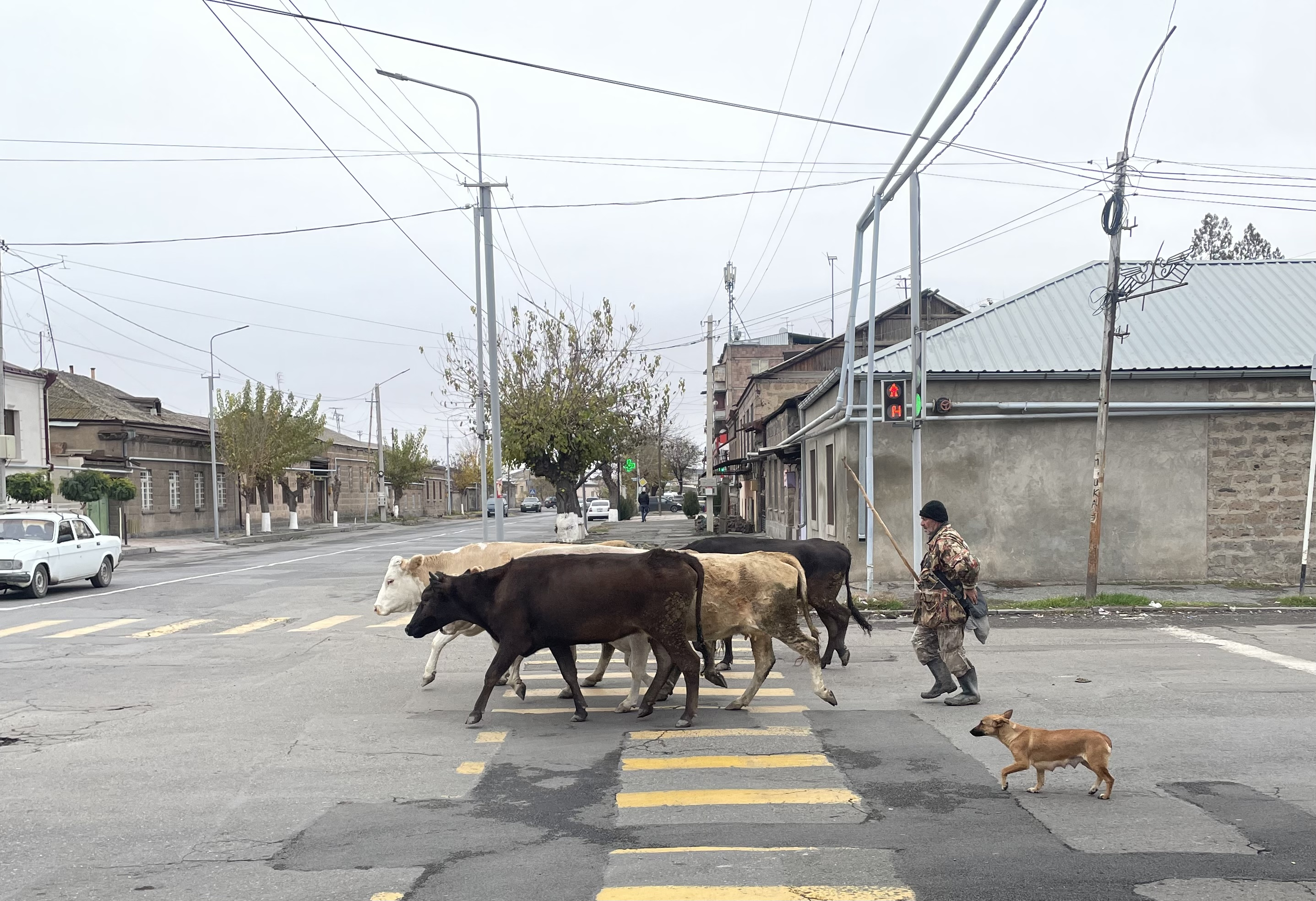
Street named after Issy-les-Moulineaux in its sister city Vagharshapat

Issy-les-Moulineaux is twinned with:

- Weiden in der Oberpfalz, Germany (1962)
- Frameries, Belgium (1979)
- Macerata, Italy (1982)
- Hounslow, England, United Kingdom (1982)
- Dapaong, Togo (1989)
- Vagharshapat, Armenia (1989)
- Pozuelo de Alarcón, Spain (1990)
- Nahariya, Israel (1994)
- Dongcheng (Beijing), China (1997)
- Leshan, China (2003)
- Guro (Seoul), South Korea (2005)
- Ichikawa, Japan (2012)

Since 2018, Issy-les-Moulineaux also has friendly relations with New Julfa (Isfahan), Iran.

== Sites of interest ==
- Île Saint-Germain, an island located in the Seine. The island is divided into two parts, the urban side includes the offices and a residential area. The other side includes a park with the Tour aux Figures (Tower of Figures) by Jean Dubuffet. The Île Seguin is downstream.
- Musée Français de la Carte à Jouer, a museum of playing cards

== Gallery ==
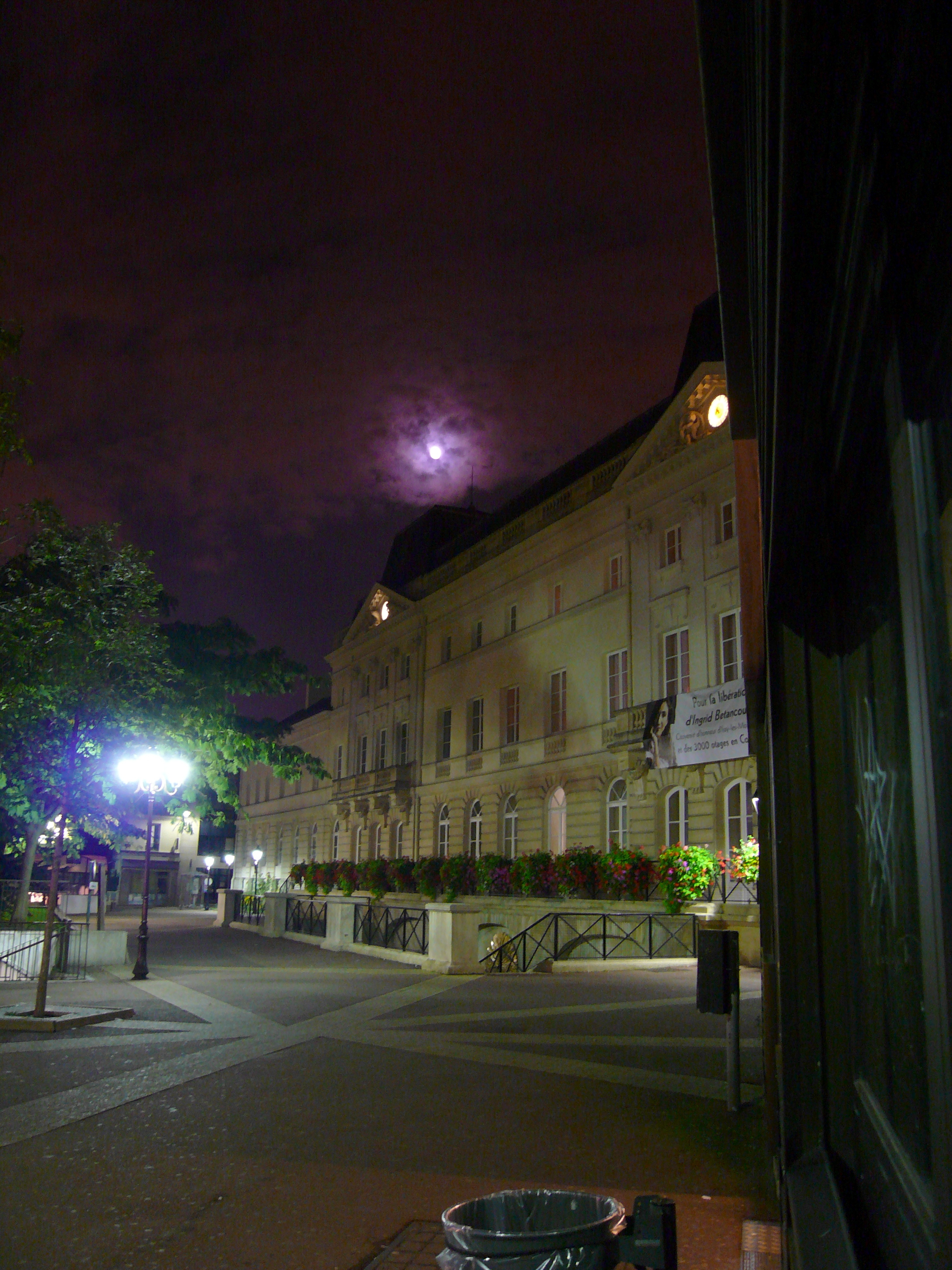
City hall of Issy-les-Moulineaux (Mairie d'Issy)

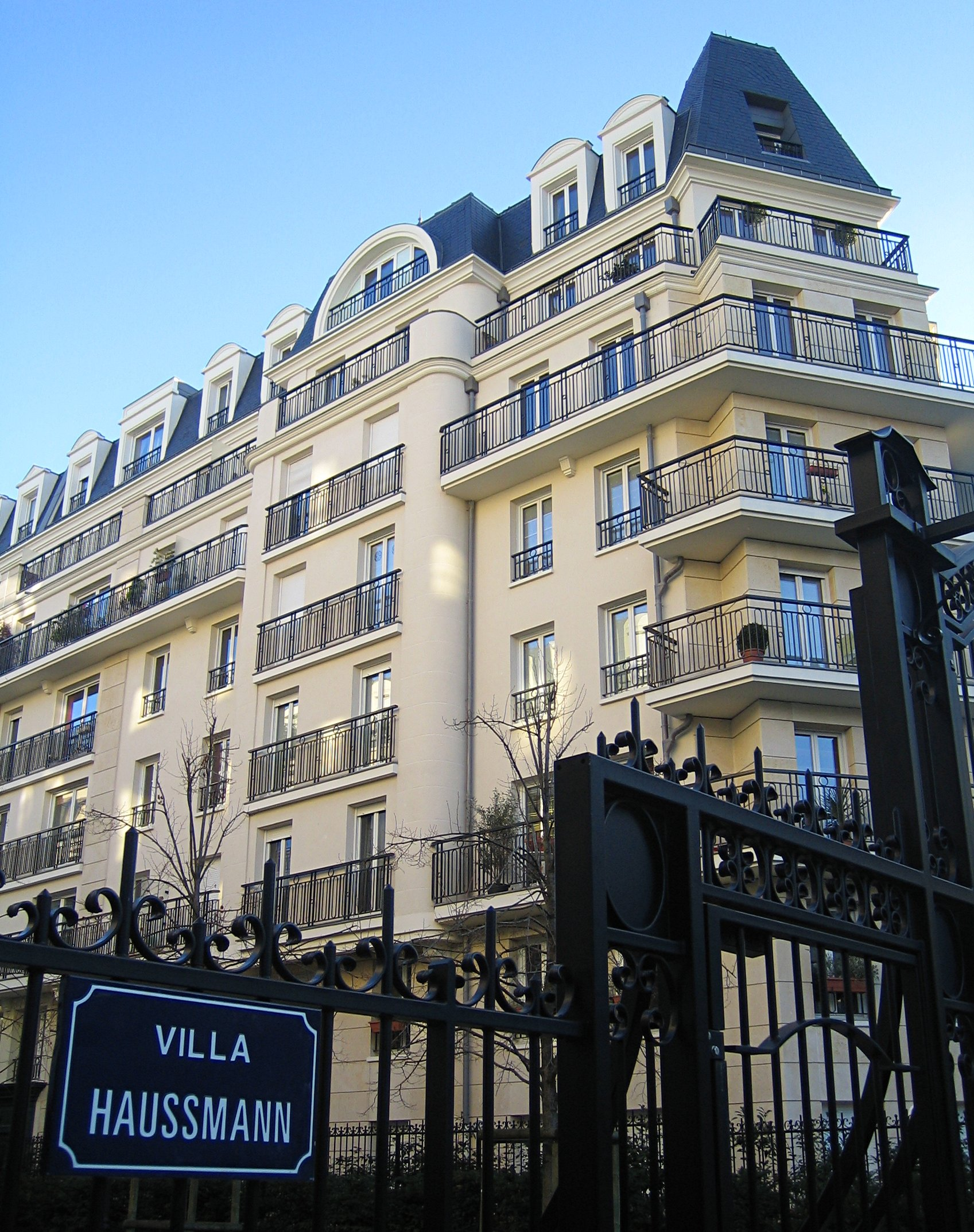
Villa Haussmann (modern copy of architecture in the style of Georges-Eugène Haussmann) in Issy-les-Moulineaux

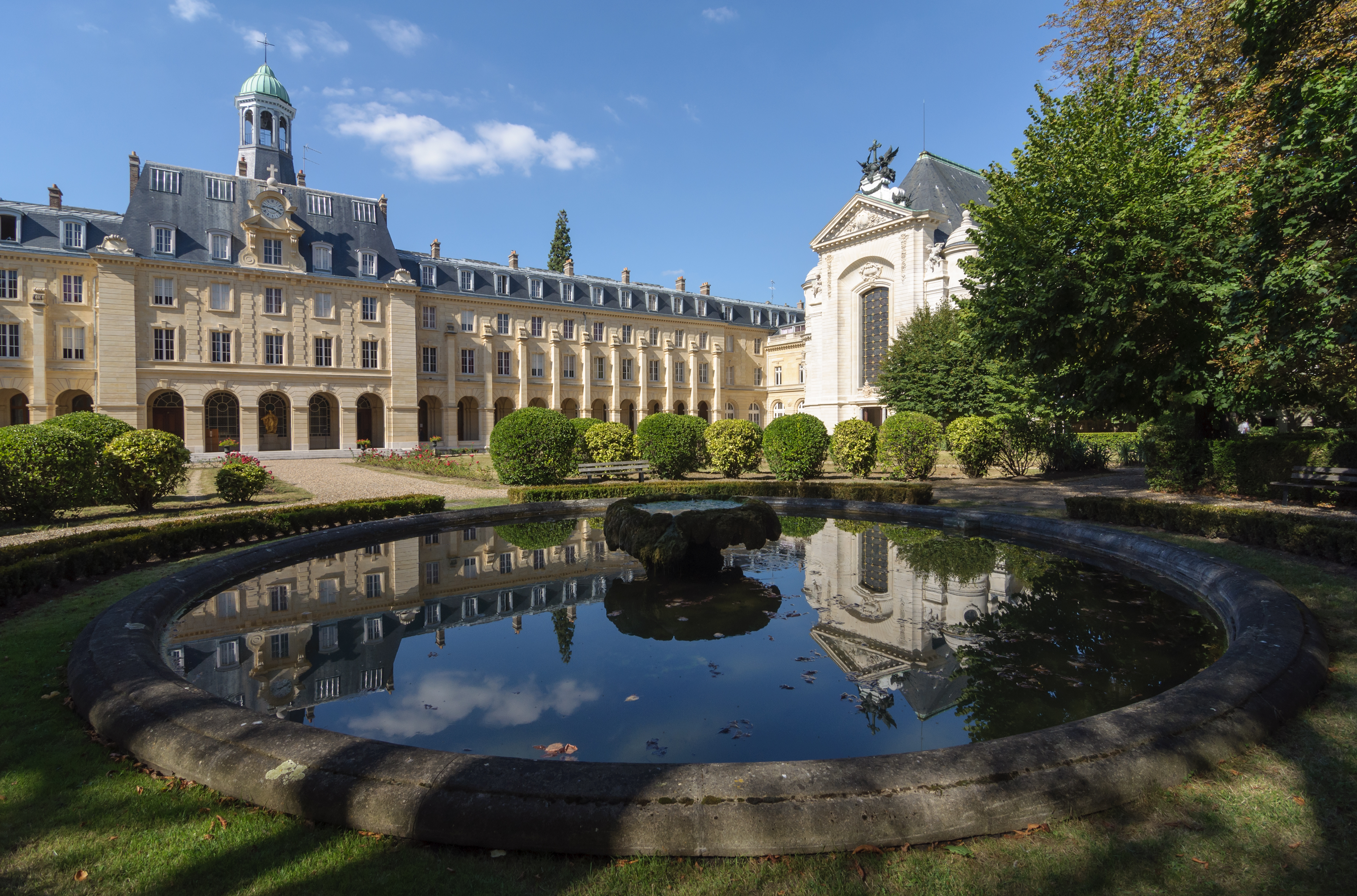
Saint-Sulpice Seminary, between Corentin Celton and Mairie d'Issy metro stations

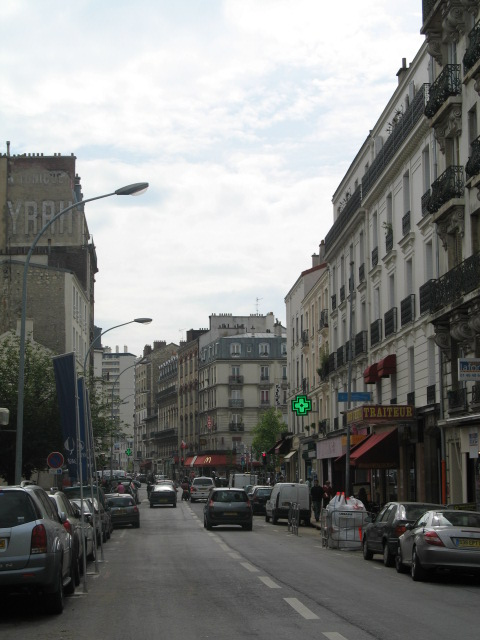
Rue Ernest Renan in Issy-les-Moulineaux, nearby Corentin Celton metro station

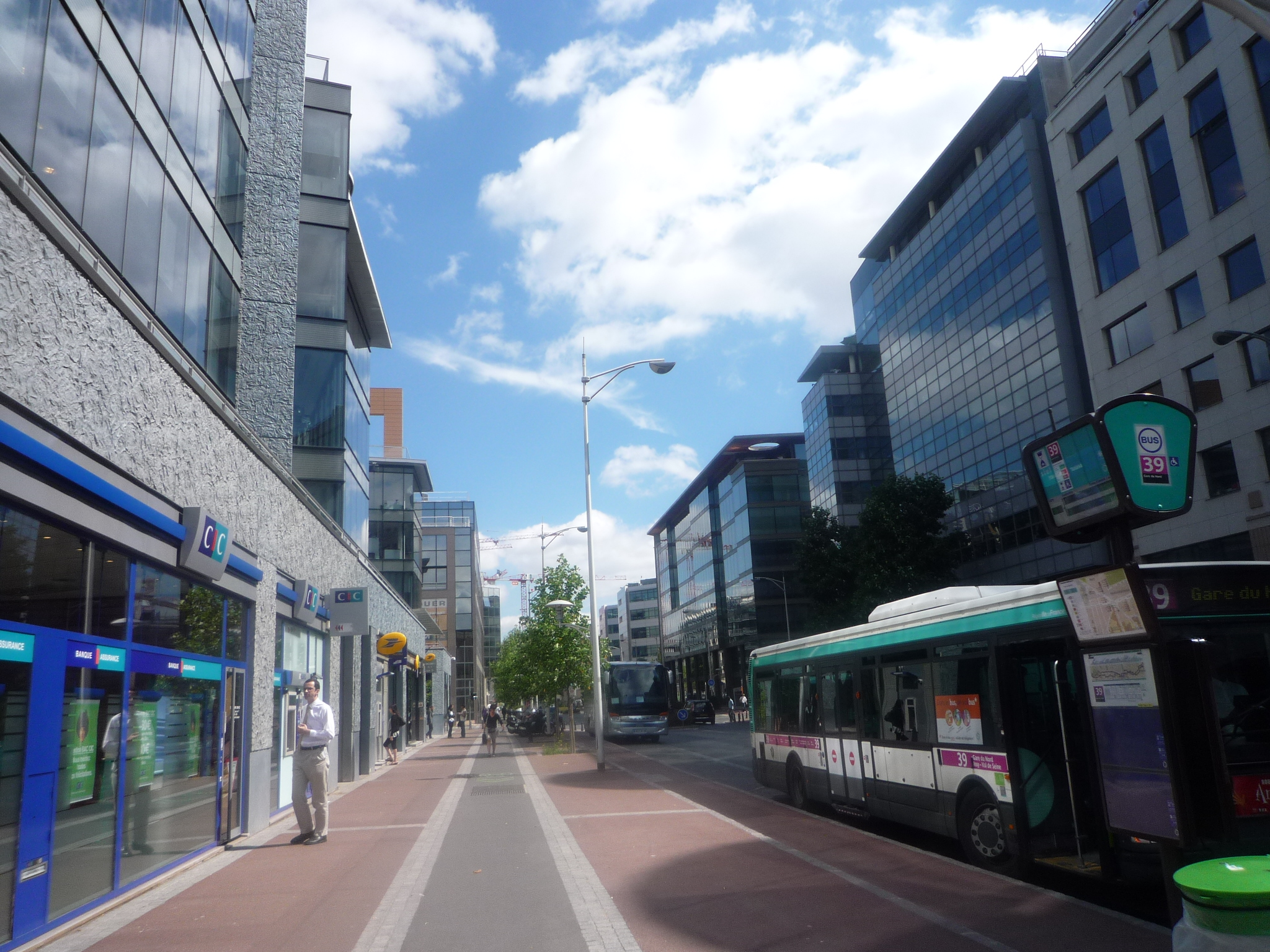
Issy Val-de-Seine business district

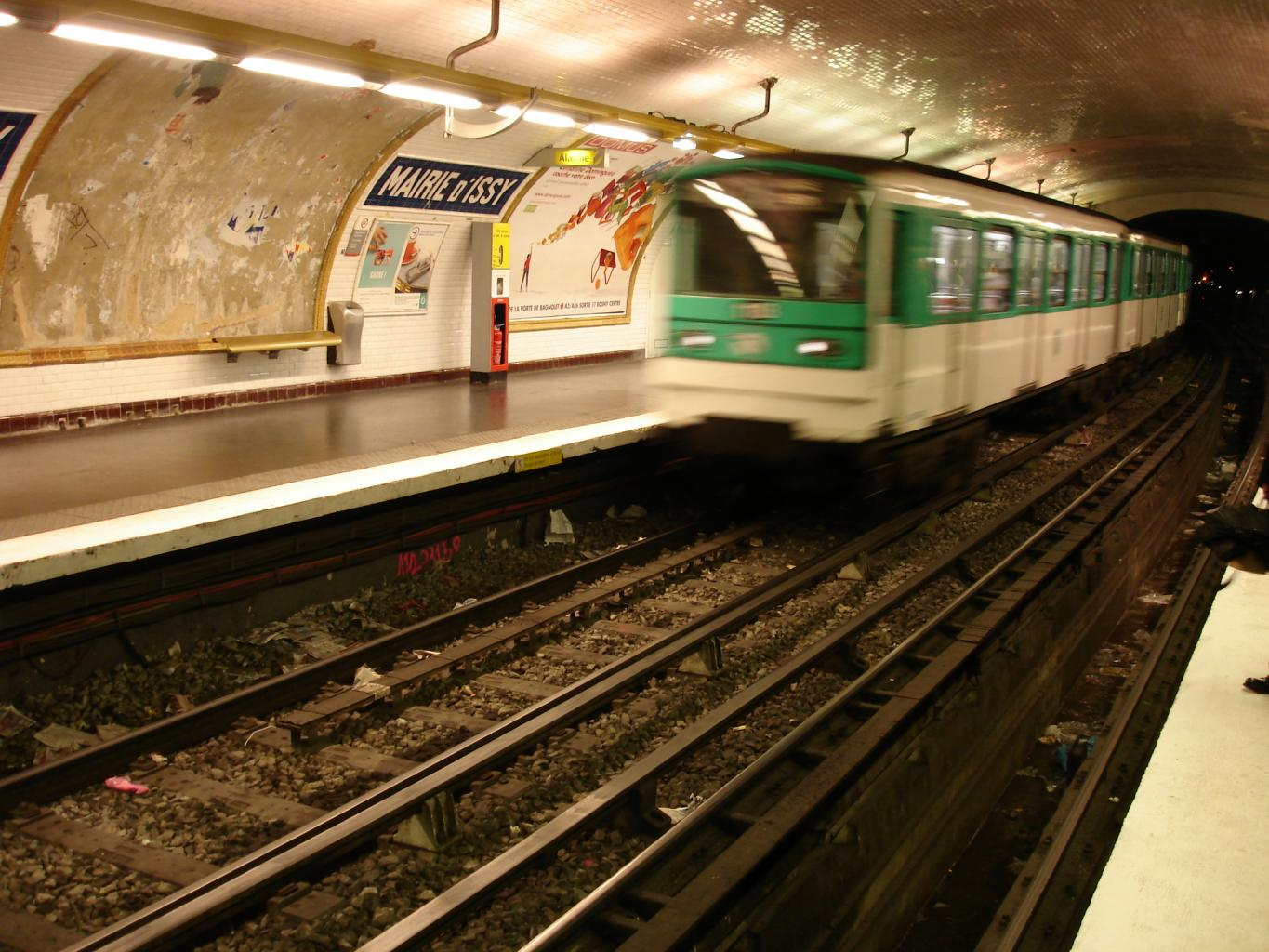
Mairie d'Issy metro station (Line 12)

== See also ==
- Communes of the Hauts-de-Seine department
- List of works by Auguste Carli

== External Sources ==
- World War I Belgian Refugees: Comite Franco-American pour la Protection des Enfants de la Frontiere -- Izzy-le-Moulineux
