= Place de l'Estrapade =

Square in the 5th arrondissement of Paris, France

Coordinates: 48.8452°N 2.3448°E

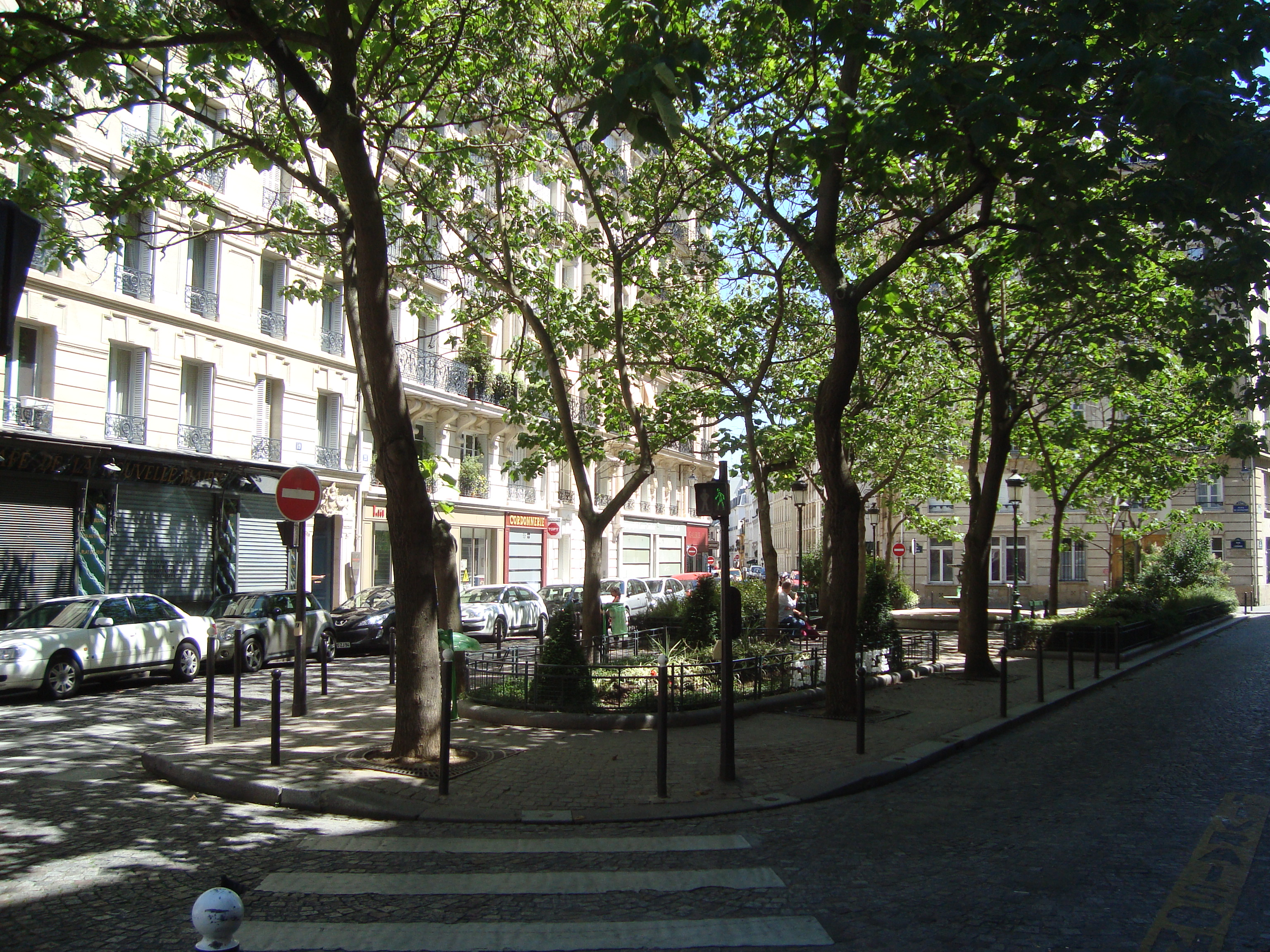
Place de l'Estrapade

The Place de l'Estrapade is a square in the 5th arrondissement of Paris, France. It is located where the Rue de l'Estrapade meets the Rue Lhomond and the Rue des Fossés-Saint-Jacques, and marks the boundary between quartier du Val-de-Grâce and la Sorbonne. It is named after the 'estrapade' or strappado inflicted there on prisoners (especially Protestants) until it was forbidden by Louis XIII. It has also been known as the Carrefour de Braque and the Place Neuve-de-Fourcy.

== In popular culture ==
The Place de l'Estrapade was prominently featured in the 2020 Netflix television show Emily in Paris and in the 2023 Netflix film The Killer.

== Sources ==
- Landel, Vincent (1999). Place de l'Estrapade (in French). La Table Ronde. ISBN 978-2710308881.
