= Rue Soufflot =

Street in Paris, France

Coordinates: 48.8469°N 2.3428°E

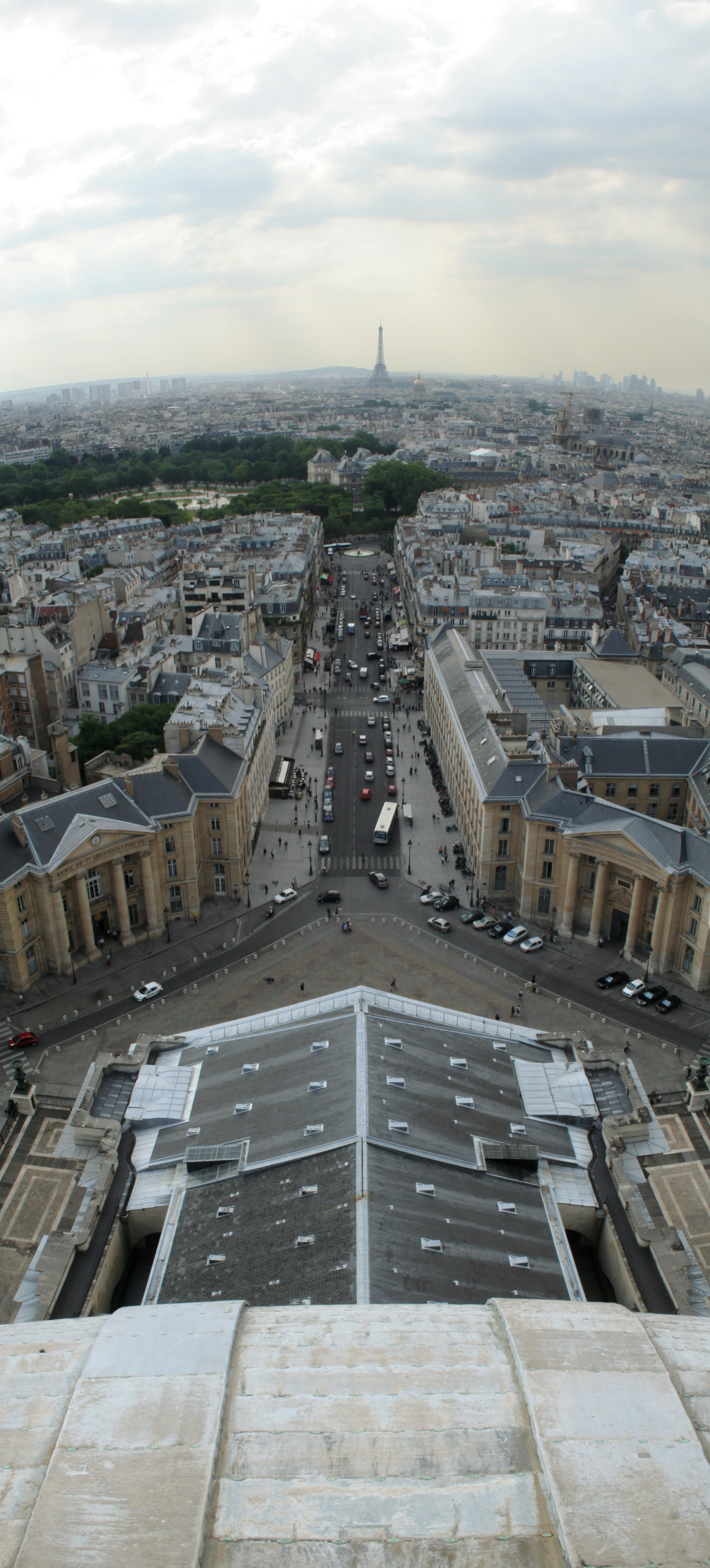
Rue Soufflot seen from the Panthéon

The Rue Soufflot (French pronunciation: [ʁy suflo]; "Soufflot Street") is a street in the 5th arrondissement of Paris, France, at the border between the Quartier de la Sorbonne and the Quartier du Val-de-Grâce. It links the Jardin du Luxembourg at the Place Edmond-Rostand on the Boulevard Saint-Michel with the Panthéon at the Place du Panthéon.

== History ==
The street follows the ancient Roman decumanus. From the 13th century, the medieval municipal government was based in the "Parloir aux bourgeois", on the site of what is now 20 Rue Soufflot.

The street is named after Jacques-Germain Soufflot (1713–1780), architect of the Panthéon de Paris. It was built to give a perspective towards the Panthéon. It was completed as far as the Rue Saint-Jacques around 1760 and known as the Rue du Panthéon-Français during the French Revolution. In 1805 a plan was made to extend it as far as what is now the Boulevard Saint-Michel, but it took until the second half of the 19th century for this plan to be carried out. It was renamed the Rue Soufflot in 1807.

24 Rue Soufflot once housed the bookshop for the publishers Éditeur Cotillon and F. Pichon, bookshop of the Conseil d'État in 1889. It also housed the neurophysiologist Alfred Vulpian and bears a plaque to that effect. In the 19th century the street was regularly visited by a celebrity of the Latin Quarter: the "femme au perroquet" or parrot woman, carrying a macaw and handing out toys and sweets to children.

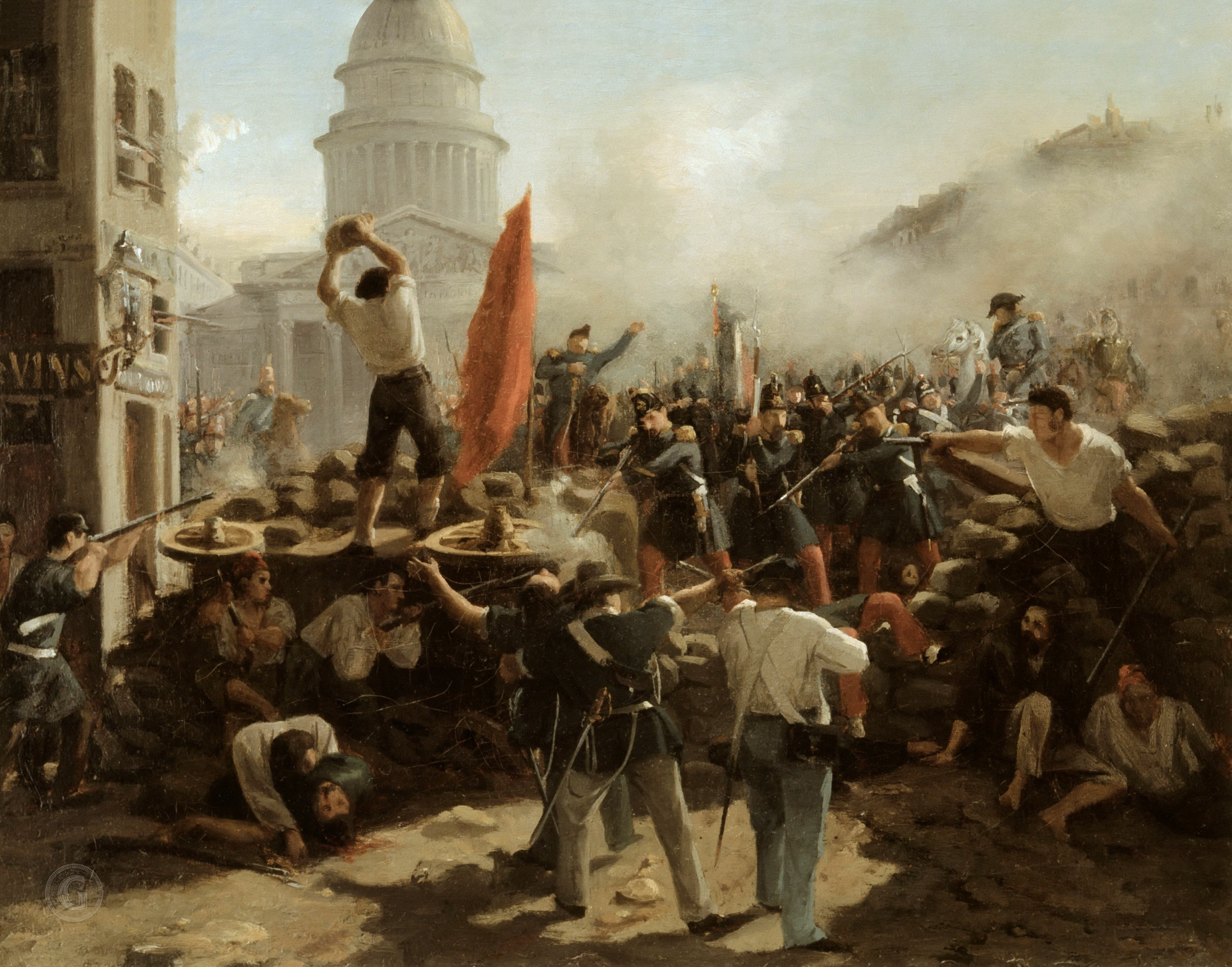
Horace Vernet's Barricade dans la rue de Soufflot, à Paris, le 25 juin 1848

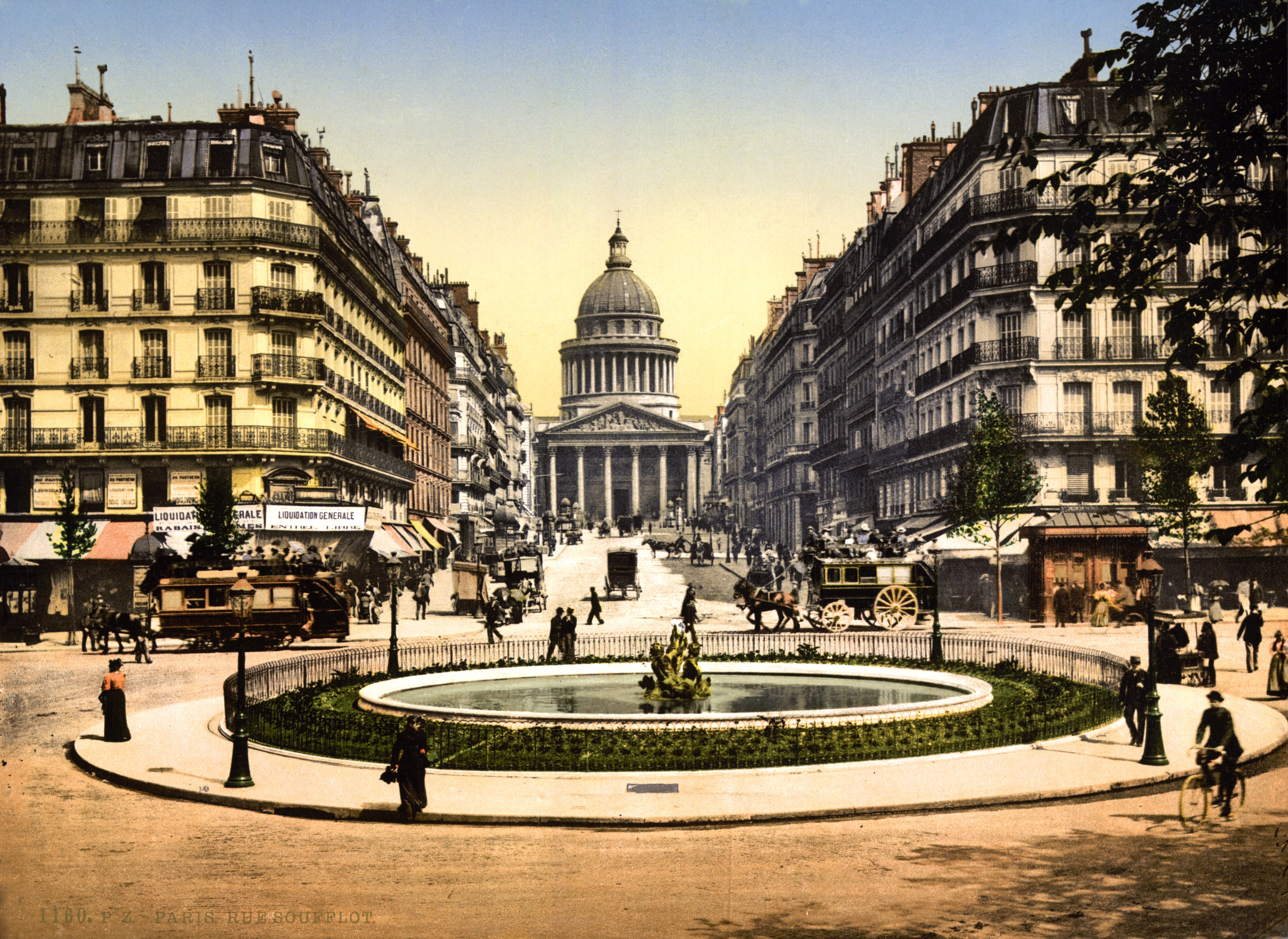
Rue Soufflot and the Place Edmond-Rostand with the Panthéon in the back seen from the Boulevard Saint-Michel, c. 1900

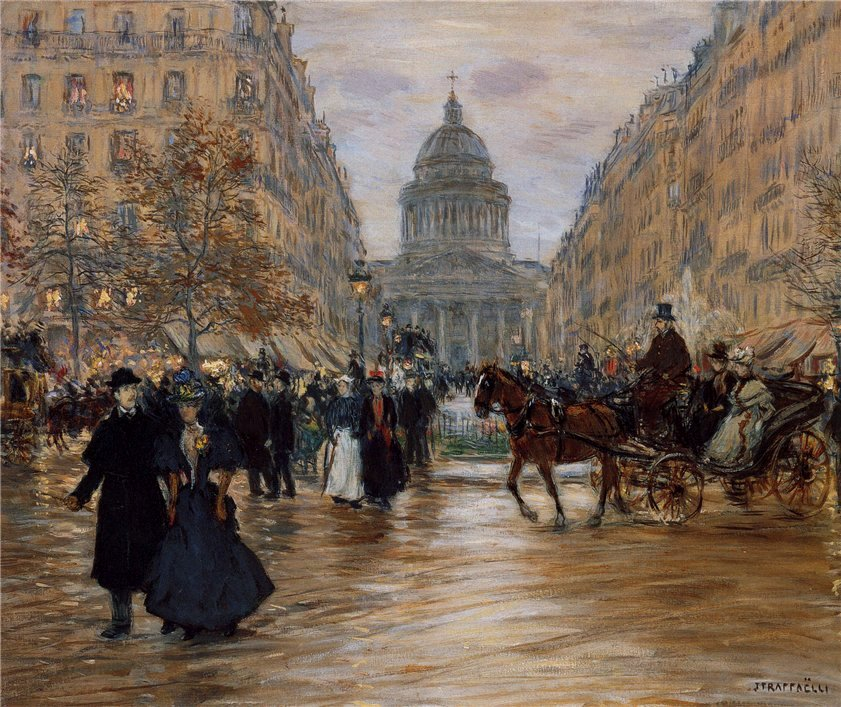
1918 painting of the Boulevard Saint-Michel and the Rue Soufflot by Jean-François Raffaëlli

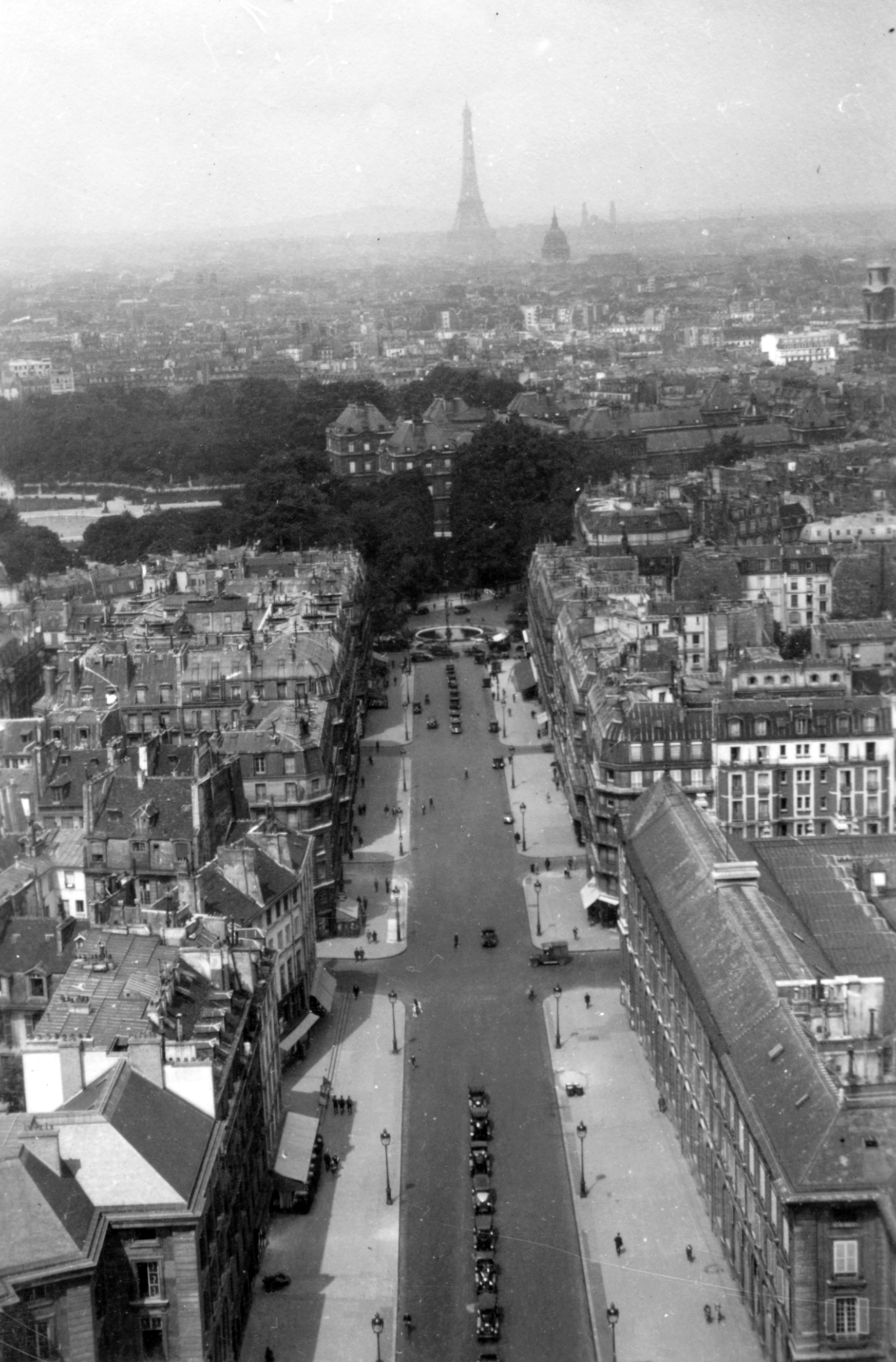
Rue Soufflot from the Panthéon in 1930

The street is also mentioned in several 20th-century chansons such as Quartier latin by Léo Ferré (1967) and Place des grands hommes by Patrick Bruel (1989); in the latter, Bruel sings about walking down the Rue Soufflot towards the Place du Panthéon, the song's namesake, to meet old school friends.

On 21 May 1981, the day of his inauguration as President of France, François Mitterrand took the Rue Soufflot from the Place Edmond-Rostand to arrive to the Panthéon, where he laid roses on the tombs of Jean Moulin, Victor Schœlcher and Jean Jaurès. It is also usually part of the route used when transferring someone's remains to the Panthéon.

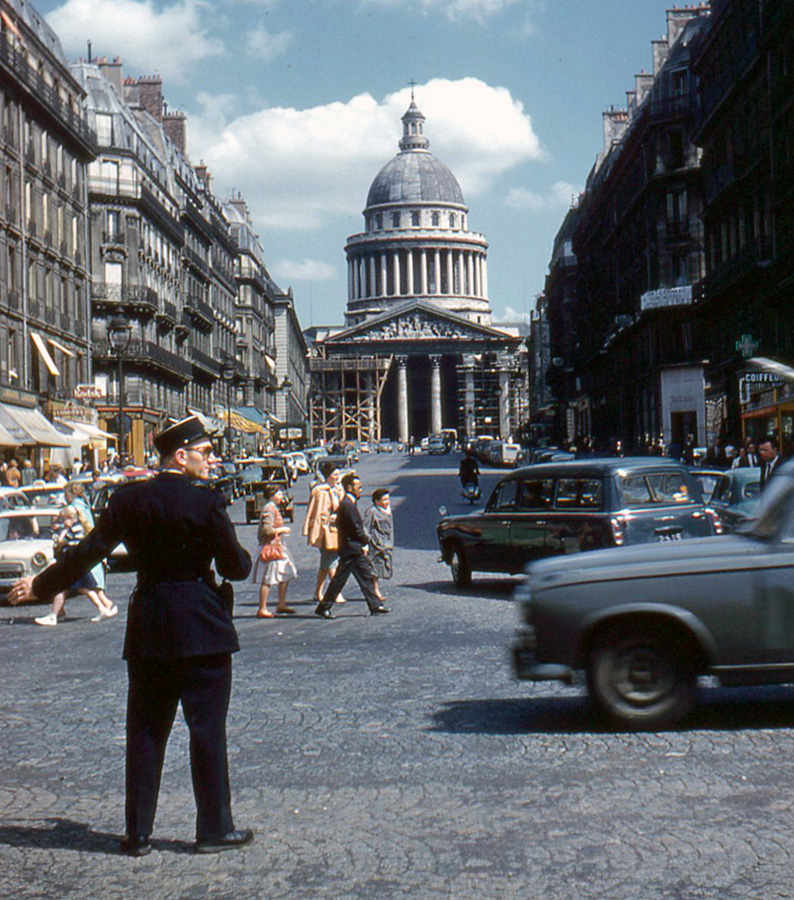
Rue Soufflot in 1960

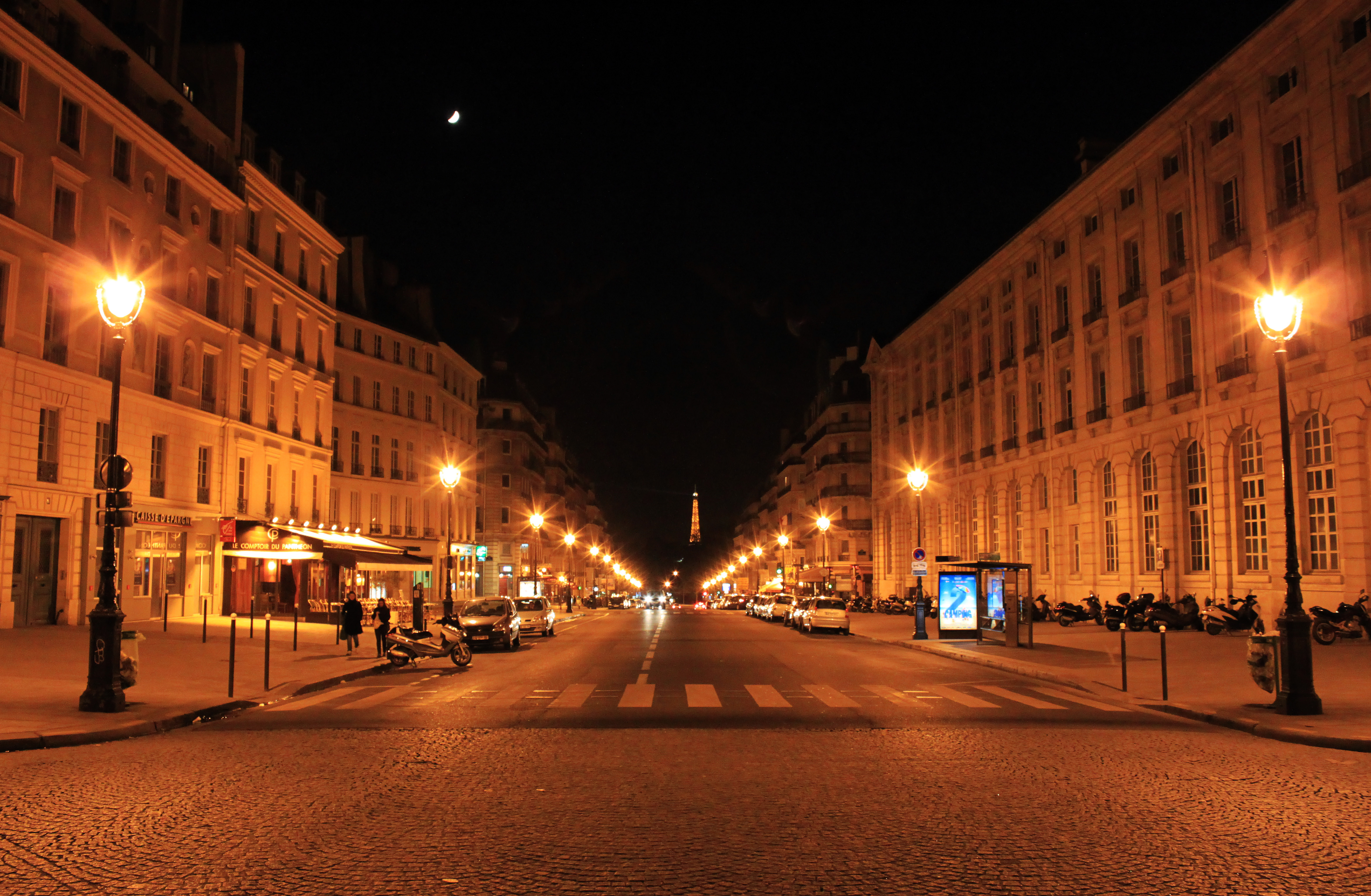
Rue Soufflot at night from the Place du Panthéon

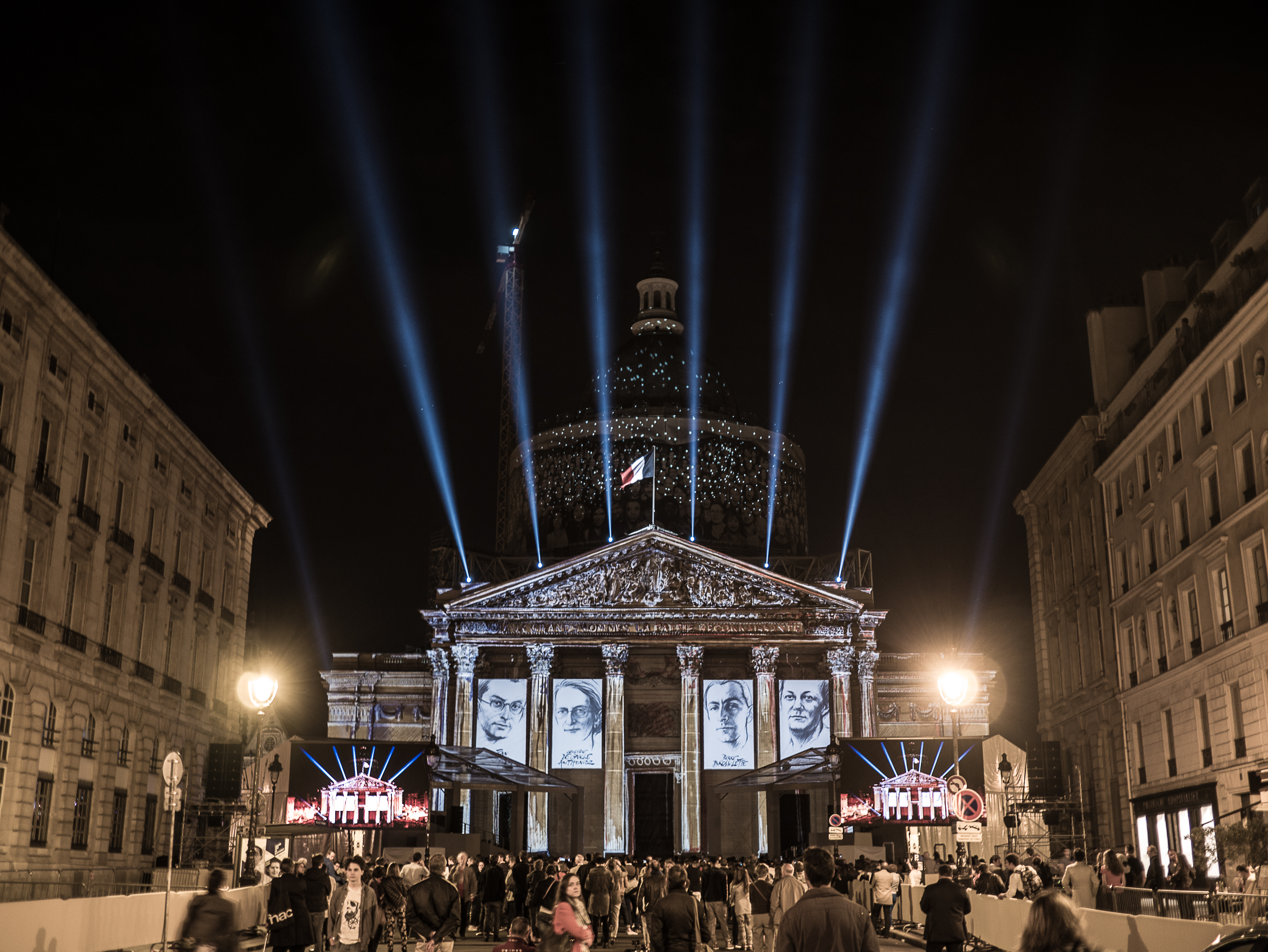
Rue Soufflot on 27 May 2015, as Germaine Tillion, Geneviève de Gaulle-Anthonioz, Pierre Brossolette and Jean Zay enter the Panthéon.

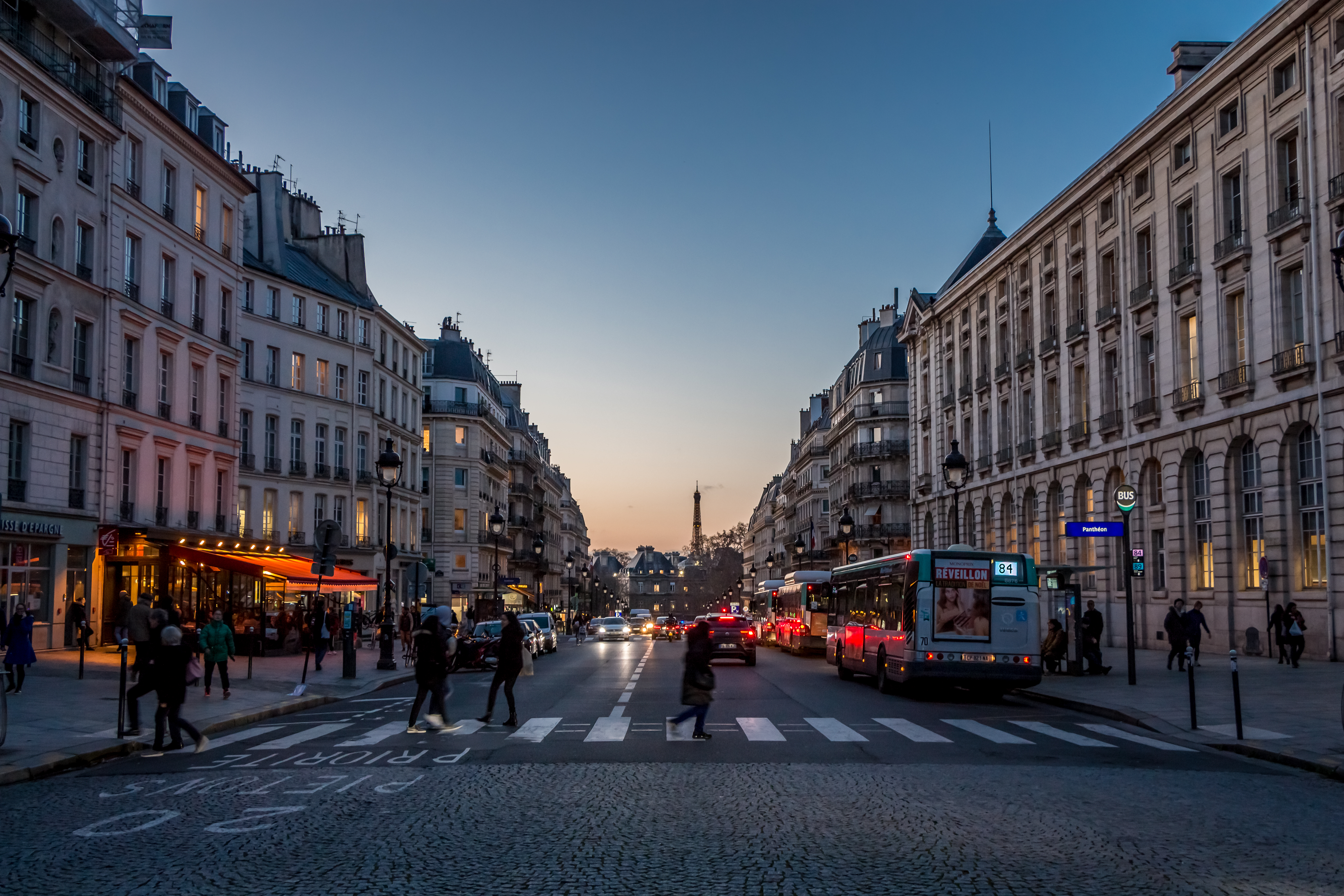
Rue Soufflot in 2019
