= Quartier du Val-de-Grâce =

Coordinates: 48.8408°N 2.3419°E

Val-de-Grâce
- neighborhood
- Quartier du Val-de-Grâce
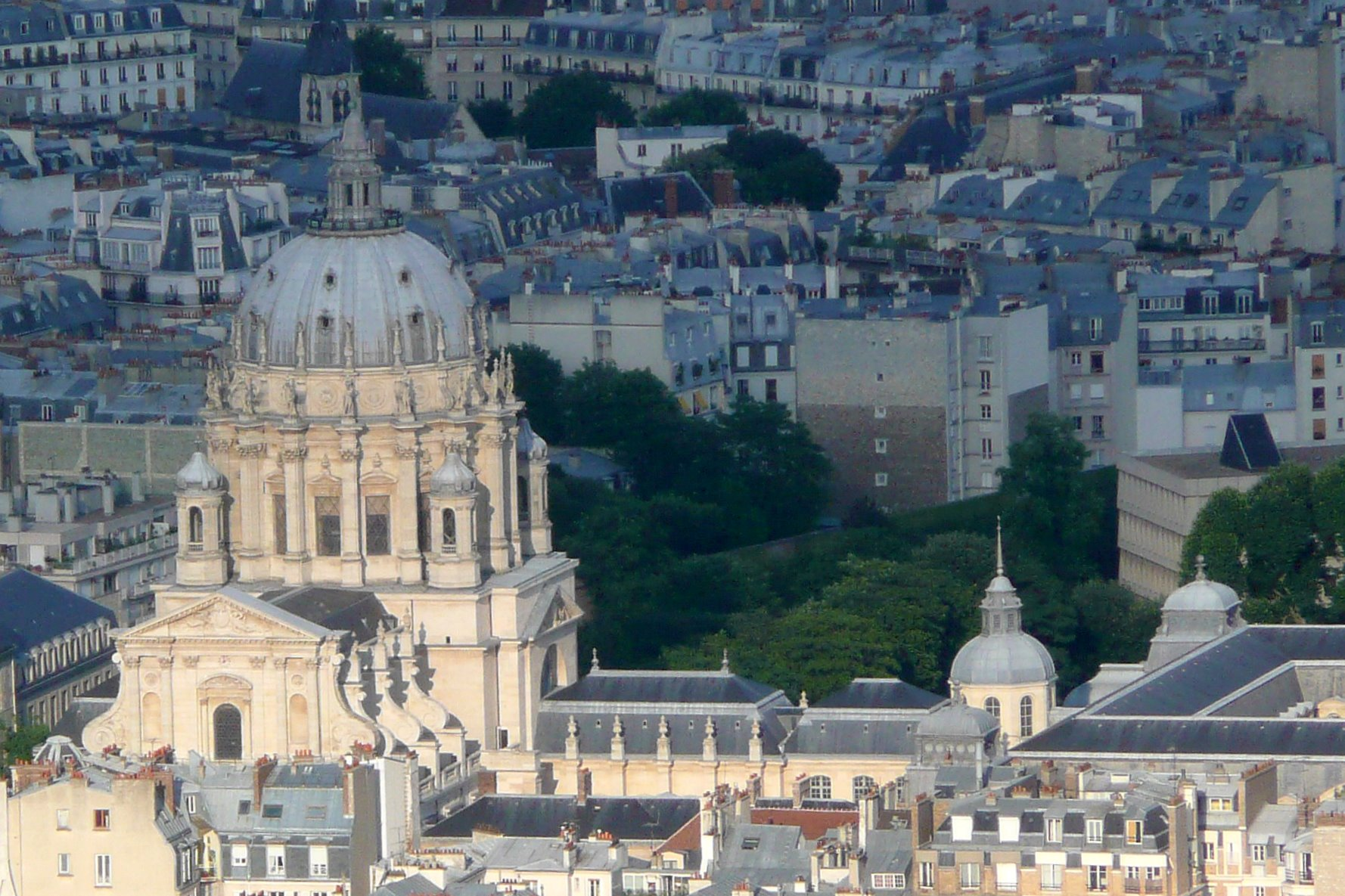
- Church of the Val-de-Grâce
- Interactive map of Val-de-Grâce
- Country: France
- Region: Île-de-France
- Ville: Paris
- Arrondissement: 5th

Area
  - Total: 0.704 km^{2} (0.272 sq mi)

Population (2016)
  - Total: 19,667
  - Density: 27,936/km^{2} (72,350/sq mi)

The four administrative districts of the 5th arrondissement.

The quartier du Val-de-Grâce is the 19th administrative district or 'quartier' of Paris, located in the 5th arrondissement of the city. Its borders are boulevard de Port-Royal to the south, boulevard Saint-Michel to the west, rue Soufflot, rue des Fossés-Saint-Jacques and rue de l'Estrapade to the north and rue Mouffetard and rue Pascal to the east.

It is named for the Val-de-Grâce military hospital and former abbey on boulevard de Port-Royal.

== Transport ==
- RER B stations:
  - Luxembourg station.
  - Port-Royal station.

== Notable sites and attractions ==
- Val-de-Grâce hospital and its church.
- Numerous prestigious institutions of higher education and research:
  - École normale supérieure on Rue d'Ulm.
  - Institut national agronomique on Rue Claude-Bernard.
  - Institut Curie on Rue d'Ulm and Rue Lhomond.
  - École supérieure de physique et de chimie industrielles de la ville de Paris on Rue Vauquelin.
  - École nationale supérieure de chimie de Paris on Rue Pierre-et-Marie-Curie.
  - École nationale supérieure des arts décoratifs on Rue d'Ulm.
- Institut national des jeunes sourds on Rue Saint-Jacques.
- Institut de géographie on Rue Saint-Jacques.
- Institut océanographique de Paris on Rue Saint-Jacques.
- The Schola Cantorum on Rue Saint-Jacques.
- Places of worship:
  - Church of the Val-de-Grâce on Rue Saint-Jacques.
  - Church of Saint-Jacques du Haut-Pas on Rue Saint-Jacques.
  - Lutheran church of Saint-Marcel on Rue Pierre-Nicole.
