= Church of Saint-Éphrem-le-Syriaque =

Syriac Catholic church in Paris, France

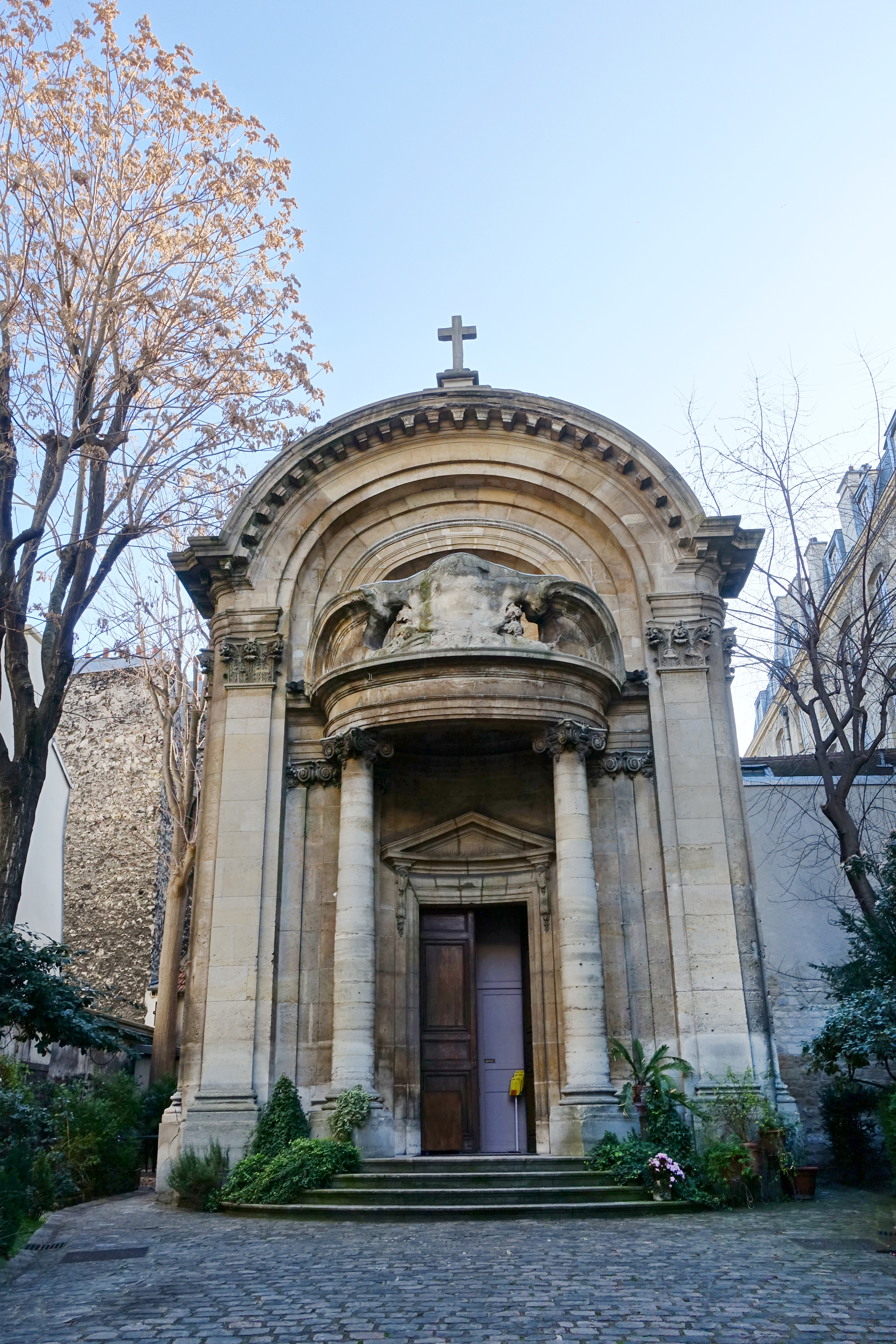

Religion
- Affiliation: Syriac Catholic
- Region: Ile de France

Location
- Country: France
- Interactive map of Church of Saint-Éphrem-le-Syriaque
- Coordinates: 48.84833°N 2.34778°E

Architecture
- Architect: Pierre Boscry

Saint-Éphrem-le-Syriaque is a Syriac Catholic church in the 5th arrondissement of Paris, in the quartier de la Sorbonne, at 17, Rue des Carmes.
