= Maigret Rents a Room =

1951 detective novel by Georges Simenon

Maigret Rents a Room (French: Maigret en meublé) is a 1951 detective novel by the Belgian writer Georges Simenon featuring Jules Maigret of the French Judicial police. It was written in Lakeville, Connecticut in February 1951 and first published by Presses de la Cité the same year. The 65th in the series, was first translated into English by Robert Brain in 1960 and later in 2016 by Shaun Whiteside.

== Synopsis ==
Detective Janvier is surveiling a boarding house in Rue Lhomond for one of two suspects in a bar robbery when he is shot in the chest and seriously wounded. With Janvier in stable condition, and Mme Maigret as it happens visiting her sister Alsace before an operation, Maigret rents a room and marinates in a surprisingly cohesive milieu. From which the motivation for the shooting is far removed and orthogonal, rooted as it is in guilt and crime of some 20 before...

== Adaptations ==
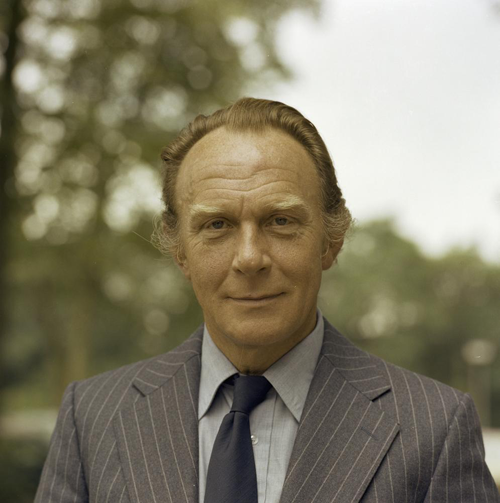
Kees Brusse in 1978

- The Cactus, Rupert Davies, BBC TV, 16 January 1961
- Maigret op kamers, Kees Brusse, 28 February 1965, Netherlands
- Maigret en meublé, Jean Richard, ORTF, 23 December 1972
- Keishi fujin no inai yoru, Kinya Aikawa, 警視夫人のいない夜 (No Wife Night], ABC, 7 July 1978, Japan
- Maigret en meublé, Bruno Crémer, 17 December 2004
