= Arènes de Lutèce =

Ancient Roman amphitheatre in Paris

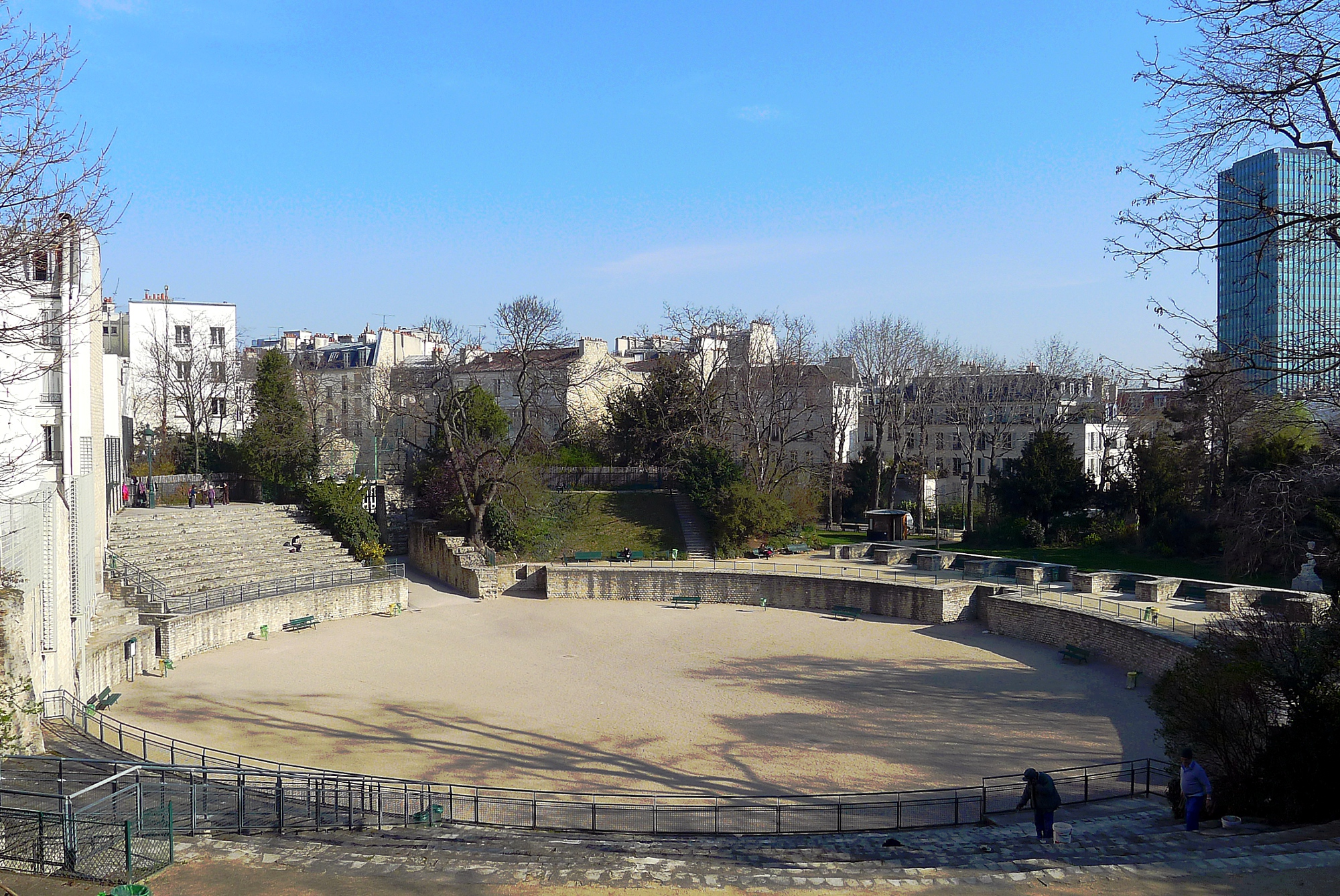
- The Arènes de Lutèce

- Location within Paris Location within France
- 48°50′42″N 2°21′10″E
- Type: Roman amphitheatre
- Periods: Roman Empire
- Location: 5th arrondissement, Paris, France

History
- Built: 1st century

The Arènes de Lutèce ([a.ʁɛn də ly.tɛs], "Arenas of Lutetia") are among the most important ancient Roman remains in Paris (known in antiquity as Lutetia), together with the Thermes de Cluny. Constructed in the 1st century AD, this theatre could once seat 15,000 people and was used also as an amphitheatre to show gladiatorial combats.

The terraced seating surrounded more than half of the arena's circumference, more typical of an ancient Greek theatre rather than a Roman one which was semi-circular.

The orchestra was surrounded by the wall of a podium 2.5 m (8.2 feet) high, surmounted by a parapet. The stage was 41 m (135 ft) long. A series of nine niches were most likely used for statues. Five small rooms were situated beneath the lower terraces, some of which appear to have been animal cages that opened directly into the arena.

One can still observe significant remnants of the stage and its nine niches, as well as the grilled cages in the wall. The stepped terraces are not original, but historians believe that 41 arched openings punctuated the façade.

Slaves, the poor, and women were relegated to the higher tiers while the lower seating areas were reserved for Roman male citizens. For comfort, a linen awning sheltered spectators from the hot sun.

When Lutetia was sacked during the barbarian raids of 275, some of the structure's stone work was used to reinforce the city's defences around the Île de la Cité. However, Chilperic I had it repaired in 577 and gave performances there. Subsequently, the theatre became a cemetery, and was filled in completely following the construction of wall of Philippe Auguste (ca. 1210).

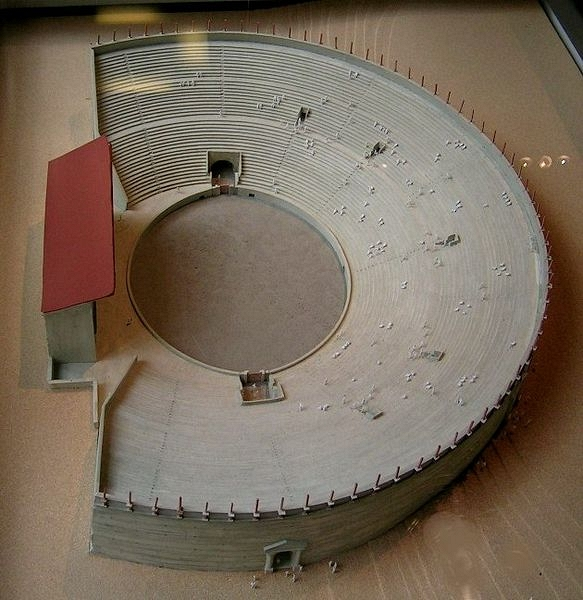
Scale model of the Arènes de Lutèce

Centuries later, even though the surrounding neighbourhood (quartier) had retained the name les Arènes, the exact location was lost. It was discovered by Théodore Vaquer during the building of the Rue Monge between 1860 and 1869, when the Compagnie Générale des Omnibus sought to build a tramway depot on the site.

Spearheaded by the author Victor Hugo (1802–1885) and a few other intellectuals, a preservation committee called la Société des Amis des Arènes undertook to save the archaeological treasure. In 1878 the face of a Roman baby was found preserved within the cement of a Roman sarcophagus buried within the walls of the Couvent des Filles de Jésus-Christ. Following the demolition of the convent in 1883, one-third of the arena was uncovered. The Municipal Council dedicated funds to restoring the arena and establishing it as a public square, which was opened in 1896.

After the tramway lines and depot were dismantled in 1916 and line 10 of the Paris Métro was constructed, the doctor and anthropologist Jean-Louis Capitan (1854–1929) continued with additional excavation and restoration of the arena toward the end of World War I. The neighbouring Square Capitan, built on the site of the old Saint-Victor reservoir, is dedicated to his memory. However, a portion of the original arena opposite the stage was lost to buildings which line rue Monge.

== See also ==
- List of Roman amphitheatres
