= Rue de l'Estrapade =

Street in the 5th arrondissement of Paris, France

Coordinates: 48.8447°N 2.3468°E

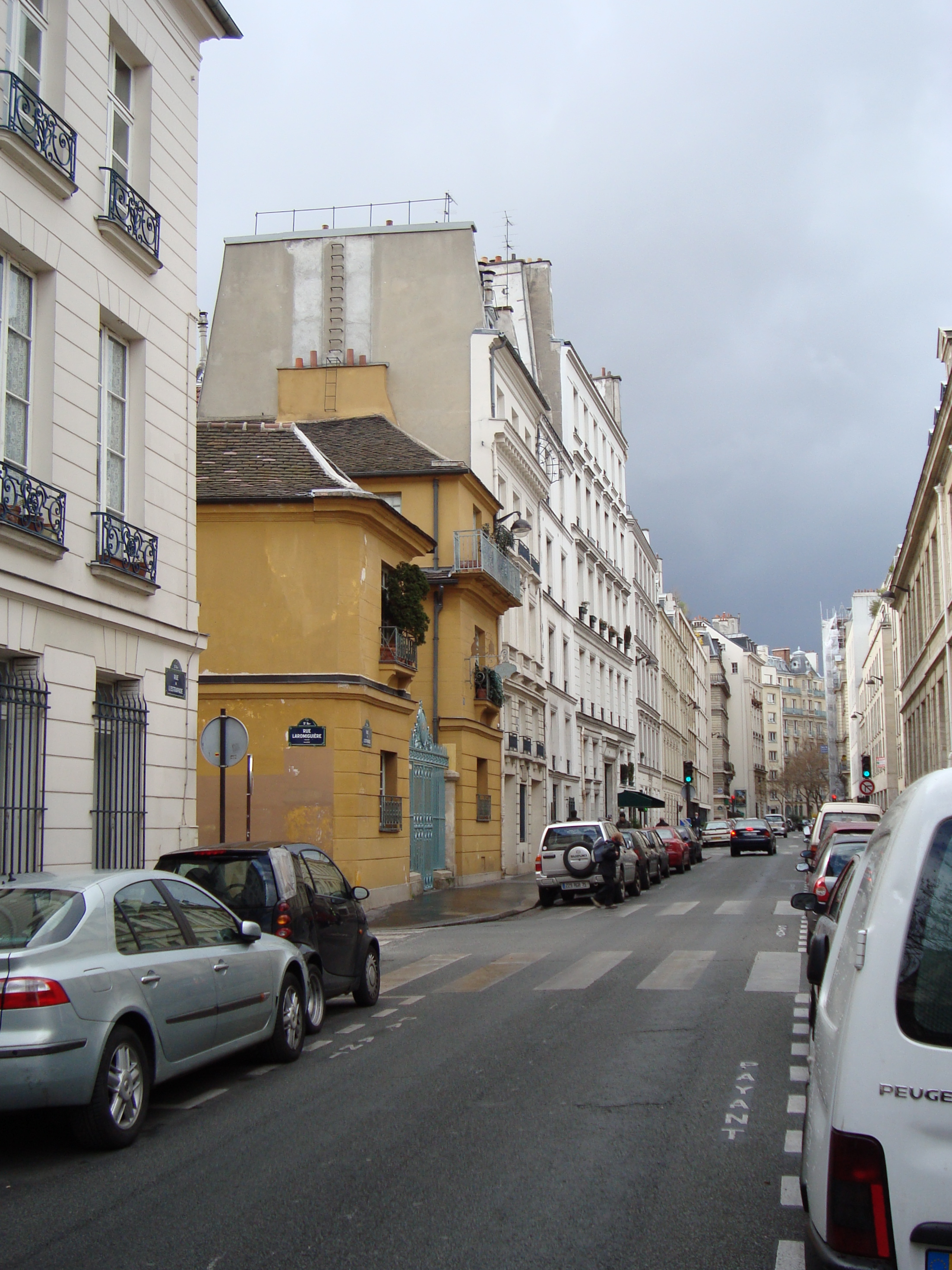
The Rue de l'Estrapade

The Rue de l’Estrapade is a street in the 5th arrondissement of Paris, situated at the border between the quartier du Val-de-Grâce and the quartier de la Sorbonne. It follows the line of the Wall of Philip II Augustus and is named after the 'estrapade' or strappado form of torture inflicted at the nearby Place de l'Estrapade, especially on several Protestants during their torture.
