= Place du Panthéon =

Public square in Paris, France

Coordinates: 48.8465°N 2.3449°E

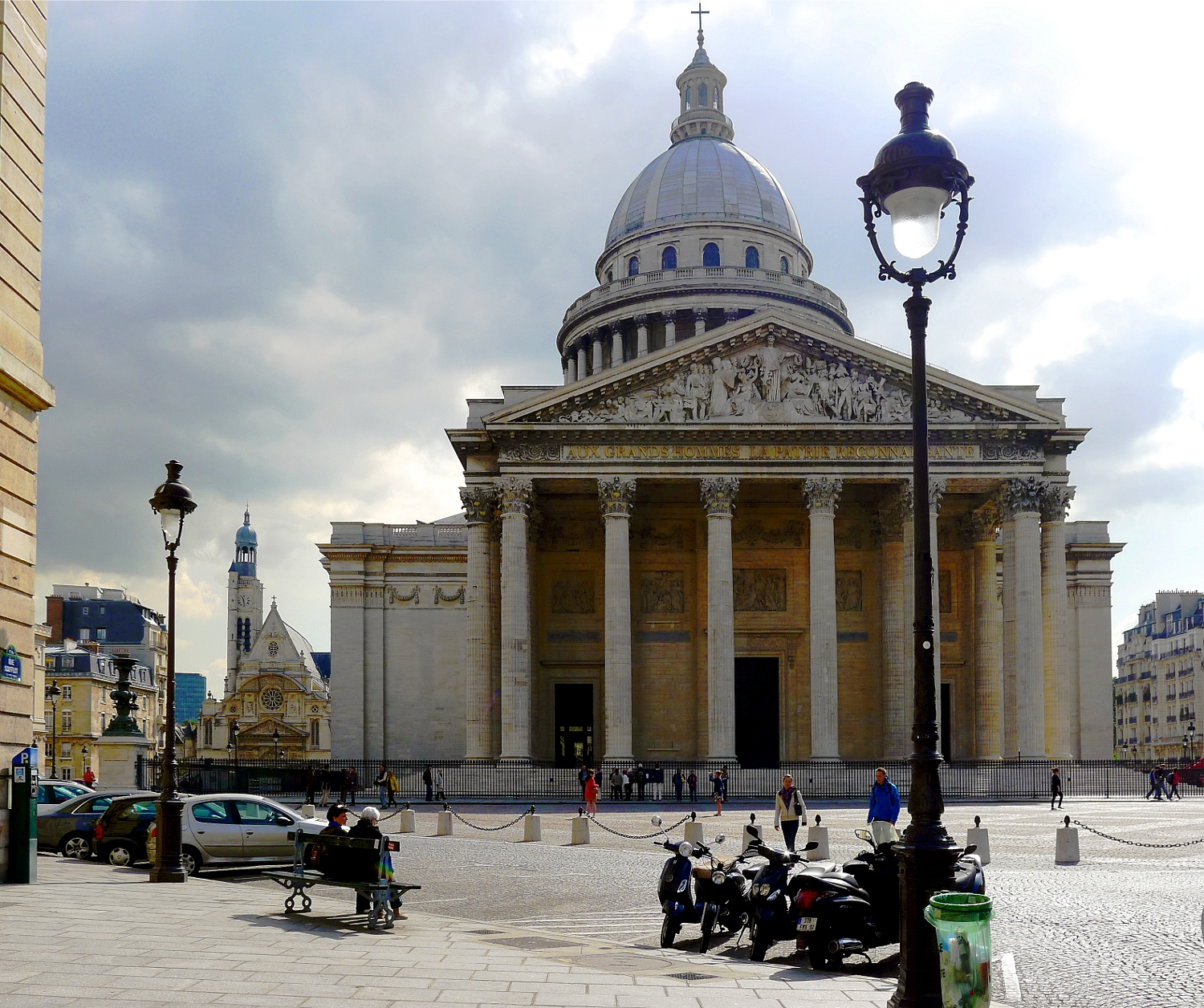
The Place du Panthéon seen from Rue Soufflot in 2011

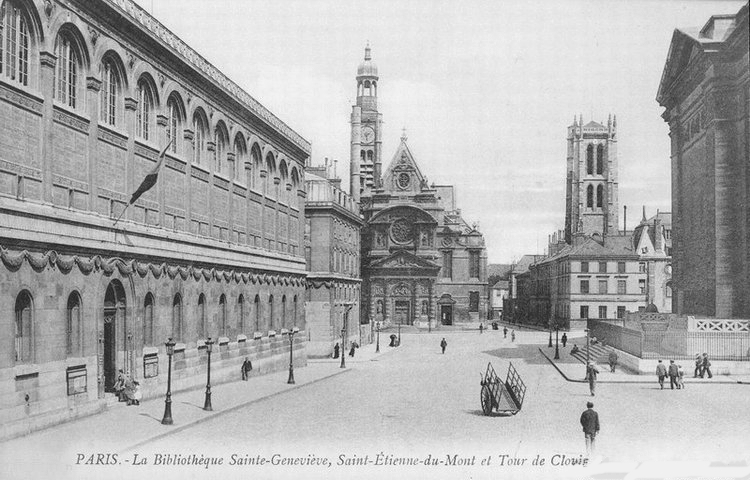
Sainte-Geneviève Library, Saint-Étienne-du-Mont, Henri-IV and the Panthéon (right), c. 1900

The Place du Panthéon (French pronunciation: [plas dy pɑ̃teɔ̃]; lit. 'Square of the Panthéon') is a square in the 5th arrondissement of Paris. Located in the Latin Quarter, it is named after and surrounds the Panthéon.

The Rue Soufflot, west of the Place du Panthéon, runs towards the Boulevard Saint-Michel. The Lycée Henri-IV, former Abbey of Saint Genevieve, is located east of the square, just south of Saint-Étienne-du-Mont.

== Gallery ==
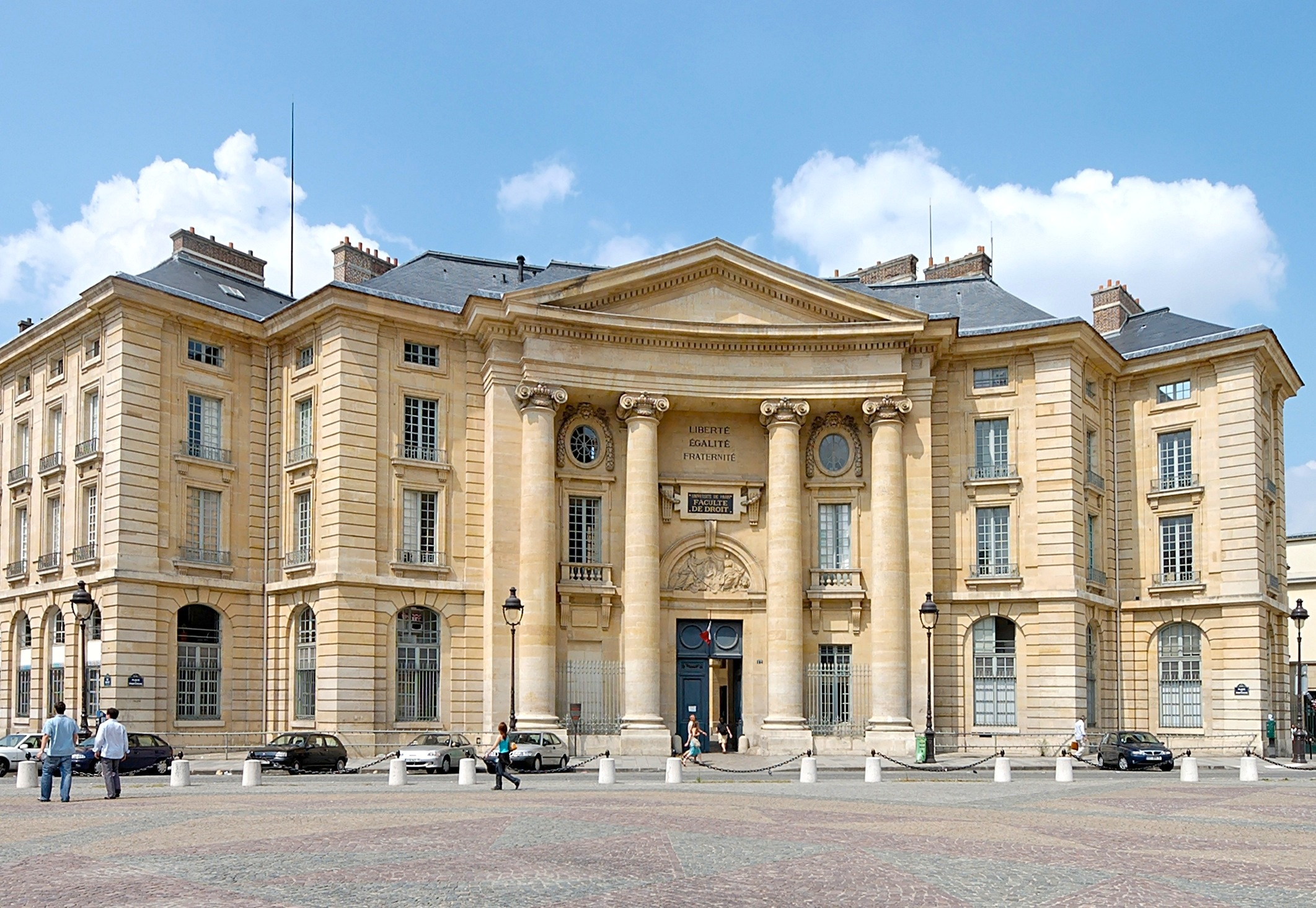
Main building of Panthéon-Assas University and Panthéon-Sorbonne University on the Place du Panthéon

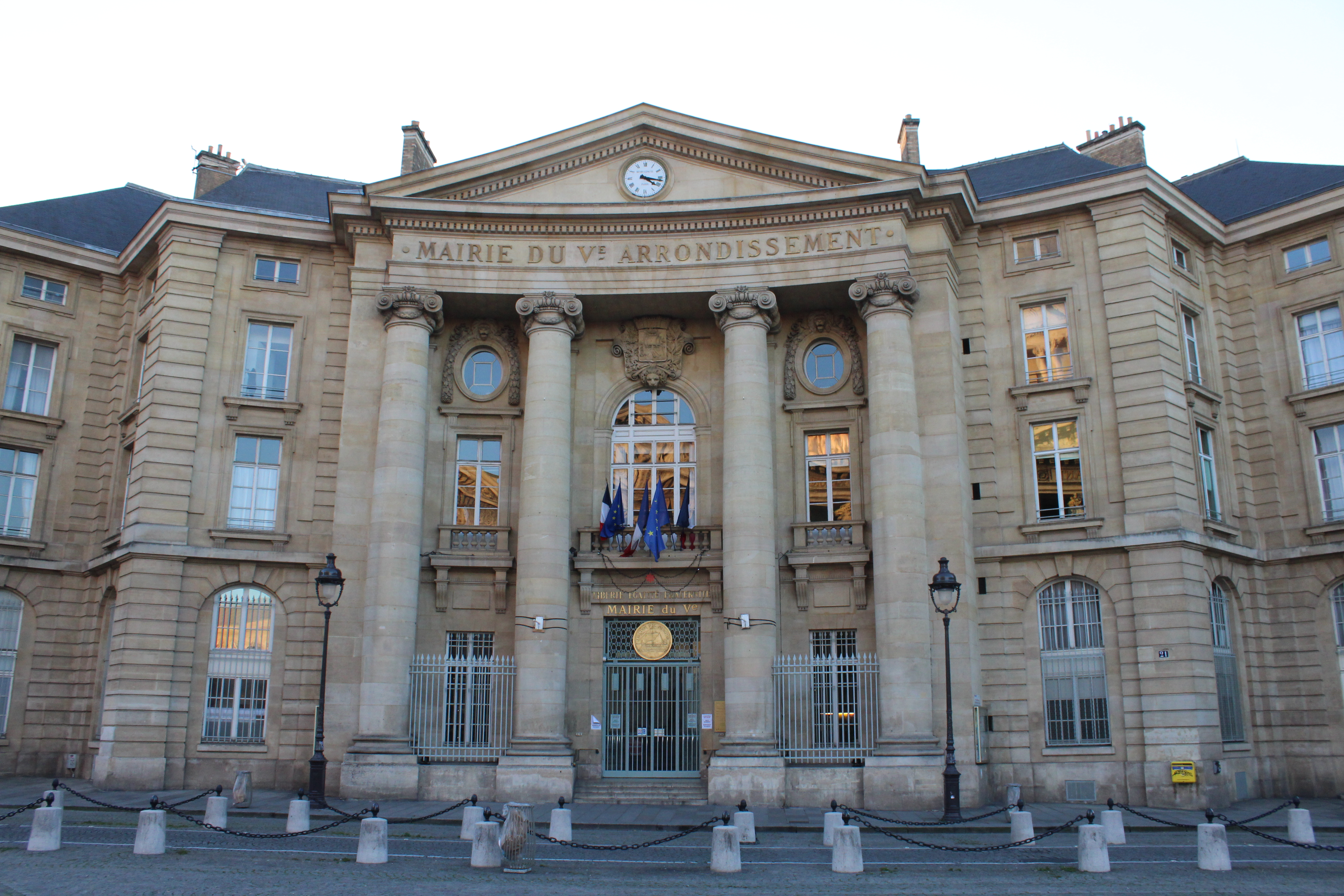
Mairie du V^{e} arrondissement de Paris on the Place du Panthéon

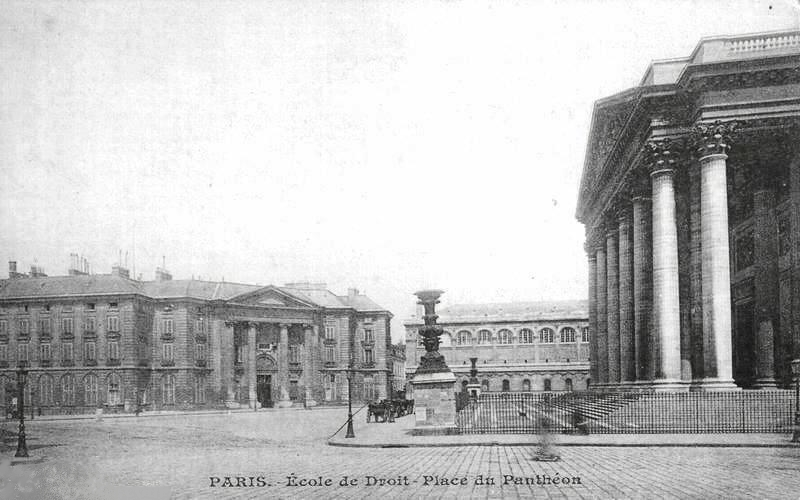
The Place du Panthéon c. 1900

Map of the Place du Panthéon

== See also ==
- Squares in Paris
