= Quartier de la Sorbonne =

20th administrative district or 'quartier' of Paris, France

Coordinates: 48.8492°N 2.3444°E

The 'quartiers' of the 5th arrondissement of Paris.

The Quartier de la Sorbonne is the 20th administrative district or 'quartier' of Paris, France. It is located in the 5th arrondissement of Paris, near the jardin du Luxembourg and the Sorbonne, on the Montagne Sainte-Geneviève. It contains Paris' main higher educational establishments and institutes and borders the Latin Quarter.

Its borders are the river Seine to the north, the Boulevard Saint-Michel to the west, rue Soufflot, rue des Fossés-Saint-Jacques and rue de l'Estrapade to the south and rue Descartes, rue de la Montagne-Sainte-Geneviève, rue Frédéric-Sauton and rue du Haut-Pavé to the east.
