= Thermes de Cluny =

Parisian ruins of Roman baths

Coordinates: 48°51′03″N 02°20′36″E

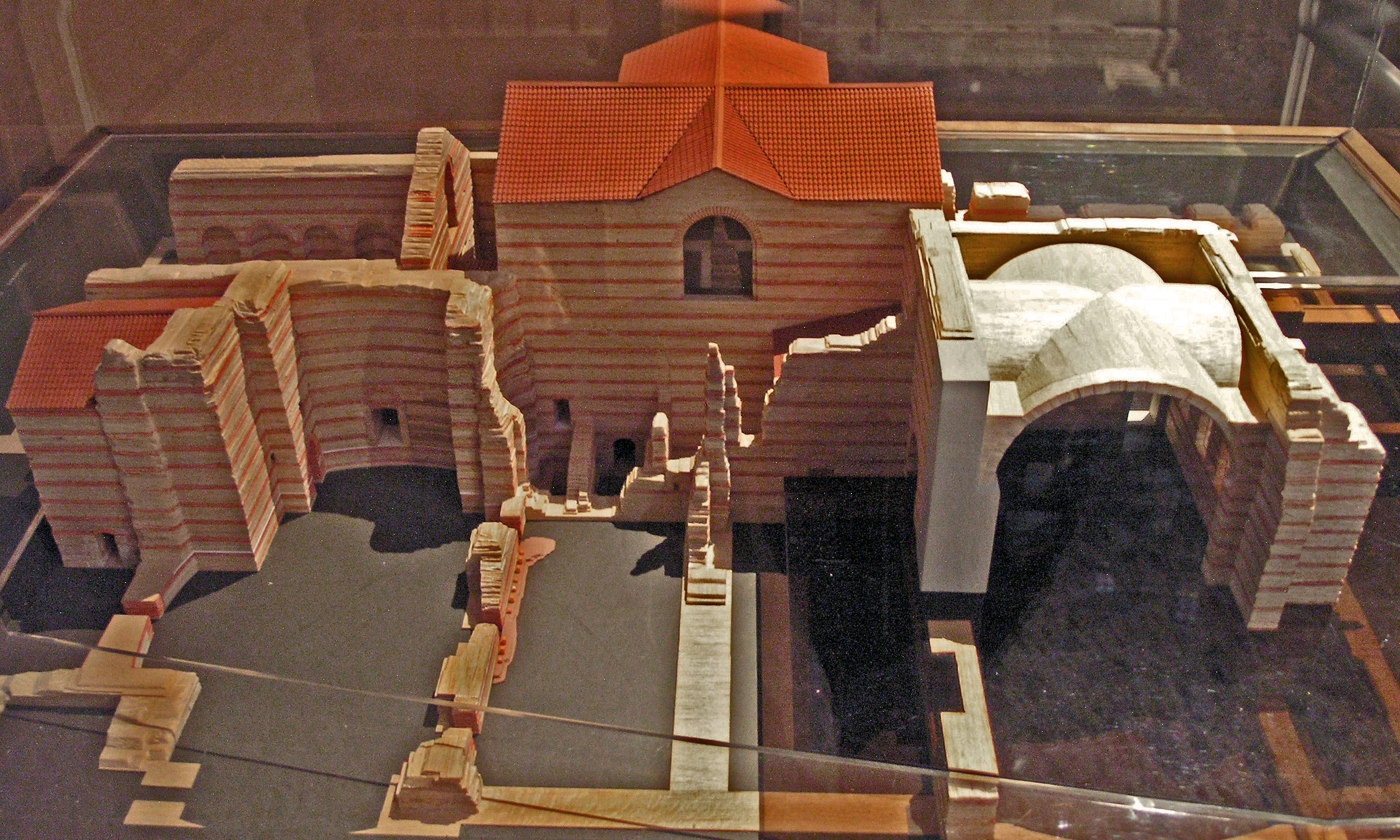
Model of Thermes de Cluny showing the major elements of the baths. In the center of the picture is the frigidarium; to the left is the tepidarium; to the fore of the tepidarium is the caldarium. Boulevard Saint-Michel forms the left boundary of the picture, Boulevard Saint-Germain forms the top boundary.

The Thermes de Cluny (French pronunciation: [tɛʁm də klyni]) are the ruins of Gallo-Roman thermal baths lying in the heart of Paris' 5th arrondissement, and which are partly subsumed into the Musée National du Moyen Âge - Thermes et Hôtel de Cluny.

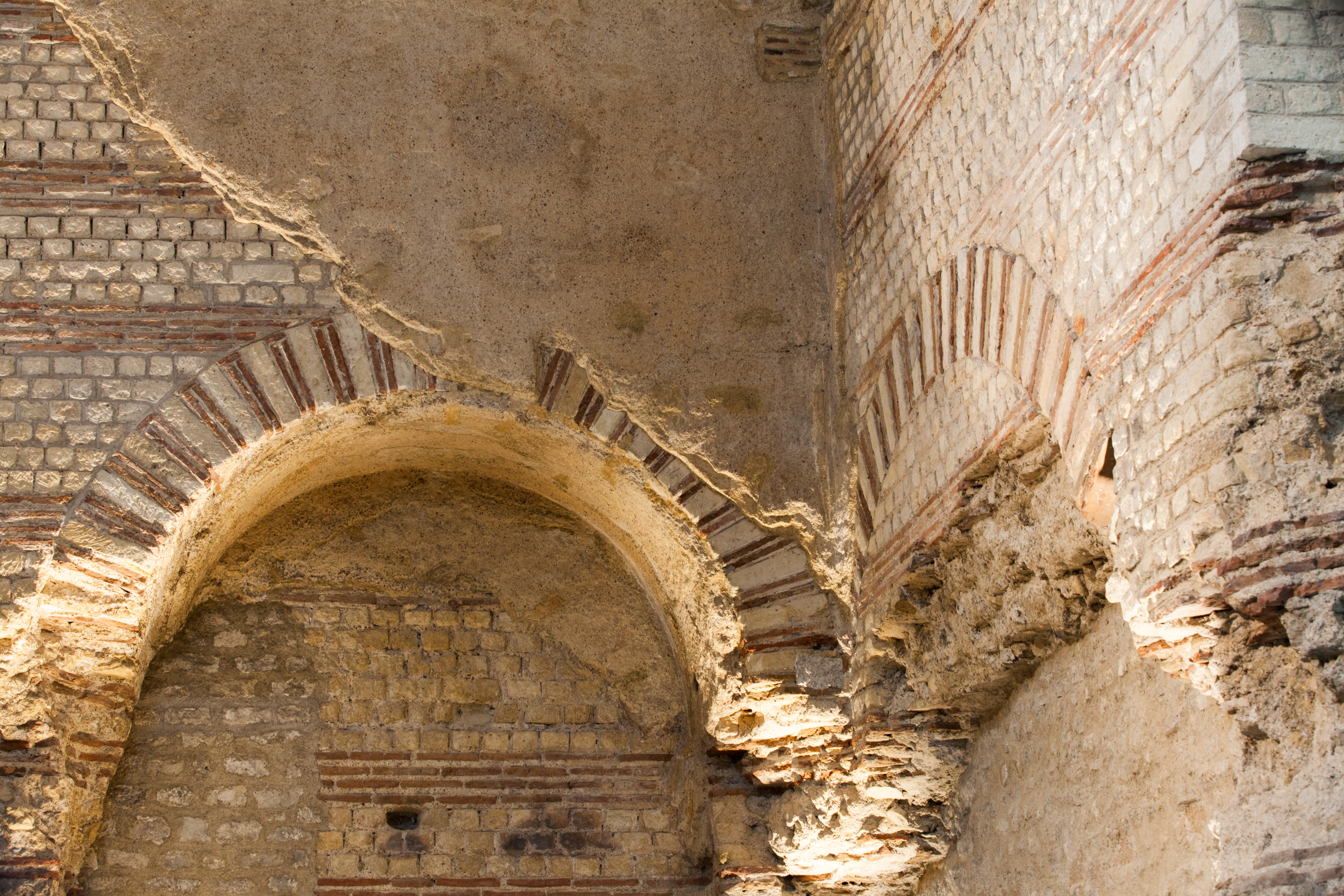
Thermes de Cluny, frigidarium (details)

== History ==
The present bath ruins constitute about one-third of a massive bath complex that is believed to have been constructed around the beginning of the 3rd century. The best preserved room is the frigidarium, with intact architectural elements such as Gallo-Roman vaults, ribs and consoles, and fragments of original decorative wall painting and mosaics.

It is believed that the bath complex was built by the influential guild of boatmen of 3rd-century Roman Paris or Lutetia, as the consoles on which the barrel ribs rest are carved in the shape of ships' prows. Like all Roman Baths, these baths were freely open to the public, and were meant to be, at least partially, a means of romanizing the ancient Gauls. As the baths lay across the Seine river on the Left Bank and were unprotected by defensive fortifications, they were easy prey to roving barbarian groups, who apparently destroyed the bath complex sometime at the end of the 3rd century.

The bath complex is partly an archaeological site, and has partly been incorporated into the Musée National du Moyen Age (or Musée de Cluny). It is the occasional repository for historic stonework or masonry found from time to time in Paris. The spectacular frigidarium is entirely incorporated within the museum and houses the Pilier des Nautes (Pillar of the Boatmen). Although somewhat obscured by renovations and reuse over the past two thousand years, several other rooms from the bath complex are also incorporated into the museum, notably the gymnasium, which now forms part of gallery 9 (Gallery of French Kings and sculptures from Notre Dame that were taken down during the iconoclasm of the French Revolution). The caldarium (hot water room) and the tepidarium (warm water room) are both still present as ruins outside the Musée and on the museum's grounds.

== See also ==
- List of Roman public baths

== Sources ==
- Album du Musée national du Moyen Age Thermes de Cluny, Pierre-Yves Le Pogam, Dany Sandron ISBN 2-7118-2777-1
- Architect’s Guide to Paris, Renzo Salvadori, (ISBN 0-408-50068-9) London, 1990.
- Caesar to Charlemagne: The beginning of France, Robert Latouche, (ISBN 0-460-07728-7) 1968.
- Round and about Paris, Vol. 1, Thirza Vallois (ISBN 0-9525378-0-X), 1995.
