= Rue Lhomond =

Street in Paris, France

Coordinates: 48.8438°N 2.3460°E

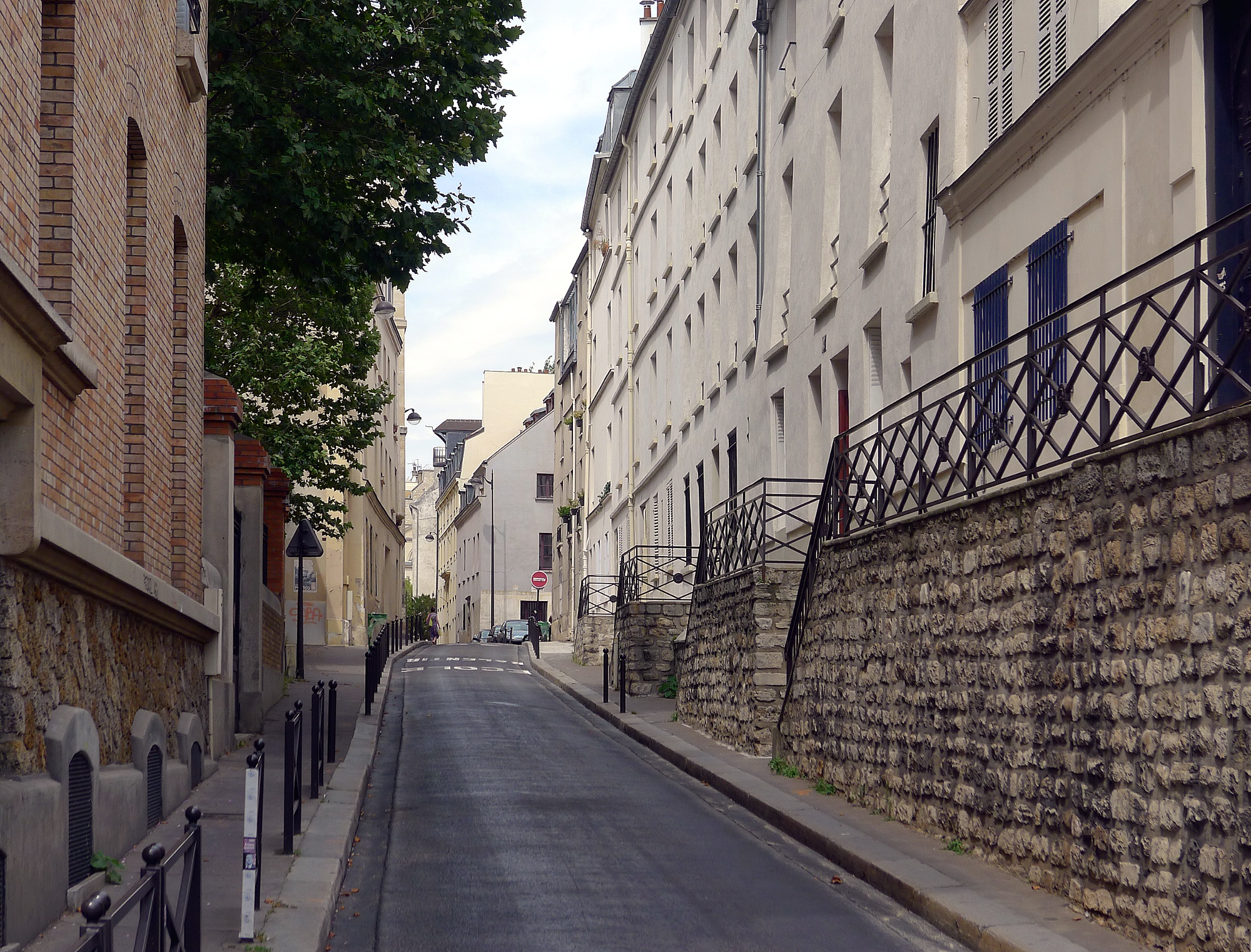
View of the lower part of the street

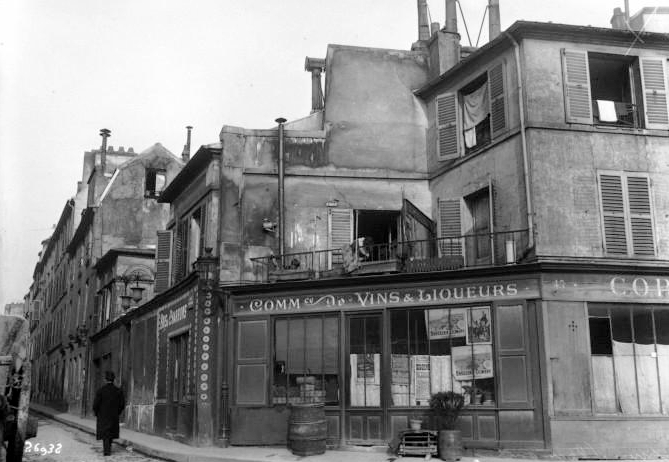
Rue Lhomond in 1913

The Rue Lhomond is a street in the 5th arrondissement of Paris, France. It is located in the quartier du Val-de-Grâce and has existed since the 15th century.

== Origin of the name ==
It was once known as the Rue des Poteries after its Gallo-Roman pottery workshops (re-discovered in the 18th century), then from around 1600 as the Rue des Pots and finally the Rue des Postes. It was given its present name in 1867 after the priest, grammarian and scholar Charles François Lhomond (1727-1794).

== History ==
The street has housed several Catholic seminaries and convents, along with a British seminary established at no. 22 by permission of King Louis XIV in 1684 and active until 1790.

The Rue Lhomond features in the Georges Simenon novel Maigret Takes a Room. In the novel, Maigret takes a room in a boarding house to discover who shot his subordinate Janvier.
