= Rue Saint-Jacques, Paris =

Street in Paris, France

Rue Saint-Jacques
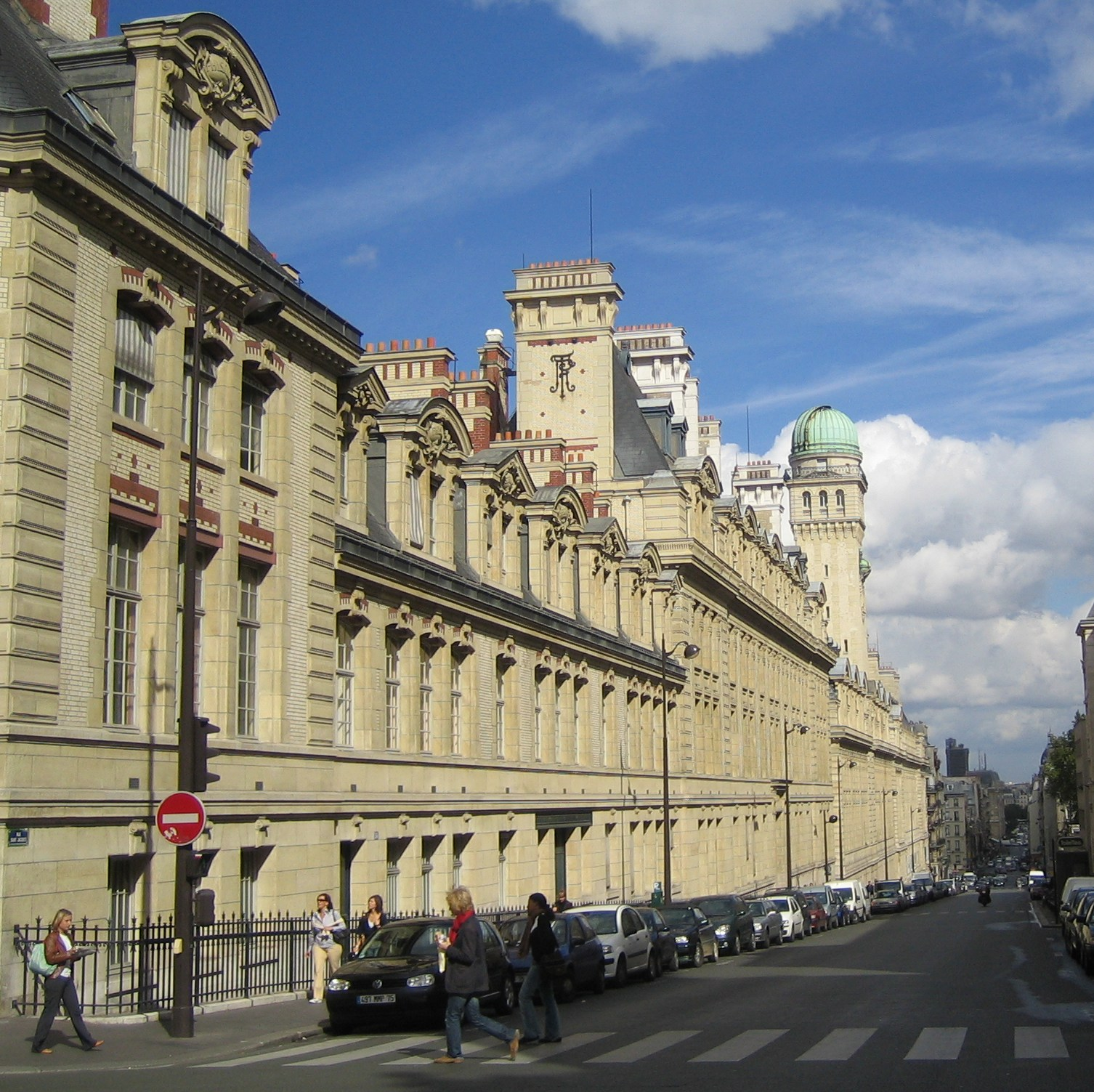
- Rue Saint-Jacques and the Sorbonne

- Location within Paris
- Length: 1,550 m (5,090 ft)
- Width: 16 to 20 m (52 to 66 ft)
- Arrondissement: 5th
- Quarter: Sorbonne, Val de Grâce
- Coordinates: 48°50′48″N 2°20′36″E
- From: 79 Rue Galande
- To: 84 Boulevard de Port-Royal

Construction
- Denomination: 1806

The Rue Saint-Jacques (French pronunciation: [ʁy sɛ̃ ʒak]) is a street in the Latin Quarter of Paris.

== History ==
Formerly lying along the cardo of Roman Lutetia, this street was a main axial road of medieval Paris, as the buildings that still front it attest. It is the historic starting point, at no. 252, the Église Saint-Jacques-du-Haut-Pas, for pilgrims leaving Paris to make their way along the Chemin de Saint-Jacques that led eventually to Santiago de Compostela (James, Jacques, Jacob, and Iago being names of the same saint in English, French, Latin, and Spanish, respectively). However, the introduction of the Boulevard Saint-Michel, constructed through this old quarter of Paris by Baron Haussmann, relegated the roughly parallel Rue Saint-Jacques to a backstreet.

The Paris base of the Dominican Order was established in 1218 under the leadership of Pierre Seilhan (or Seila) in the Chapelle Saint-Jacques, close to the Porte Saint-Jacques, on this street; this is why the Dominicans were called Jacobins in Paris. Thus the street's name is indirectly responsible for the Jacobin Club in the French Revolution getting that name (being based in a former Jacobin monastery, itself located elsewhere). Johann Heynlin and Guillaume Fichet established the first printing press in France, briefly at the Sorbonne and then on this street, in the 1470s. The second printers in Paris were Peter Kayser and Johann Stohl at the sign of the Soleil d'Or in the Rue Saint-Jacques, from 1473. The proximity of the Sorbonne led many later booksellers and printers to set up shop here also.

== Notable sites ==
- The Sorbonne
- The Lycée Louis-le-Grand
- The Institut de géographie of Panthéon-Sorbonne University at 191 Rue Saint-Jacques
- No. 163bis: Le Port du Salut, an 18th-century inn, had a cabaret where many artistes made their debuts: Guy Béart, Barbara, Georges Moustaki, Pierre Perret, Jean Yanne, Coluche, Serge Gainsbourg, Boby Lapointe between 1955 and 1982.
- No. 195: Institut océanographique
- No. 252: the Église Saint-Jacques-du-Haut-Pas, in the classical style, once a centre of Jansenism, burial place of the astronomer Cassini (built between 1670 and 1684 to the designs of Erard and of Daniel Gittard).
- No. 244: associated with André Salmon and the revue Le Festin d'Esope, founded by him and his friends Edmond-Marie Poullain, Apollinaire and others.
- No. 284: previous location of the Carmelite convent, Faubourg Saint-Jacques, otherwise the Carmel de l'Incarnation (couvent des Carmélites du faubourg Saint-Jacques), founded in 1603 and closed during the French Revolution, then demolished in 1797.

== See also ==
- 2023 Paris explosion, which happened on the street
