= Boulevard Saint-Michel =

Boulevard in Paris, France

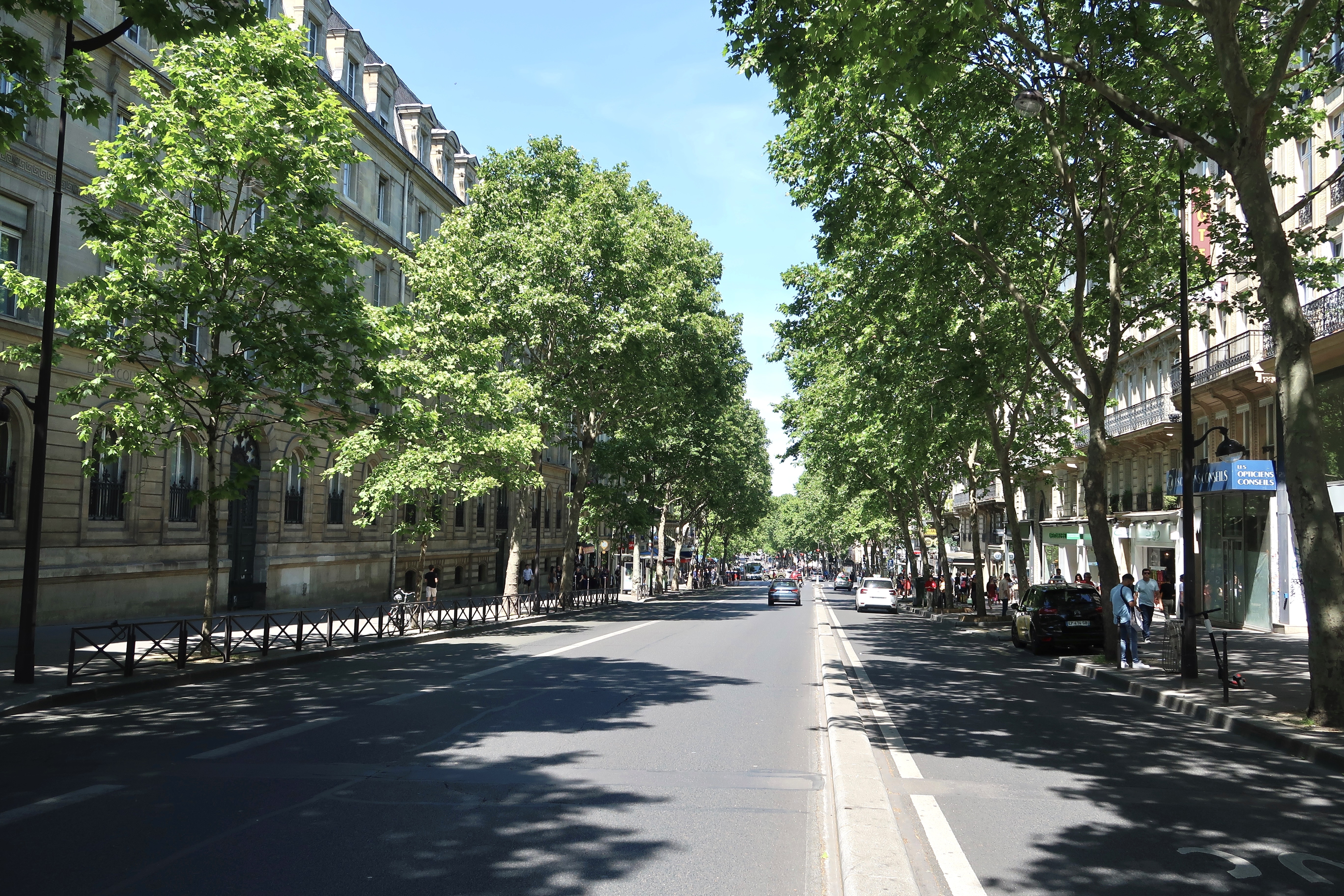
- Boulevard Saint-Michel, Paris

- Location within Paris
- Length: 1,380 m (4,530 ft)
- Width: 30 m (98 ft)
- Arrondissement: 5th and 6th
- Quarter: Sorbonne and Odéon
- Coordinates: 48°51′00.00″N 2°20′32.90″E
- From: Place Saint-Michel
- To: Place Ernest Denis

Construction
- Completion: 1855
- Denomination: 26 February 1867

The Boulevard Saint-Michel (French pronunciation: [bulvaʁ sɛ̃ miʃɛl]) is one of the two major streets in the Latin Quarter of Paris, France, the other being the Boulevard Saint-Germain. It is a tree-lined boulevard which runs south from the Pont Saint-Michel on the Seine and Place Saint-Michel, crosses the Boulevard Saint-Germain and continues alongside the Sorbonne and the Jardin du Luxembourg, ending at the Place Camille Jullian just before the Port-Royal RER station and the Avenue de l'Observatoire. It was created by Baron Haussmann to run parallel to the Rue Saint-Jacques which marks the historical north-south axis of Paris. It is known colloquially as Boul'Mich' in French.

The boulevard serves as a boundary between the 5th and 6th arrondissements of Paris; odd-numbered buildings on the eastern side are in the 5th arrondissement and even numbers on the western side are in the 6th. It has a length of 1,380 m (4,530 ft), an average width of 30 m (98 ft) and takes its name from the Pont Saint-Michel.

As the central axis of the Latin Quarter, it has long been a hotbed of student life and activism, but tourism is also a major commercial focus of the street, and designer shops have gradually replaced many small bookshops. The northern part of the boulevard is now the most frequented, due to its bookstores (such as Gibert Joseph and the Gibert Jeune), cafes, cinema and clothes shops.

The main buildings of the boulevard are the Musée de Cluny, the Lycée Saint-Louis, the École des Mines and the university facilities of the Sorbonne.

== History ==
The Boulevard Saint-Michel was the other important part of Haussmann's renovation of Paris on the Left Bank along with the creation of the Boulevard Saint-Germain. It was formerly approximated by the Rue de la Harpe, which for centuries led from the Seine to the Porte Saint-Michel, a gate to the walls of Paris near what is now the intersection of the Boulevard Saint-Michel and the Rue Monsieur le Prince. Construction of the boulevard was decreed in 1855 and began in 1860.

The boulevard was initially known as the Boulevard de Sébastopol Rive Gauche, but was changed to the Boulevard Saint-Michel in 1867. The name is derived from the eponymous gate destroyed in 1679 and the subsequent Saint-Michel market in the same area (the current Place Edmond Rostand).

Numerous streets disappeared as a result of the boulevard's creation, including the Rue des Deux Portes Saint-André, the Passage d'Harcourt, the Rue de Mâcon, the Rue Neuve de Richelieu, the Rue Poupée, part of Rue de la Harpe and of Rue d'Enfer, part of the former Place Saint-Michel and the Rue de l'Est. The part of the Boulevard Saint-Michel at the entrance of the Rue Henri Barbusse and the Rue de l'Abbé de l'Epée was previously known as the Place Louis Marin.

During 1871, the Hôtel des Etrangers was the meeting place of the Vilains Bonhommes (renamed Circle Zutique by Charles Cros) which included Paul Verlaine and Arthur Rimbaud.

Jules Vallès, socialist writer and survivor of the Paris Commune, was buried in the cemetery of Père-Lachaise. His body was carried there from the funeral home at n° 77, into which 10,000 people are claimed to have squeezed.

On 10 December 1934, the founders of the Comité de rédaction du traité d’analyse met at the Café A. Capoulade, n° 63, to discuss writing a textbook on mathematical analysis. This meeting included Henri Cartan, Claude Chevalley, Jean Delsarte, Jean Dieudonné, René de Possel and André Weil. They were, together with others, to become famous in mathematical circles as the Bourbaki Group.

== Access ==
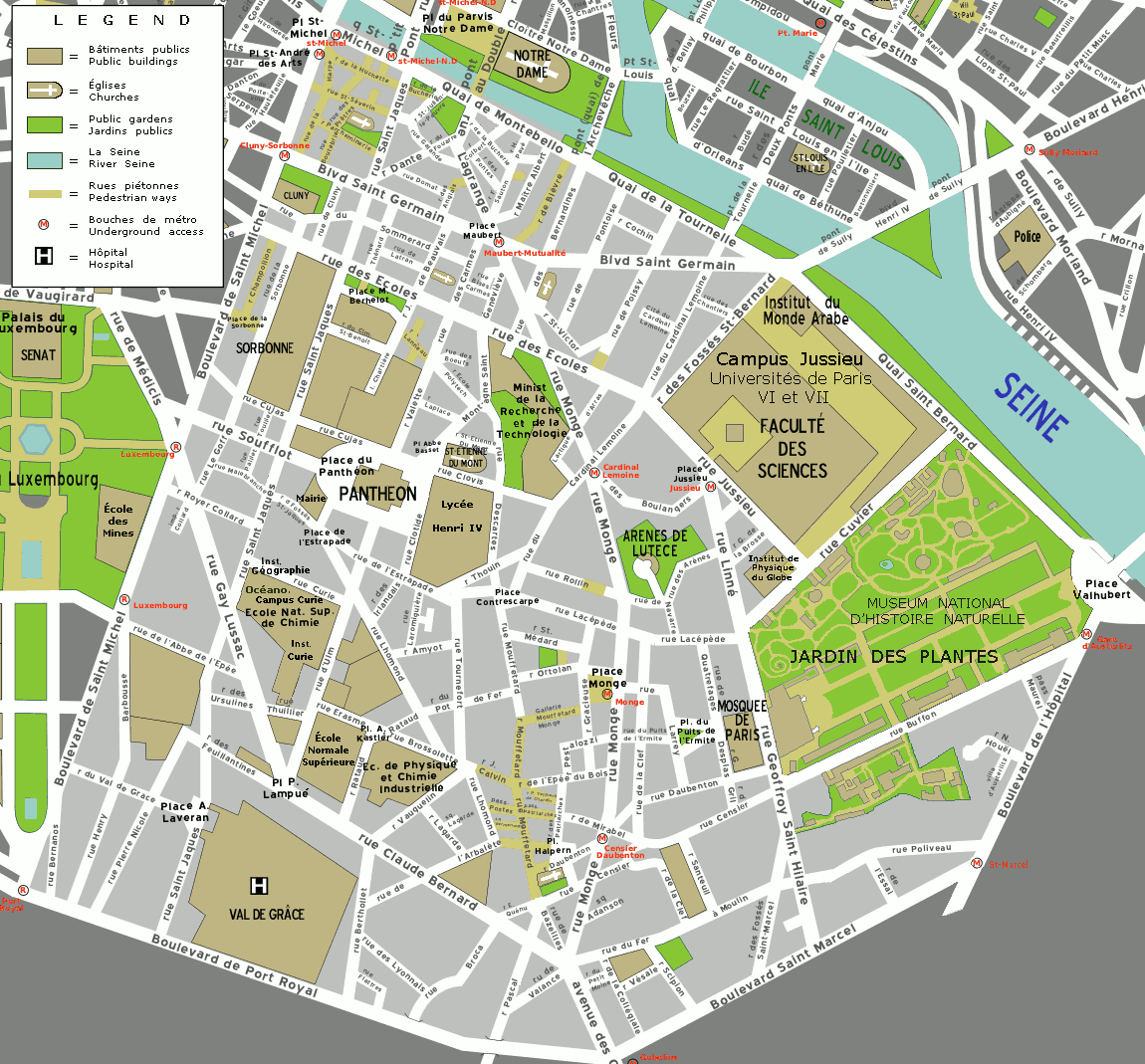
Map of the 5th arrondissement of Paris showing the Boulevard Saint-Michel (on the left)

The closest metro stations are:

- Saint-Michel at the northern end in the Place Saint-Michel.
- Cluny/La Sorbonne at the intersection with the Boulevard Saint-Germain.
- Luxembourg on the Place Edmond Rostand (at the intersection with the Rue Gay-Lussac).
- Port-Royal near the southern end (across the Place Camille Jullian).

== Properties ==
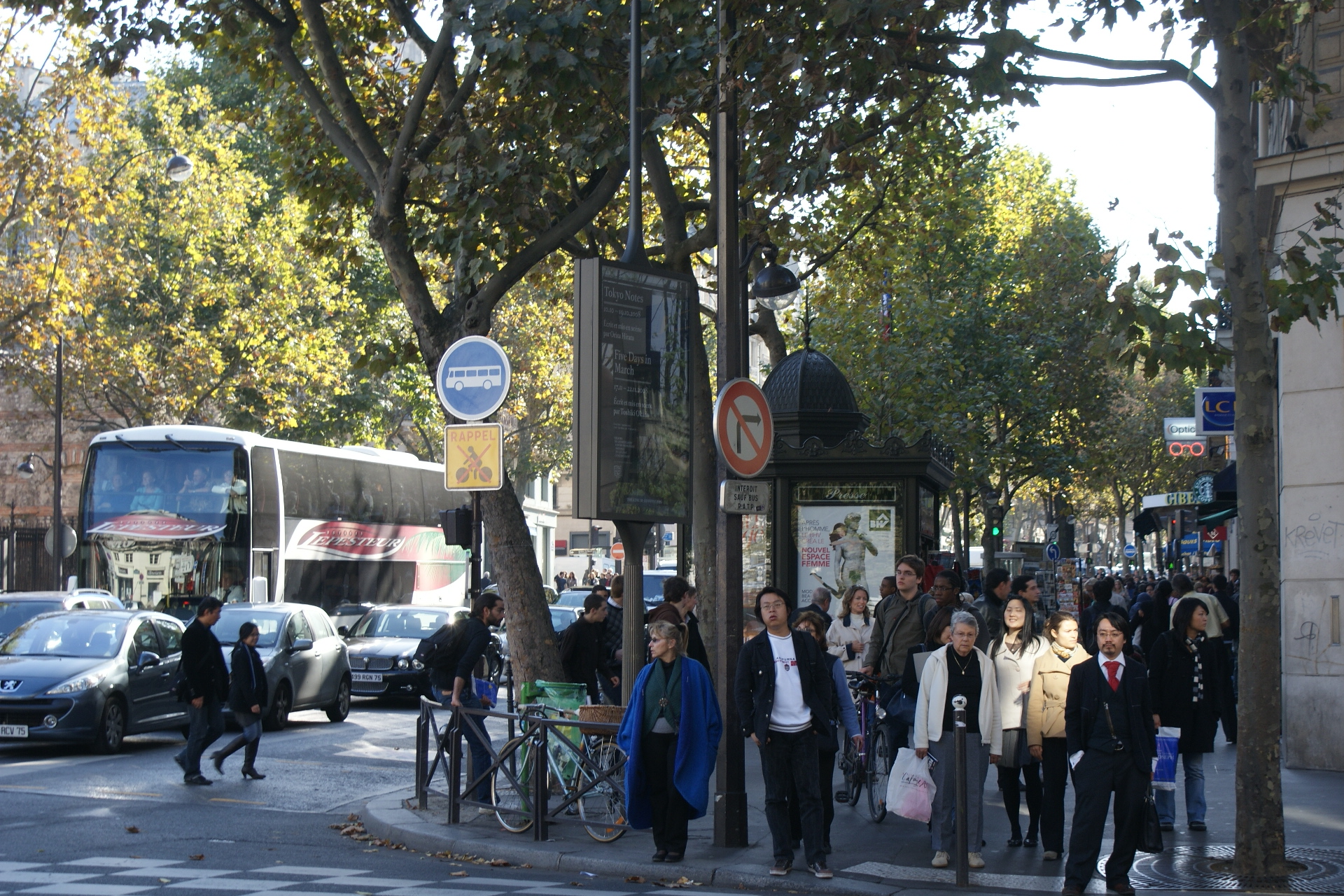
Boulevard Saint-Michel near Musée de Cluny

- n° 23b: On the corner with the Boulevard Saint-Germain is the Musée de Cluny (Musée National du Moyen Âge) which is made up of two listed monuments: the Palais des Thermes which are ruins of Roman baths, and the Hôtel de Cluny, a medieval and renaissance residence Official website, in English.
- n° 24: The pipe shop, Au Caïd, has been on this corner (with the Rue Pierre Sarrazin) since 1878.
- n° 27: On the corner with the Rue des Ecoles was the Café Vachette, frequented by Catulle Mendès, Joris-Karl Huysmans and Stéphane Mallarmé.
- n° 30: On the corner with the Rue Racine in 1871 was the Hôtel des Etrangers, nowadays Hôtel Belloy Saint Germain.
- n° 37: André Weil and his younger sister Simone moved in January 1914 to a new family home in an apartment in this building. After the war, they returned here in 1919.
- n° 40-42: The café Sherry Cobbler, frequented by Mallarmé, the humourist Alphonse Allais, Auguste Villiers de l'Isle-Adam ...
- n° 44: Lycée Saint-Louis
- n° 49: For over 70 years, from 1920 onwards, this was the PUF (Presses universitaires de France) bookshop;
- n° 52: In 1885, Monsieur Lebas, the editor of Rodolphe Darzens (minor symbolist poet, biographer of Arthur Rimbaud, correspondent of Stéphane Mallarmé) lived here.
- n° 54: Offices of SMEREP (Société Mutualiste des Étudiants de la Région parisienne) the student Social Security organisation.
- n° 60: Ecole des Mines
- n° 63: At the end of the 19th century this was the location of the Taverne du Panthéon, where associates such as Pierre Louÿs and Henry Bataille of the literary magazine Mercure de France dined. By 1934, it had become the Café A. Capoulade.
- n° 64: From 1873 to 1894 this was the home of Parnassian poet and Academician Charles-Marie-René Leconte de Lisle and bears a 1934 plaque in his memory. The poet Auguste Lacaussade also lived here.
- n° 68: Headquarters of the IUATLD (International Union Against TB and Lung Disease).
- n° 71: Well-known Jazz club Le Petit Journal.
- n° 73: On the corner of the Rue Royer-Collard was Galerie de la Pléiade, an art gallery whose primary focus was photography, founded by Jacques Schiffrin in the spring of 1931.
- n° 74: On 7 April 1987 the Algerian lawyer Me Ali Mecili, an opponent of the Algerian government, was assassinated here.
- n° 79: Was the headquarters of the Committee for the Protection of Juvenile Russian Students Outside of Russia founded in 1923, and chaired by Michael Feodorov. The same building also housed the National Russian Committee chaired by.
- n° 103: Center for French Universities, professional organisations of the academic community in France.
- n° 111: Egyptian cultural centre.
- n° 125: From February 1890 Paul Verlaine resided here at the hôtel des Mines.
- n° 131: Headquarters of EHESS (Editions De L'école Des Hautes Etudes En Sciences Sociales).

== Literature ==
- Mentioned in the poem ("Párisban járt az ősz", "Autumn appeared in Paris") of the Hungarian poet Endre Ady, 1906
- Mentioned in Of Human Bondage, Chapter 44 by W. Somerset Maugham, 1915
- Mentioned in "Noctambule", Ballads of a Bohemian by Robert Service, 1921
- Mentioned in "Ulysses" chapter 3 by James Joyce, 1922
- Mentioned in "The Sun Also Rises" by Ernest Hemingway, 1926
- Mentioned in "How it Feels to Be Colored Me" by Zora Neale Hurston, 1928
- Mentioned in "Nightwood" by Djuna Barnes, 1936
- Illustrated in "Madeline's Rescue" by Ludwig Bemelmans, 1951
- Mentioned in "68 Boulevard Saint-Michel" by Danielle Martinigol and Alain Grousset, 1999

== Music ==
- Mentioned in "Where Do You Go to (My Lovely)" by Peter Sarstedt, 1969
- Mentioned in "Jessica" by Harpo, 1976
- Mentioned in "Parisienne Walkways" by Gary Moore, 1979
- Mentioned in "Look Down" in Les Misérables

== Extension to the sea ==
A political candidate named Duconnaud famously proposed, as an electoral promise, to "extend the Boulevard Saint-Michel to the sea." The idea was taken up by Ferdinand Lop who, responding to the question of how to know at which end it would be extended, answered with panache: "It will be extended to the sea at both ends". This is the version given by Alphonse Allais.
