= 5th arrondissement of Paris =

Municipal arrondissement in Île-de-France, France

- Municipal arrondissement
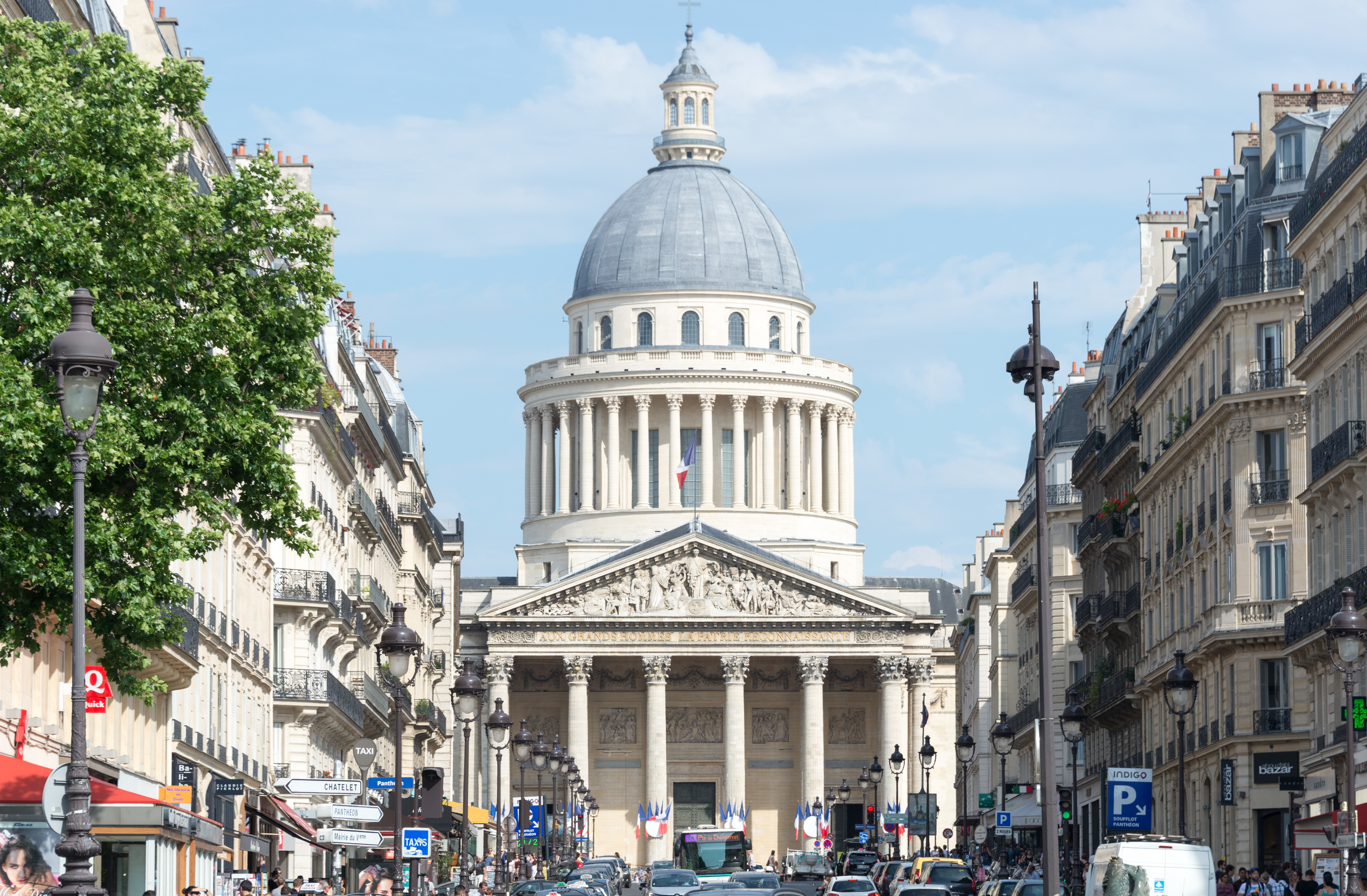
- A view of Rue Soufflot from the west with the Panthéon in the background

- Coat of arms

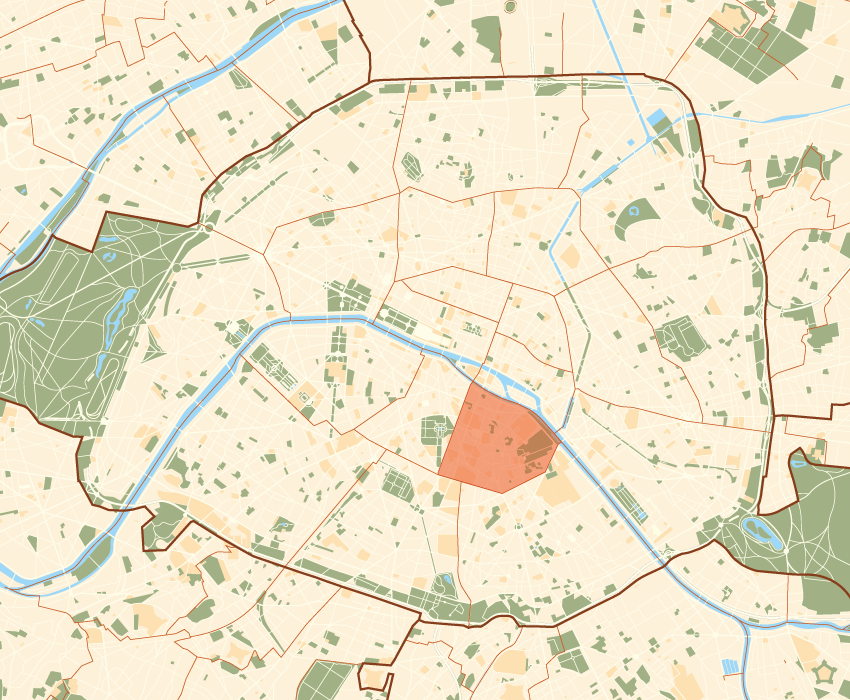
- Location within Paris
- Coordinates: 48°50′50″N 2°20′40″E
- Country: France
- Region: Île-de-France
- Department: Paris
- Commune: Paris

Government
  - Mayor (2020–2026): Florence Berthout (SL)
- Area: 2.54 km^{2} (0.98 sq mi)
- Population (2023): 55,252
  - Density: 21,800/km^{2} (56,300/sq mi)
- INSEE code: 75105

The 5th arrondissement of Paris (V^{e} arrondissement) is one of the 20 arrondissements of Paris, the capital city of France. In spoken French, this arrondissement is referred to as le cinquième. In 2023, it had a population of 55,252.

The arrondissement, also known as Panthéon, is situated on the Rive Gauche of the River Seine. It is one of the capital's central arrondissements. The arrondissement is notable for being the location of the Latin Quarter, a district dominated by universities, colleges, and prestigious high schools since the 12th century when the University of Paris was created. It is also home to the National Museum of Natural History and Jardin des plantes in its eastern part.

The 5th arrondissement is also one of the oldest districts of the city, dating back to ancient times. Traces of the area's past survive in such sites as the Arènes de Lutèce, a Roman amphitheatre, as well as the Thermes de Cluny, a Roman thermae.

== Geography ==
The 5th arrondissement covers some 2.541 km^{2} (0.981 sq. miles, or 628 acres) in central Paris.

== Demography ==
The population of the arrondissement peaked in 1911 when the population density reached almost 50,000 inhabitants per km^{2}. In 2009, 48,909 worked in the arrondissement.

=== Historical population ===
Historical population

Year	Pop.	±% p.a.
1861	107,754	—
1872	96,689	−0.98%
1881	115,675	+2.01%
1891	117,549	+0.16%
1901	119,198	+0.14%
1911	121,378	+0.18%
1921	121,242	−0.01%
1931	117,770	−0.29%
1936	107,120	−1.88%
1946	102,608	−0.43%
1954	106,443	+0.46%

Year	Pop.	±% p.a.
1962	96,031	−1.28%
1968	83,721	−2.26%
1975	67,668	−3.00%
1982	62,173	−1.20%
1990	61,222	−0.19%
1999	58,849	−0.44%
2007	62,664	+0.79%
2012	60,179	−0.81%
2017	58,850	−0.45%
2023	55,252	−1.05%

Source: Demographia (1861-1999) and INSEE (1876-2023)

=== Immigration ===
Place of birth of residents of the 5th arrondissement in 1999
Born in metropolitan France	Born outside metropolitan France			
80.0%	20.0%			
80.0%	Born in overseas France	Born in foreign countries with French citizenship at birth^{1}	EU-15 immigrants^{2}	Non-EU-15 immigrants
80.0%	0.8%	4.5%	5.4%	9.3%
^{1} This group is made up largely of former French settlers, such as pieds-noirs in Northwest Africa, followed by former colonial citizens who had French citizenship at birth (such as was often the case for the native elite in French colonies), as well as to a lesser extent foreign-born children of French expatriates. A foreign country is understood as a country not part of France in 1999, so a person born for example in 1950 in Algeria, when Algeria was an integral part of France, is nonetheless listed as a person born in a foreign country in French statistics.^{2} An immigrant is a person born in a foreign country not having French citizenship at birth. An immigrant may have acquired French citizenship since moving to France, but is still considered an immigrant in French statistics. On the other hand, persons born in France with foreign citizenship (the children of immigrants) are not listed as immigrants.

== History ==
The V^{e} arrondissement is the oldest arrondissement in Paris, and was first built by the Romans. Rue Saint-Jacques was the main road through Lutetia.

The construction of the Roman town Lutetia dates back to the 1st century BC, which was built after the conquest of the Gaulish site, situated on the île de la Cité, by the Romans.

Saint-Hilaire is a ruined 12th-century church in Paris, active until the French Revolution.

== Government and business offices ==
The Ministry of Higher Education and Research has its head office in the arrondissement.

Sony Computer Science Laboratories (ソニーコンピュータサイエンス研究所) Paris is located in the arrondissement, and the Bureau d'Enquêtes sur les Événements de Mer (BEAmer) at one time had its head office there.

== Maps ==
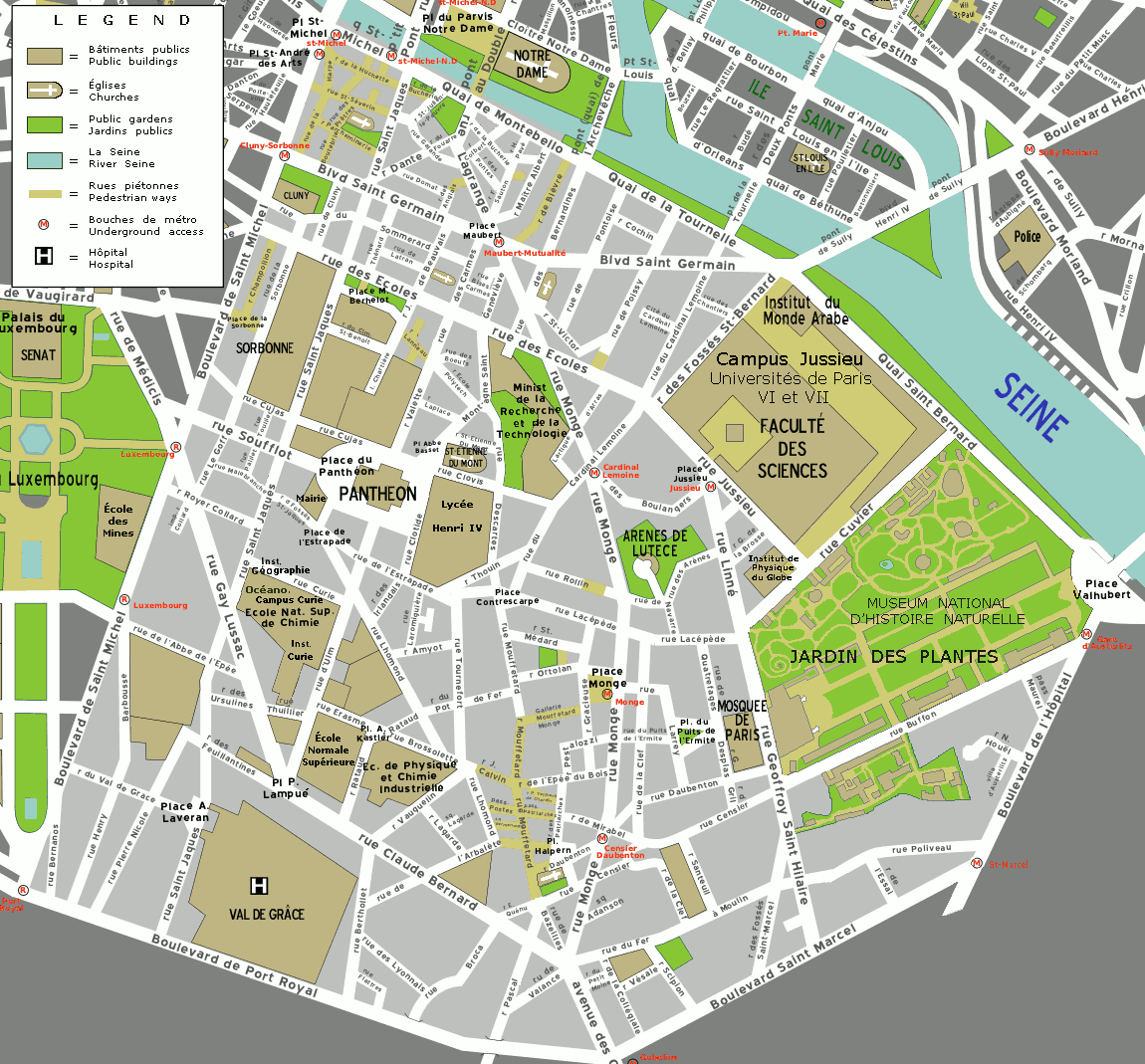
Map of the 5th arrondissement

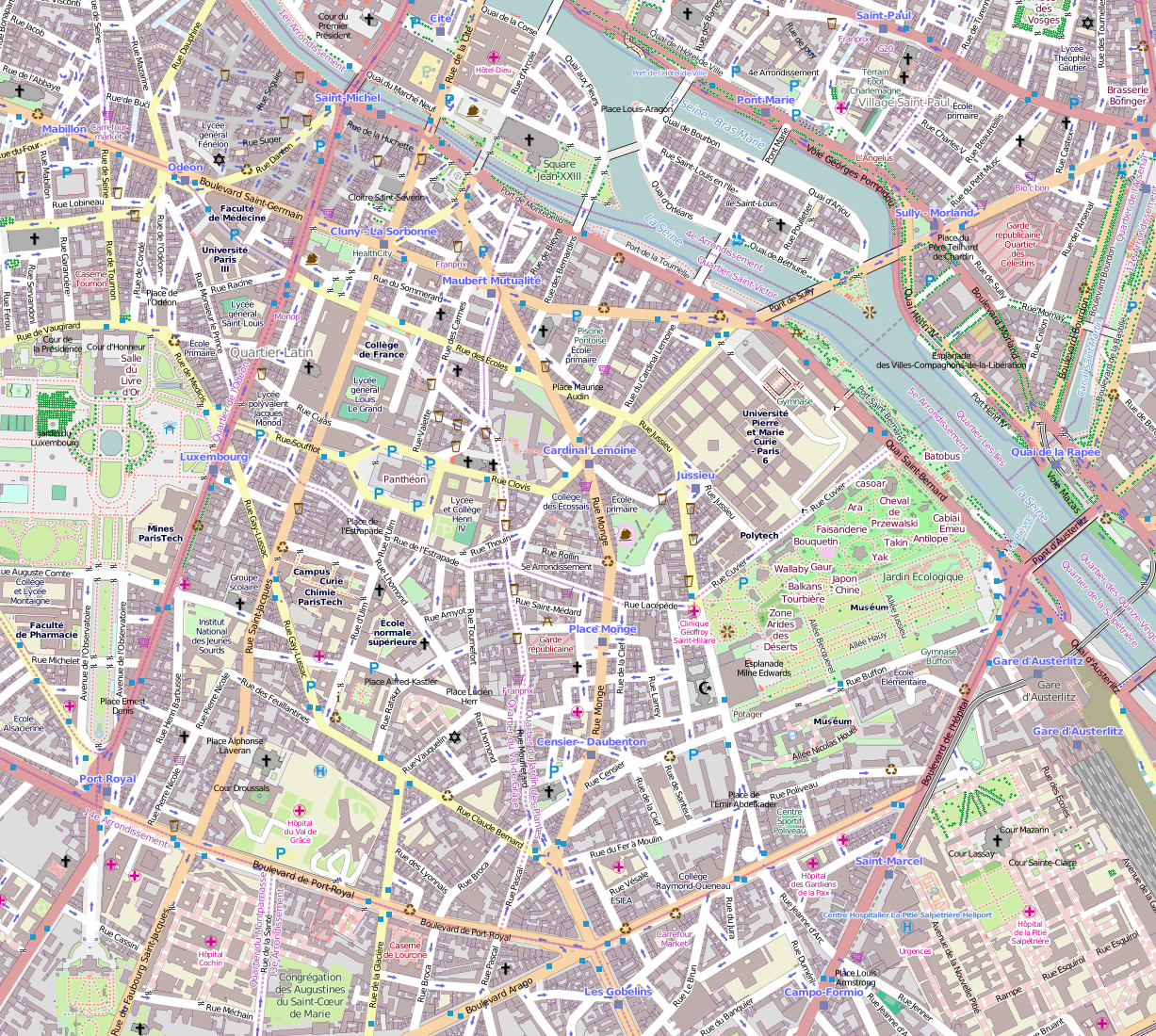
The 5th arrondissement in OpenStreetMap

Neighborhoods of the 5th arrondissement

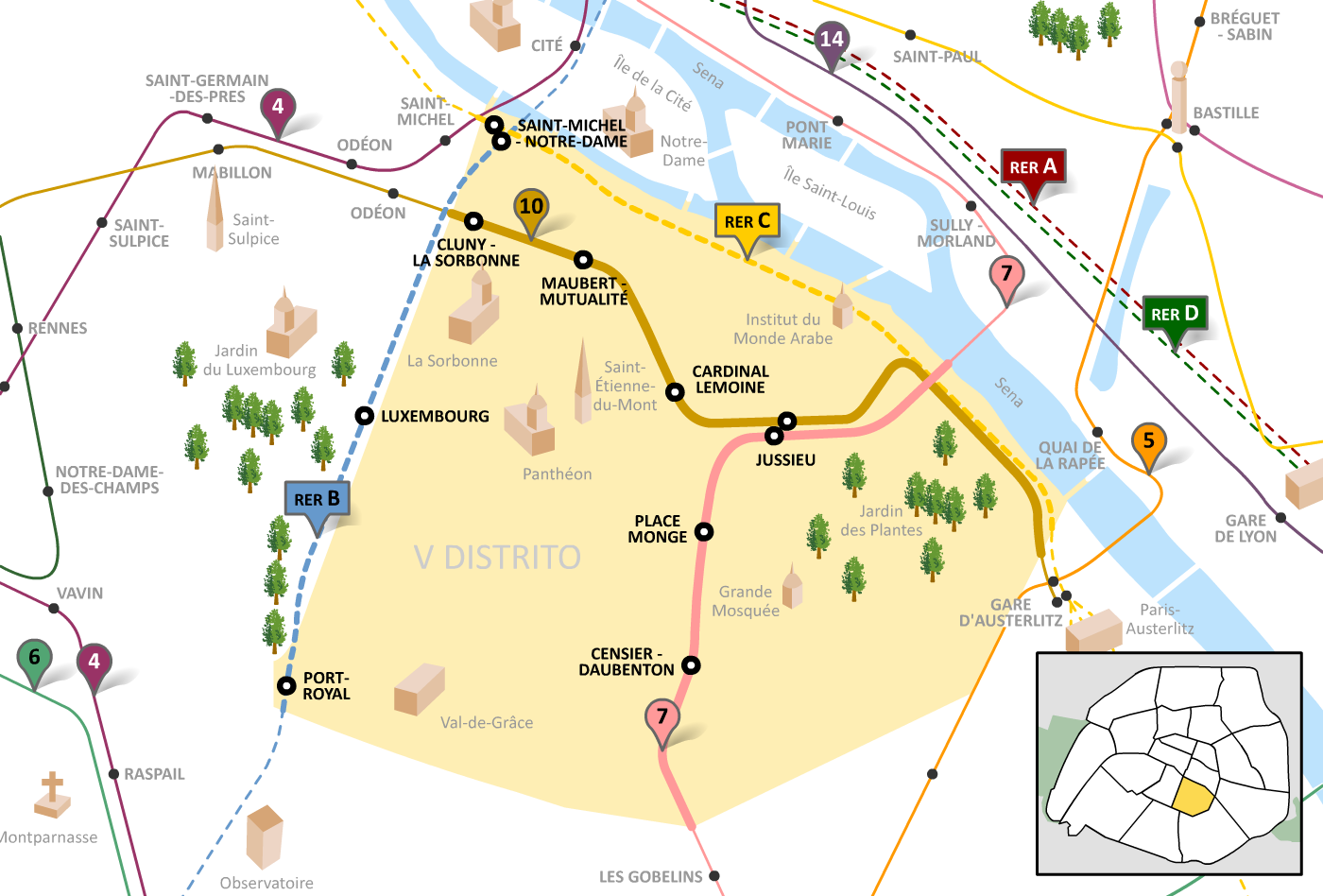
Metro map of the 5th arrondissement

== Cityscape ==
=== Quarters ===
The quarters of the 5th arrondissement

- Quartier Saint-Victor (17)
- Quartier Jardin-des-Plantes (18)
- Quartier Val-de-Grâce (19)
- Quartier Sorbonne (20)

=== Places of interest ===
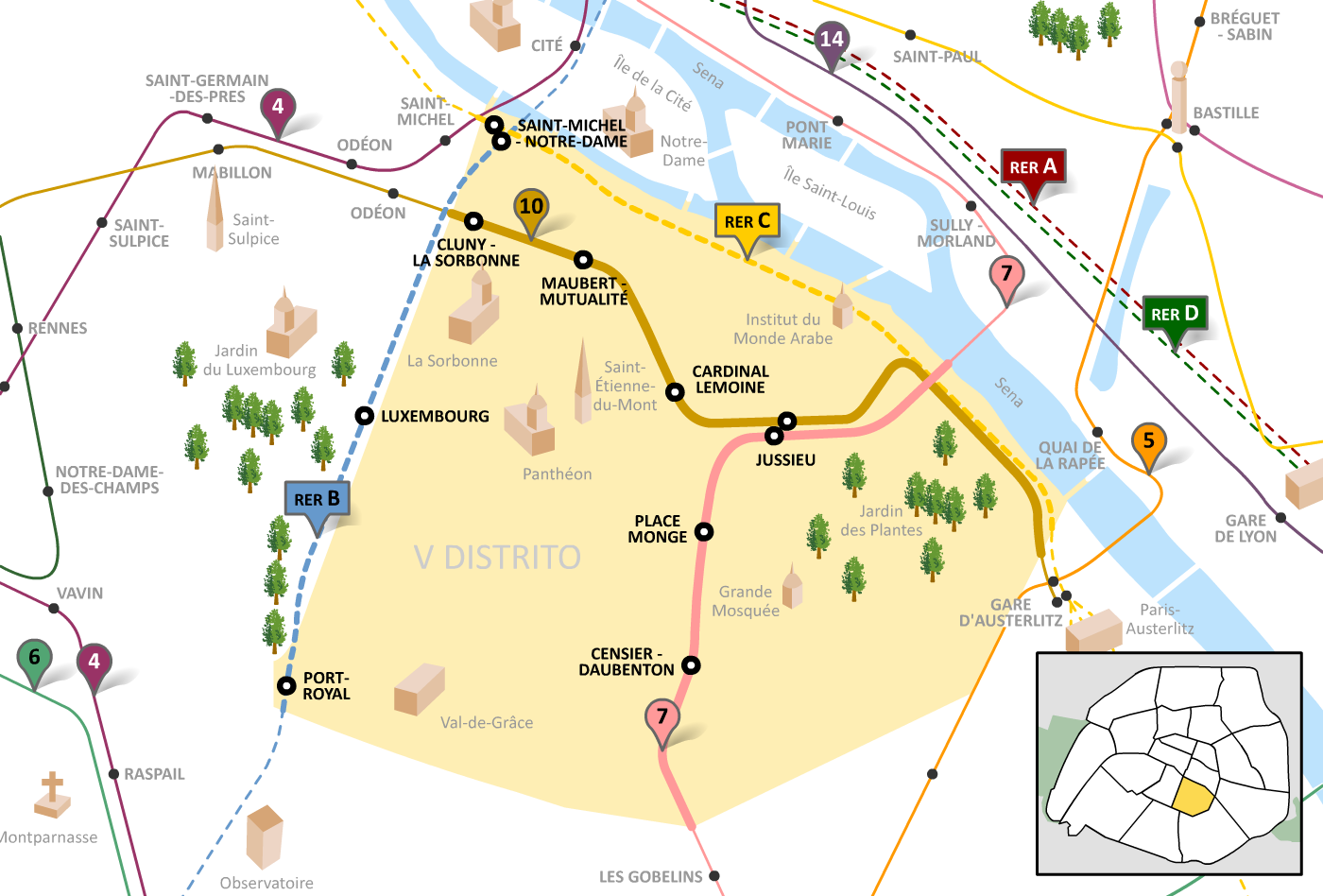

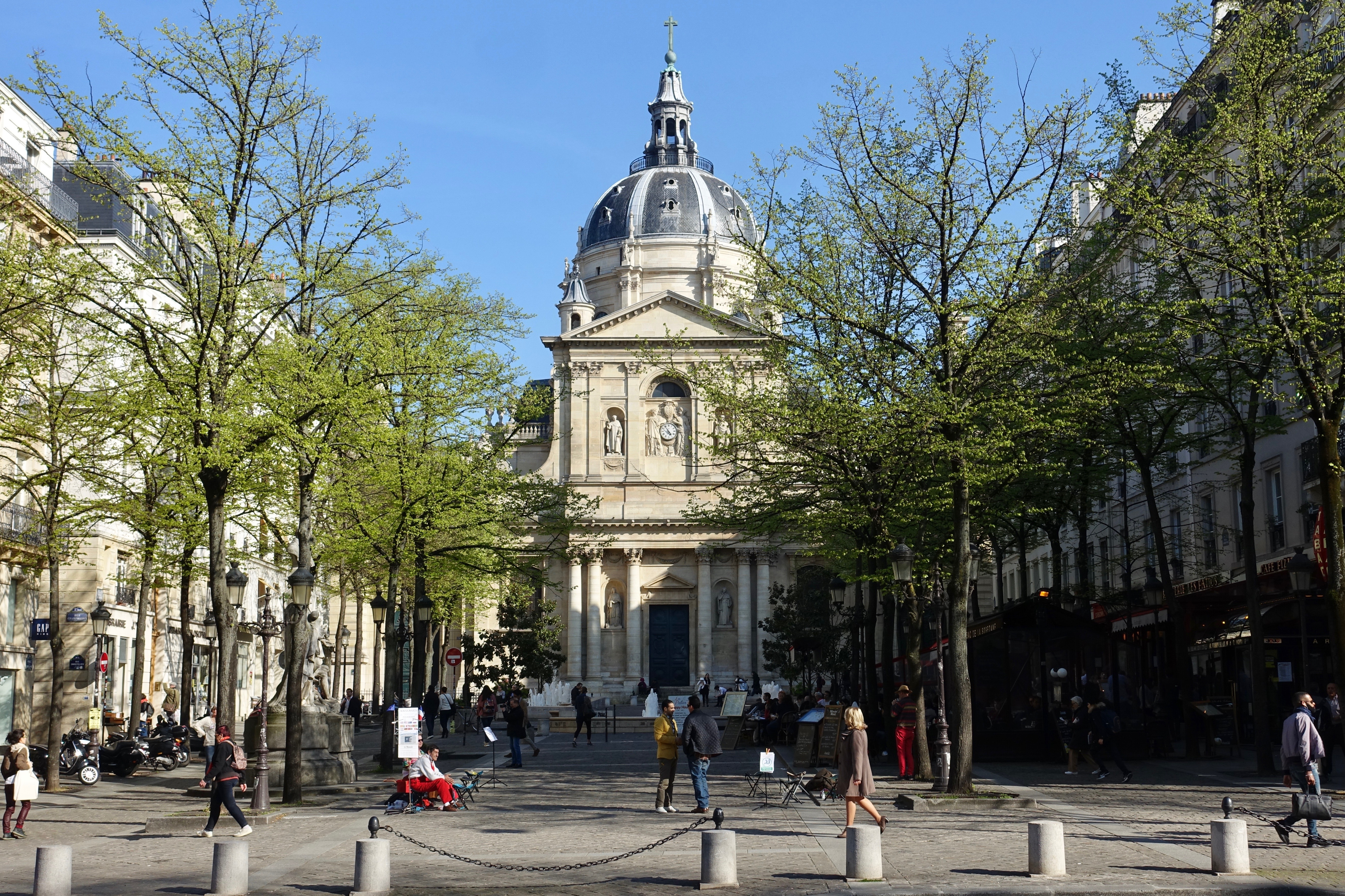
Sorbonne university campus.

- Arènes de Lutèce
- Centre de la Mer et des Eaux
- Fontaine Saint-Michel
- Institut du Monde Arabe (Arab World Institute)
- Jardin des Plantes and the Musée National d'Histoire Naturelle
- Latin Quarter
- Maison de la Mutualité
- Montagne Sainte-Geneviève
- Musée de Cluny, hosting the Thermes de Cluny
- Musée de l'Assistance Publique - Hôpitaux de Paris
- Musée Curie
- Musée des Collections Historiques de la Préfecture de Police
- Musée de la Sculpture en Plein Air
- The Panthéon
- Sainte-Geneviève Library
- Val-de-Grâce military hospital

=== Religious buildings ===
- Church of Val de Grâce
- Saint-Ephrem church
- Notre-Dame-du-Liban church
- Saint-Étienne-du-Mont church
- Saint-Jacques-du-Haut-Pas church
- Saint-Jean-l'Evangéliste church
- Saint-Julien-le-Pauvre church
- Saint-Medard, Paris church
- Saint-Nicolas-du-Chardonnet church
- Saint-Séverin church
- La Grande Mosquée (Great Mosque of Paris), created in 1922 after World War I, as a sign of recognition from the nation to the fallen Muslim tirailleurs who died at Verdun (and in the take-back of Douaumont fort)

=== Colleges and universities ===
As part of the Latin Quarter, the 5th arrondissement is known for its high concentration of educational and research establishments.

- Collège de France
- Collège international de philosophie
- École Polytechnique (historical campus; the school has now been relocated)
- PSL University
  - École Normale Supérieure
  - ENSCP - Chimie Paris
  - ESPCI Paris
- Sorbonne University - Faculté des sciences
  - Jussieu Campus
- Université Paris Cité
  - Faculté de médecine de Paris Centre
  - Institut de Physique du Globe de Paris
- Sorbonne
  - Sorbonne University - Faculté des Lettres
  - University of Paris I Panthéon-Sorbonne
  - University of Paris III Sorbonne Nouvelle
  - Rectorate of Paris
- Famous lycées with preparatory classes to the Grandes écoles
  - Lycée Louis-le-Grand
  - Lycée Henri IV

=== Main streets and squares ===
- Rue des Anglais
- Rue de l'Arbalète
- Rue des Arènes
- Square des Arènes de Lutèce
- Rue des Bernardins
- Rue Boutebrie
- Rue Buffon
- Rue du Cardinal-Lemoine
- Rue des Carmes
- Rue Censier
- Rue Claude Bernard
- Rue de la Clef
- Rue Clovis
- Place de la Contrescarpe
- Rue Cujas
- Rue Cuvier
- Rue Dante
- Rue Descartes

- Rue des Écoles
- Rue de l'Estrapade
- Rue des Fossés-Saint-Bernard
- Rue des Fossés-Saint-Jacques
- Avenue des Gobelins
- Rue Gay-Lussac
- Rue Geoffroy Saint-Hilaire
- Rue de la Harpe
- Rue de la Huchette
- Place Jussieu
- Rue Jussieu
- Rue Lacépède
- Rue Lagrange
- Rue Lhomond
- Rue Linné
- Rue Le Goff
- Rue Malebranche
- Rue Monge
- Rue de la Montagne Sainte-Geneviève

- Rue Mouffetard
- Place du Panthéon
- Rue Poliveau
- Rue des Prêtres-Saint-Séverin
- Square René Viviani
- Boulevard Saint-Germain
- Rue Saint-Jacques
- Boulevard Saint-Michel
- Rue Saint-Séverin
- Rue de la Sorbonne
- Rue Soufflot
- Rue Thouin
- Rue Tournefort
- Rue d'Ulm
- Rue Valette
- Rue Xavier Privas
