= Anti-Black Box Curriculum Movement =

2015 Taiwan student protest movement

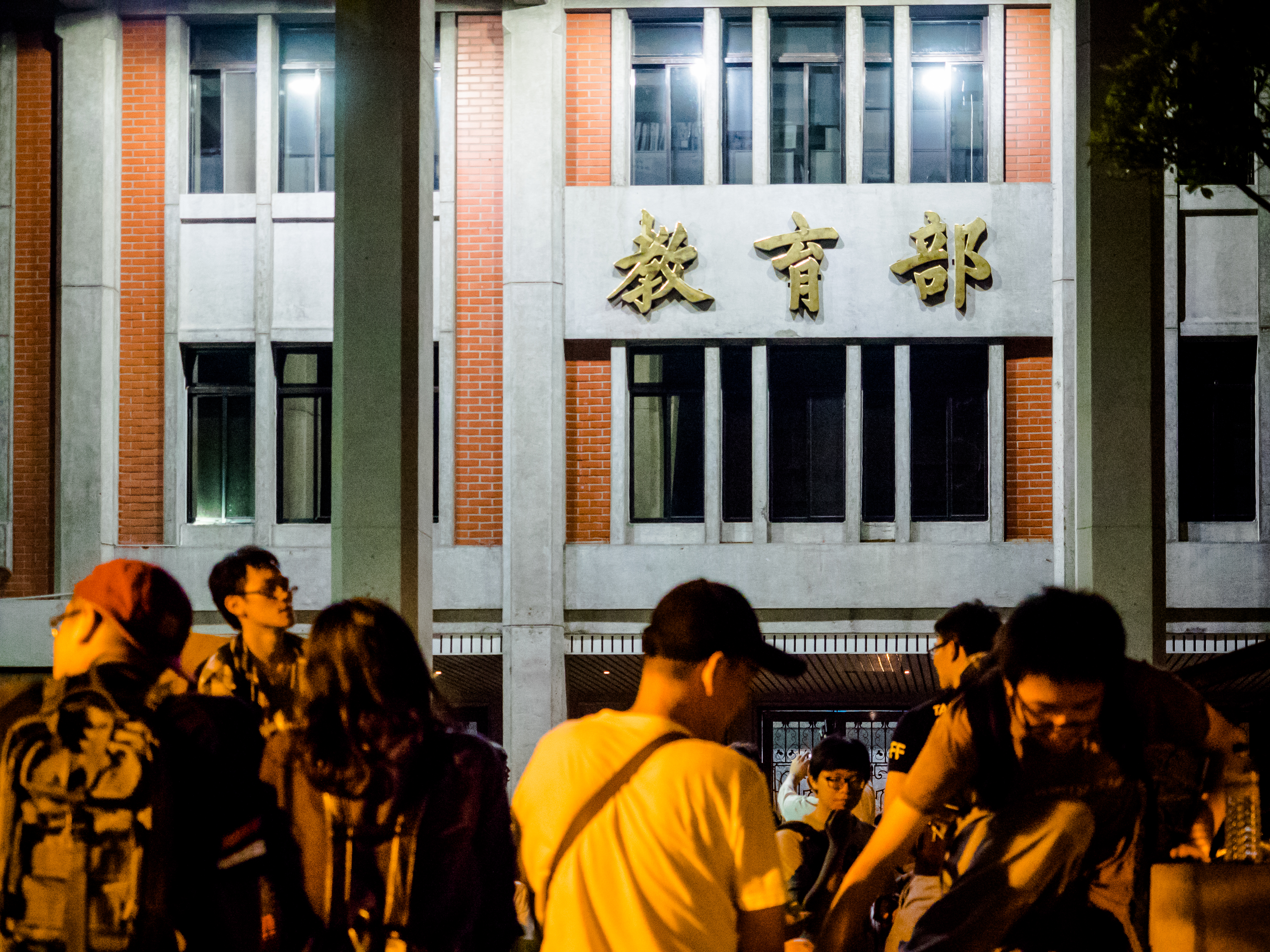
- The Ministry of Education building surrounded
- Date: 2015-05-24 to 2015-08-06
- Location: Taipei, Taiwan
- Caused by: 2012 changes in high school (zh)
- Goals: Withdraw curriculum guidelines adjustment
- Methods: Demonstrations; Sit-ins; Online activism
- Status: Adjustment withdrawn on 31 May 2016
- Result: Ended in success

Parties
| Protesters | Government |

Lead figures
| 朱震; 林冠華; 王品蓁; 游騰傑; 廖崇倫 | Wu Se-hwa; 張奇文 |

Anti-Black Box Curriculum Movement
- Traditional Chinese: 反黑箱課綱運動
- Simplified Chinese: 反黑箱课纲运动
Transcriptions
Standard Mandarin
- Hanyu Pinyin: Fǎn Hēixiāng Kègāng Yùndòng
Southern Min
- Hokkien POJ: Hoán Hek-siuⁿ Khò-kong Ūn-tōng

The Anti-Black Box Curriculum Movement was a 2015 Taiwanese student protest, against certain proposed senior high school curriculum changes. "Black box" is a reference to the students' concerns about the lack of transparency of the proposed changes. On 23 July 2015, the protesters stormed the Ministry of Education.

== Protested changes ==
The proposed changes to the high school history curriculum were to

- social studies, including the mention in textbooks of Japanese war crimes during their occupation of Taiwan and the acknowledgement of comfort women sex-slavery in Asia;
- Chinese literature selections.

Students also protested what they felt was too much rote memorization through Buxiban cramming in the educational system (part of the buke practice of intensive extracurricular preparation for high school admissions tests), as well as perceived corruption and illegal connections between politicians. Taiwanese voters have demanded that opposing political parties, e.g. KMT versus DPP, act with integrity so as to put a check on each other.

== Outcome ==
The student protest movement was successful. On 22 May 2016, Minister of Education Pan Wen-Chung announced that the curriculum changes would not be implemented. He also stated that certain proposed to changes to national high school curriculum would be delayed until 2020.

== See also ==
- List of protests in the 21st century
