= Chinese school (disambiguation) =

A Chinese school is a school outside China teaching Chinese language and culture.

Chinese school may also refer to:

- Education in China
- an institute teaching Chinese as a foreign language

== See also ==
- Confucius Institute, partnerships between colleges and universities in China and those in other countries
- Bǔ kè, the social phenomenon of extra study in China
  - Buxiban, cram schools in China
