= Khâgne =

Two-year academic program in the French "post-bac" system

Khâgne (French pronunciation: [kaɲ]), officially known as classes préparatoires littéraires ([klas pʁepaʁatwaʁ liteʁɛʁ]), is a two-year academic program in the French “post-bac” (≈undergraduate) system, with a specialization in the humanities (A/L) or social science (B/L). It is one of the three main types of Classe préparatoire aux grandes écoles (CPGE, informally classe prépa), contrasting with other CPGE majors such as Maths Sup in mathematics and engineering, or Prépa HEC in the business domain.

Strictly speaking, the word khâgne refers to the final year of that program. In fact, the course articulates into two years with separate names:

- year 1: officially Lettres Supérieures, casually hypokhâgne
- year 2 (+3 +4): officially Première Supérieure, casually khâgne

The two-year program as a whole is commonly called hypokhâgne-khâgne [ipokaɲˈkaɲ], or simply khâgne.

In 2020, about 130 lycées scattered across France offered hypokhâgne classes (1st year), and at least 30 had a khâgne (2nd year). Historically famous institutions for preparing the khâgne program – some since the 19th century – include prestigious lycées in Paris (lycées Henri IV, Louis-le-Grand, Condorcet, Fénelon, Janson-de-Sailly…), around Paris (Lycée Lakanal in Sceaux, Lycée La Bruyère in Versailles, …) and in major cities of the country (e.g. Lycée du Parc in Lyon, Lycée Montaigne in Bordeaux…).

== Main features of the khâgne program ==
Once they have graduated from secondary school (baccalauréat), French students with a strong interest in the Humanities may choose to follow a Licence curriculum in a university (l'université, slang la fac); or they may opt for the more selective khâgne course, which is situated outside the university system, taking place in a lycée just like secondary school.

One of the formal differences between the two competing systems (university vs. khâgne) is that, while university students discover a new form of academic organization (with typically large gatherings of students in lecture halls), khâgne students continue the organization they were familiar with in high schools (lycée), characterized by a stable class group with a maximum of 35 to 40 members. This is conducive to more substantial interaction between students and their professors, which is commonly understood as favouring high-quality learning.

When the khâgne program is based in a public school, the tuition fee normally ranges between 0 and 300 euros per year; private schools require higher fees. The most prestigious khâgne programs in France are found in public schools, and are thus essentially free of charge.

The official objective of khâgne is to prepare undergraduate students for the competitive entrance examination (le Concours) to the three Écoles normales supérieures (ENS) — more specifically to their Humanities and Social science departments (Section Lettres, Section Lettres et sciences humaines).

In case of an unsuccessful attempt at Concours at the end of their khâgne, students are allowed to repeat that second year once or even twice. This means that students can remain in the whole programme from two up to four years in total (see also the section on slang terms).

For the vast majority of students who will fail to get selected to ENS, having merely attended a khâgne curriculum remains valued per se on the job market, even though it provides no formal degree.

== Current organisation of the khâgne program ==
There are two kinds of hypokhâgnes:

1) The hypokhâgne A/L which can either lead to a Khâgne Ulm or a Khâgne Lyon.

2) The hypokhâgne B/L which leads to the Khâgne B/L only.

There are therefore three kinds of khâgnes: khâgne B/L, khâgne Ulm, and khâgne Lyon, respectively preparing to the following entrance exams:

- The entrance examination (A/L section) to the ENS Ulm
- The entrance examination (A/L section) to the ENS of Lyon.
- The entrance examination (B/L section) to the ENS Ulm, the ENS of Lyon and the ENS Paris-Saclay

=== Khâgnes de Lettres (Ulm and Lyon) ===
The two remaining kinds of khâgnes are literary khâgnes: khâgne Lyon and khâgne Ulm.

- Khâgne Ulm prepares to the A/L section of the entrance examination to the ENS of Paris. As the khâgne B/L, the particularity of the khâgne A/L lies in the fact that curricula of some subjects is unlimited. Each subject of the entrance examination must be taken in a written and in an oral form. The six written subjects taken are given the same coefficient: a codified essay in French literature, in history and in philosophy, a translation from an ancient language, a translation from a modern language and a commentary of it, and a subject taken as a speciality. During the oral entrance examination, the literary analysis of a French literary text, an examination in philosophy, in modern and in ancient languages are based on an unlimited programme, and so is the extension of the curriculum in history. However the examination in the subject taken as a speciality is based on an explicit curriculum. About 2,000 students attend the khâgne ulm.
- Khâgne Lyon. It prepares to the ENS of Lyon, which is more recent than the ENS Ulm, though it is better ranked in some research departments such as in exact and experimental sciences.

Each subject taught is based on an explicit curriculum which is different each year. Although all subjects have the same importance for the written part of the exam, for the oral examination one or two subjects are strongly emphasized, which makes the entrance examination to the ENS of Lyon more specialized than the one of to the ENS Ulm. 3,000 students are attending the khâgne Lyon each year.

For the students of Khâgne Lyon who choose to specialise in English, there is also the possibility of getting into the ENS Paris-Saclay, traditionally a more science-orientated ENS but with an additional 10 places offered to English specialists. The selection process involves a different emphasis put on the grades obtained in the exam for the ENS Lyon and an even more specialised oral exam, which only involves English-related subjects.

Unlike what is commonly assumed, the distinction between "classical" and "modern" opposing the khâgne Ulm to the khâgne Lyon isn't explained by the distinction between classical literature and modern literature, since classical literature is also taught in khâgne Lyon and modern literature in khâgne Ulm. The distinction is actually made between "classical curriculum" and "modern classical" drawn in 1902 by the Ministry of Public Instruction of the time, Alexandre Ribot. Before 1902, all high school classes were considered "classical", which means that ancient languages were compulsory even among students majoring in sciences. The reform created "modern" sections in which ancient languages weren't compulsory.

==== The hypokhâgne A/L curriculum ====
All hypokhâgneux must attend 5 hours of French literature, 5 hours of history, 4 hours of philosophy, 4 hours of the first modern language, 3 hours of ancient language and cultures (2 hours of Latin or Ancient Greek and 2 hours of antique culture), 2 hours of geography and 2 hours of a second modern language a week. Then comes a chosen subject which can be art, ancient languages, geography or another modern language. In khâgne, the compulsory subjects and their respective tuition hours depend on the kind of speciality chosen:

- in literature, in philosophy, in history/geography or in geography (explicit curriculum)
- in classical literature (Latin and ancient Greek, ancient history)
- in modern languages (two modern languages are to be studied)
- in arts : musicology, art history, cinematography or theater studies

=== Khâgnes de Lettres et Sciences sociales (B/L) ===
Compared to the khâgne A/L, students of the khâgne de Lettres et Sciences sociales (B/L) (Literature and social sciences) are required to take mathematics and social sciences in addition to literary subjects (philosophy, French literature, history and languages). The khâgne B/L was created in 1983 in Henri-IV and Lakanal high schools at the same time as a corresponding entrance examination was created at the ENS rue d'Ulm. The goal was to attract good high school students who majored in sciences to literary and social studies.

Both the curriculum of a hypokhâgne and a khâgne B/L is composed of the following subjects, which are considered of equal importance:

- Mathematics (6 hours per week) whose curriculum is similar to the ones of business CPGEs.
- Social sciences (6 hours per week) which encompasses economy, sociology, and objects commonly studied by those two subjects.
- French literature (4 hours per week), unlimited curriculum.
- History (4 hours per week). The curriculum encompasses "World history from 1918 to the present" and "French history from 1870 to the present" and is taught during the two years of the classe prépa.
- Philosophy (4 hours per week), unlimited curriculum.
- A compulsory modern language (2 hours per week)
- An extra option (4 hours per week): extra classes in the compulsory modern language, or another modern language, or an ancient language or geography.
- Sport (2 optional hours per week)

The khâgne B/L prepares students to take the entrance examinations of various schools:

- ENS Ulm (25 places)
- ENS Paris-Saclay (18 places)
- ENS of Lyon (10 places)
- ENSAE (20 places) (National School of Statistics and Economic Administration) attached to France's National Institute of Economic and Statistical Information (INSEE)
- the National School for Statistics and Analysis of Information (ENSAI)
- Business schools (ESSEC, HEC, ESCP Business School, EDHEC, École de management de Lyon, Audencia, etc.)
- the French military academy Saint-Cyr
- the national school for archivists and librarians, École nationale des chartes
- Communication schools (IFJ, etc.) and journalism schools (CELSA, etc.)
- Instituts d'études politiques (IEP, Sciences Po)
- the Engineering school (Management/Advanced mechanics) (ISMANS)

==== University ====
The majority of khâgneux B/L and A/L go on to study at a university once they have completed the khâgne, though an increasing number of khâgneux enroll in grandes écoles such as business schools or engineering schools (ENSAE, ENSAI, etc.). During their studies in classe préparatoire, students are simultaneously enrolled at a university so that the years spent at the classe prépa are recognized by universities: a student having completed the hypokhâgne is allowed to enroll in the second year of university in a chosen subject; a student having completed the khâgne can immediately enter the third and last year of the French bachelor's programme in a chosen subject. After having repeated the khâgne, the student may be granted a partial or a total bachelor's diploma equivalence. In the case of a student who has passed the written exam but failed the oral part, there is the possibility of studying any subject they have done in the written exam at post-graduate level. In addition to grandes écoles and IEPs, khâgne students can also enroll in selective university programmes, such as magistères.

== History ==
Until 1890, secondary school graduates prepared for the entrance examination to the ENS by repeating their classe de rhétorique which corresponds to the final year of secondary education. Teachers would give them more difficult assignments than to high school juniors. Lycée Louis-le-Grand created a special class in order to gather those "veterans": the Première supérieure class, also called rhétorique supérieure, or rhétosup. Lycée Henri-IV then introduced the Lettres supérieures (or Lettres sup) year between the final year and the Première supérieure year. Regarded as a two-year extension of high school studies, Lettres supérieures and Première supérieure was meant to prepare students to the ENS. This system became standard by the 1930s.

As the coursework is intensive, with around 35 hours of classwork per week and a good deal of work on top of that, it can be very stressful for students. The examinations are difficult and competitive and it is common for students either to repeat the second year of classes (in slang cuber) or to fail altogether, in which case they usually obtain a Licence or other qualification. The grading system (0 to 20) reflects the general philosophy of the khâgnes: underscoring the failings of the students rather than their strengths. Consequently, most grades hover between 4 and 11, the latter grade being an excellent grade. This grading system is quite demotivating for students but is part and parcel of the intellectual "boot camp" mentality of the classes prépas educational system.

The classes involve elements of literature (modern and classical), history, philosophy, geography, languages and linguistics-–-a comprehensive humanities-based education-–-but students will normally specialise in one or two subjects. Critics claim that a disproportionate amount of resources is devoted to khâgne students as against the c. 40% of Baccalauréat students who attend a standard university. They therefore see it as a feature of the elitism of the French higher education system, especially since the majority of successful candidates originate from privileged upper-class and middle-class families. Defenders see it as demonstrating an emphasis on quality.

== Terminology ==
=== Etymology ===
The word khâgne (f.) is a pseudo-Graecism, derived from the French adjective cagneux, meaning 'knock-kneed'. During the 19th and early 20th century, the adjective was often used mockingly to describe people in the academic strata, especially those pursuing classical studies. More specifically, the cagneux was used as a taunt by students of the military academy, whose curriculum included physical education such as equestrianism and fencing, against students in the humanities, who were perceived as crouching over their books, thus developing physical deformities.

In the early 20th century, the term cagneux was adapted by humanities students themselves as a mocking self-description but they changed the spelling (khâgneux) to make it look like a Greek loanword.

The play with Greek is even more conspicuous with hypokhâgne, the name of the first year. This word was jocularly derived from khâgne using the Greek prefix ὑπο- hypo, 'under'.

=== Slang terms and folklore ===
Students commonly abbreviate the name of their year using acronyms, hence hypokhâgne is HK [aʃka], khâgne is just K [ka].

In student slang, a former hypokhâgneux attending the khâgne for the first time is called carré (or khârrés). A khâgneux who fails the end-of-year entrance examination to ENS may repeat the khâgne year to try their luck a second time; in which case he or she is called cube (or khûbe). The origin of these terms corresponds to the number of years spent by the student in the system: two years (HK+K) correspond to carré (cf. Fr. m² = mètres carrés = square meter), three (HK+K+K) to cube (cf. m³ = mètres cubes = cubic meter).

A khâgneux who repeats the khâgne twice is called bicarré (or bikhârré), commonly abbreviated as bica. So in a classroom of khâgne, half of the students may be carrés, a third may be cubes, plus a handful of bicas who are trying their last chance at the final examination. Using derived verbs, one can say Je vais cuber. (meaning "I plan to give khâgne a second try"). The verb bicarrer (or bicater) is used for trying a third time: Je vais quand même pas bicarrer! ("I'm not going to try a third year in khâgne!").

== See also ==
- Classe Préparatoire aux Grandes Écoles
- The khâgne is informally discussed in the memoirs of Raymond Aron (1905–1983), who transferred at 17 from a suburban school to Lycée Condorcet in Paris for the two-year khâgne course, and was a classmate at the École Normale Supérieure of Jean-Paul Sartre and Georges Canguilhem. These memoirs (published in English translation in 1990) illustrate the social differences between the education of the intellectual elite in France and in other countries, largely deriving from the unique curriculum and method of the khâgne.
- In The Human Stain, Philip Roth details the life story of Delphine Roux, a character who was educated in Lycée Henri-IV's khâgne and became a normalienne. He also describes the intellectual life of khâgneux in the Latin Quarter, from the point of view of the main character, Coleman Silk.
- Jaesusaeng
- Gaokao
- Rōnin
