= Ormonde Education Group =

Business school

- Type: Private
- Established: 2006
- Location: Tullamore, County Offaly, Ireland
- Affiliations: FETAC, ICM
- Website: www.ormondeducation.com

Ormonde Education Group was a professional education provider based in Tullamore, County Offaly, Ireland. Under the name Ormonde Business School or Ormonde College, the group ran a number of Business, Administration, Accounting(ACCA), Design and IT. The college also ran English language courses, and training for entrance to medical schools.

Courses included Certified Accounting Technician, Accountancy, EDI/JEB Teachers Diploma in IT, Certificate in Childcare, CompTIA training courses, Journalism (IAPR Certificate), and Rodec Design Course, amongst others.

The Ormonde English Language Academy teaches English according to the Common European Framework.

In July 2009 Ormonde bought Ashfield College a secondary school in Templeogue in Dublin, and operated leaving cert course as The Education Centre, they also ran grinds in Tullamore, in 2011 it was bought by City Colleges and reverted to using the name Ashfield College. A number of the adult training courses from Ormonde Business School were run from the Templeogue location.

A petition for the winding-up of the company was presented to the High Court in Dublin on 11 January 2012.
