= Allin Institute =

Coordinates: 51.7468°N 8.7350°W

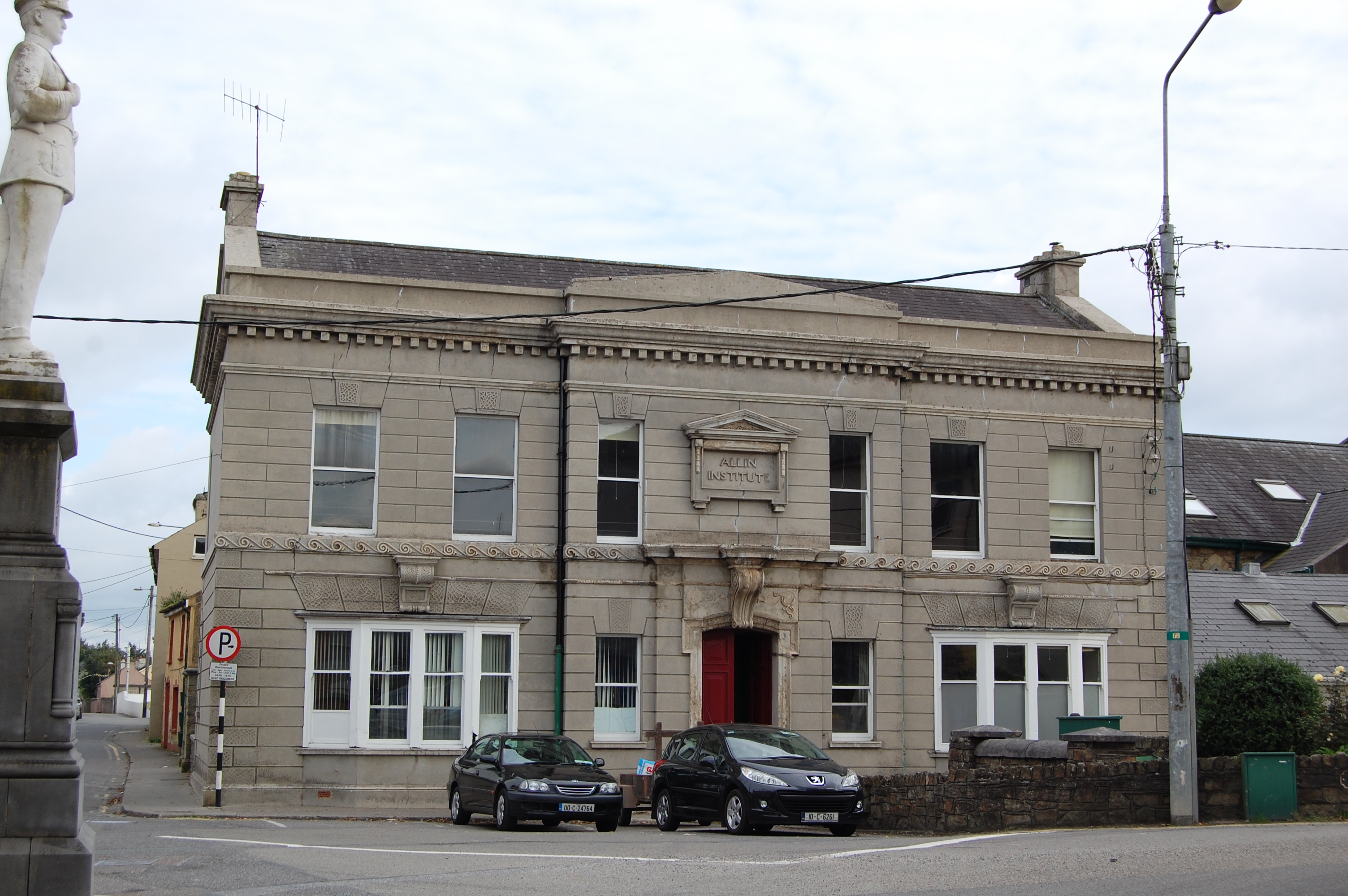
Allin Institute

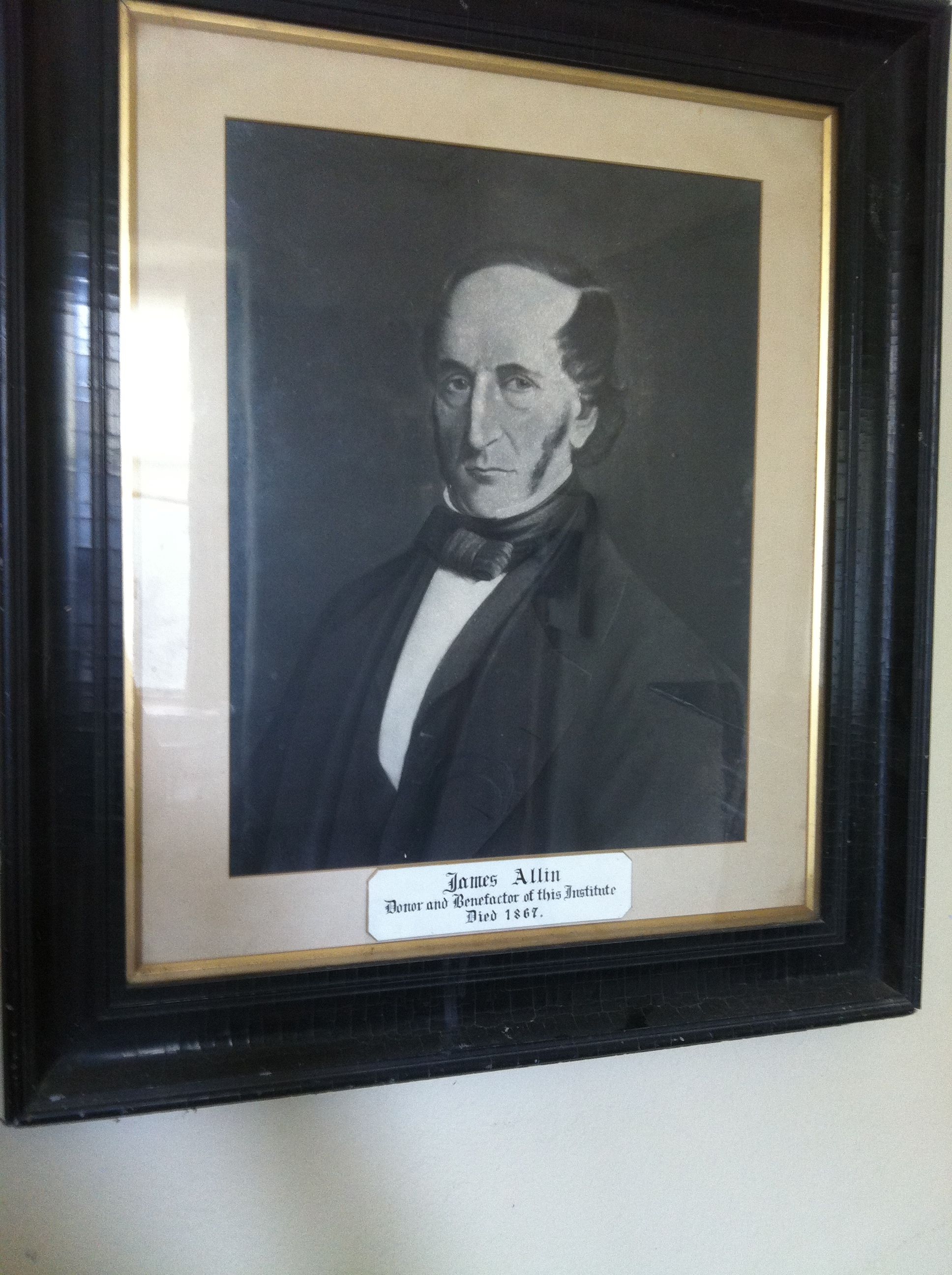
James Allin

The Allin Institute is a building in Bandon, County Cork, Ireland. Formerly known as the Bandon Society Rooms, it was renamed in honour of James Allin (1780–1866) following his death in November 1866. Allin had bequeathed the building to a group of trustees to be used as school for Protestant young men. The property, which was originally three storeys, was burnt on the morning of 29 June 1921. The replacement two storey structure, which exists today, was designed by Irish architect William Henry Hill. It was built, in an Arts and Crafts style, between 1924 and 1925.

As of 2024, the building houses the West Cork Learning Hub (formerly known as Bandon Tuition Centre), a private grinds school. A plaque, commemorating the loss of life during the COVID-19 pandemic in Ireland, was unveiled near the Allin Institute in June 2024.
