= Saint-Albin =

Saint-Albin may refer to:

== Places ==
- Rozet-Saint-Albin, a commune in the Hauts-de-France department in northern France
- Saint-Albin-de-Vaulserre, a commune in the Isère department in southeastern France
- Scey-sur-Saône-et-Saint-Albin, a commune in the Haute-Saône department in eastern France

== People ==
- Alexandre Rousselin de Saint-Albin (1773–1847), French politician
- Charles de Saint-Albin (1698–1764), French archbishop
