= Tram Café Librairie =

Café-bookstore in Paris

Coordinates: 48°50′50″N 2°20′54″E

Tram
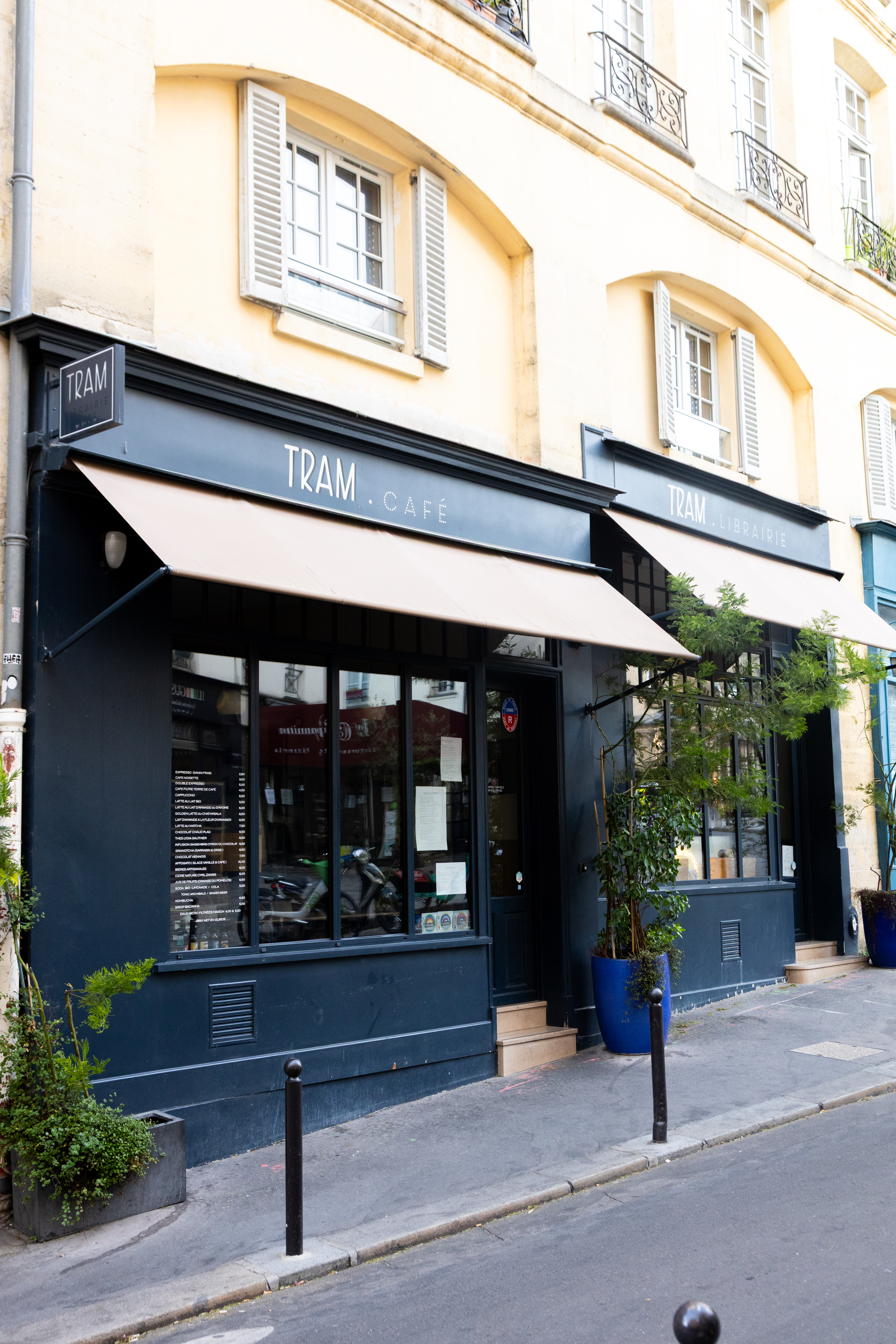
- The storefront in 2025
- Alternative names: Tram Café Librairie

General information
- Address: 47 Rue de la Montagne-Sainte-Geneviève, 75005
- Town or city: Paris
- Country: France

Tram, also known as Tram Café Librairie, is a café and former bookstore in the 5th arrondissement of Paris in France. Located near the Panthéon, the café serves coffee and dessert, as well as breakfast and lunch. Operating until 2023, the adjoining bookstore provided a wide range of books ranging from children's books and bestsellers to graphic novels.

== History ==
Previously, Marion Trama and Paul Hayat had created and run Café Trama in the 6th arrondissement of Paris, on Rue du Cherche-Midi. Afterward, they created Tram Café Librairie, in the fifth, on Rue de la Montagne-Sainte-Geneviève, as a café-bookstore hybrid alongside bookseller Marion Wolff and Michelin-starred chef Alain Trama. Trama and Hayat had been inspired to do so after traveling to San Francisco and visiting City Lights Bookstore in 2018.

In 2023, Tram Café Librairie decided to stop selling books, due to sales performance, and instead focus fully on operating as a restaurant.

== Pop culture ==
The Tram Café Librairie was used for a scene in the second season of the Netflix series Emily in Paris.
