= Jaesusaeng =

South Korean term for students retaking school examinations

Jaesusaeng (Korean: 재수생; Hanja: 再修生; lit. "restudy student") is a Korean term for graduated high school students who decide to spend a year studying to re-take the College Scholastic Ability Test, hoping to get a higher score and enter the university of their choice. Attending university has a major impact on their future careers. The equivalent term in Japan is rōnin.

== Social context ==
Gaining entrance to the extremely competitive and prestigious SKY universities in Seoul requires that some students become jaesusaeng after an initial less-than-stellar performance on the national exam. Korea is "prepossessed by social status and reputation," and a SKY education is the main way to gain social status.

Generally, the public education system is not enough to prepare students for the exam, so most students attend after school lessons at various hagwon (cram schools). The fierce competition for enrollment at prestigious universities is called "entrance exam war" (입시전쟁; 入試戰爭; ipsi jeonjaeng).

== Effects ==
The stress from constant study and limited social life as a student have contributed to an increase in suicide in South Korea; for children aged 10 to 19 years old, suicide is the second most common cause of death in the country.

== Related term ==
When a student fails to earn an adequate score over 3 or more years, he may be derisively referred to as a jangsusaeng (장수생; 長壽生; lit. "long life student") a play on words from the expression "Please live a long life" said to elders (장수 하세요). Beginning around 2010, the word "N susaeng" (엔수생; N壽生) is in common use, wherein the Chinese character jang (長, meaning "long") is replaced with the Latin letter N, which represents the undefined number of times the student is taking the test.

== See also ==
- Bǔ kè, in China
- Rōnin, in Japan
- Hagwon
- Education in South Korea
- Cram school
- Dek siw, in Thailand
