= Dek siw =

Thai high school graduate preparing to retake university entrance exam

Dek siw (Thai language: เด็กซิ่ว) means "fossil student" and refers to Thai students who have graduated from high school but not yet entered a university. Dek siw spend a year (or more) studying at home or at cram school hoping to do better on GAT-PAT, O-Net and the central examinations for a better chance to gain admittance a top university.

In Thai, Dek is defined as "a child" or someone younger. In this context, "Dek" refers to students. The word ‘Siw’ comes from the word ‘fossils’ in the English language. For this situation, ‘Siw’ means to have skipped a year or transferred to another university after a year. Although Dek Siw is a noun, it can be used as a verb by reducing it to ‘Siw.’

== Description ==
Dek Siw can also specifically mean a student who transfers from one university to be a freshman at another university again. Students can choose to ‘siw’ for a variety of reasons. Primarily, there are a few main cases. The first is that they aren't satisfied with what they have learned from the faculty or the institution. Another issue is that the students are not able to enroll in the university that they expect, so they are forced to enroll in another university that is less preferred. In addition, issues with one's mental and physical health, finances, or relationships with others in society.

Because of their prior university experience, Dek Siw students are known to excel in their first year. Their performance in subsequent years will depend on their ability to move beyond established patterns. There is no limit to how often one can "siw."

== Method ==
=== Precaution ===
There are some regulations for Dek Siw before reapplying for the central examination. Some universities only accept students who just graduated from high school or have completed twelfth grade or equivalent. Therefore, students would be unqualified for admission in the next year. Another restriction is that the student will not be able to use their old scores from previous examinations due to expiration. Important deadlines and admission regulations must be monitored thoroughly before and during the ‘siw’ period.

=== Mindset ===
The essential step in making such a decision is to understand oneself and choose a suitable path for their future. Without a goal, students can often be lost in their world making it complicated to utilize a gap year effectively. Hence, students should know the reason why they wanted to ’siw’ priorly.

=== Question to ask self ===
- Why do you want to take a year out?
- What do you want to achieve from this?
- How much time do you have?
- How many resources do you need?

=== Choosing ‘Siw’ ===
Prior, the student should decide between’siw’ and learn or to ’siw’ and stay home which is dependent on their situation. Though both can develop a productive gap year which can be valuable for student studies or portfolios (UCAS website). Students then should evaluate their past examinations to assess what they should improve on. Alternatively, if the student chooses to ‘siw’ themselves then they can integrate extracurricular activities or any other pastime. For a successful ‘siw’ It is immensely necessary to research and plan what the student will do for the gap time which is typically about a year. This should also include how the student will return to their education. Students can make a list of the topic they lacked to later study, either or both, individually or with a tutor. Furthermore, numerous gap year activities can enhance undiscovered aspects of the students. These extracurricular programs, activities, and volunteers vary in location, length, cost, and deadline. Essentially, money should be considered to cover living expenses and additional education of choice.

=== Possible activities during ‘Siw’ ===
Self-focused activities: Activities that destress and enhance one's mental state, this can be done alone or with someone who is closely familiar. The goal of these activities is to relax and take time off the current regular lifestyle.

- Rest
- Travel

Educational activities: Activities that can develop academic skills or prepare for examinations. This can be done alone or with the help of a professional.

- Self-study.
- Tutor class
  - Cram school
  - Hagwon
- Part-time courses

Financial activities: Activities that can earn money since some people do not have enough money to pay for their higher education. These activities allow the student to earn money and teach some real-life skills.

- Paid employment
- Part time job

Life experience activities: Activities that the individual can face and earn new experiences outside of books and classes. Some activities are chosen from one's interest to benefit further education or gain more knowledge about a specific subject. While some activities are done out of generosity to help charity or causes.

- Volunteer internationally or nationally
- Internship
- Work exchange

== Theory ==
=== Word formation ===
Dek siw is slang that reflects word formation and the theory of language change. According to this research, the author not only applies the previously mentioned idea but also the theory of language change that is also used by Vandergriff (as cited by Umar, n.d.) that consists of these five groups: to define meaning, to limit meaning, to expand meaning, to seek for varied meaning and to preserve the meaning. This word is formed by multiple processes and compounding, two methods widely used (Wongsathian, 2020). Dek is originally the Thai language. Dek means child or student.

For the term ‘fossil,’ was formed by borrowing from a foreign language from The Mechanical Formation of New Words (as cited in Devaphalin, 1988 ). However, the meaning of fossil is changed (Wongsathian, 2020). It is originally, according to the Cambridge Dictionary(n.d.), defined as “the shape of a bone, a shell, or a plant or animal that has been preserved in rock for a very long period.” In this context, fossil becomes a verb describing the action of delaying the time to retake the examination to enter the university that the individual hopes.

Then, the two words are combined to create a new noun. The first word is the subject that is described in the following part. The pattern of this compound noun is noun and noun. (Kawtrakul et al., n.d.). So, the definition of Dek siw is a student who is willing to retake the exam to enter the university where the individual determines to study.

== Effects ==
=== Advantage ===
- Extended the time to find self and get to know the character deeper — find true passions and dreams.
- An opportunity to break from academic stress and refresh.
- A productive time off can be valuable and aid in studies.
- Develop new skills in the area you plan to study.
- Save money on plans.
- Develop maturity and gain a broader perspective through experiences.

=== Disadvantage ===
- A gap year can make the individual feel uncomfortable studying in formal education again or get pressure from readjusting him/herself to a new environment.
- The cost can be expensive to organize interesting activities, travel or take part-time courses.
- There is a potential for not getting the expected experience from a gap year.
- The graduation delays.
- Some people might not support your decision to take a gap year.

== By country ==
=== Japan ===
Rōnin In Japan, the term that is similar to Dek siw is Ronin. The word ‘ronin’ is a student cannot pass the exam to the next level or enter where they expect.

=== South Korea ===
Jaejusaeng In South Korea, Jaesusaeng is the term that means the students who choose to take a gap year to restudy and retake the exam to get to where they hope as same as Dek Siw does.

=== Western Countries ===
Gapper This term means “a young person who is spending a year working or traveling after leaving school and before going to university.” (Oxford University Press, 2015, p. 627) There is a difference between gapper and dek siw. To take a gap in Western culture is to improve their qualifications or experience activities you want, including traveling, internship, or being a volunteer (UCAS, n.d.). In contrast, dek siw, also ronin and jaesusaeng, is focused on reexamination to proceed to a higher level of education, from high school to university for instance.

== See also ==
- Rōnin
- Gaokao
- Juku
- Cram school
- Jaesusaeng
- Bǔ kè
