= Montagne Sainte-Geneviève =

Hill in Paris, France

Coordinates: 48°50′47″N 2°20′45″E

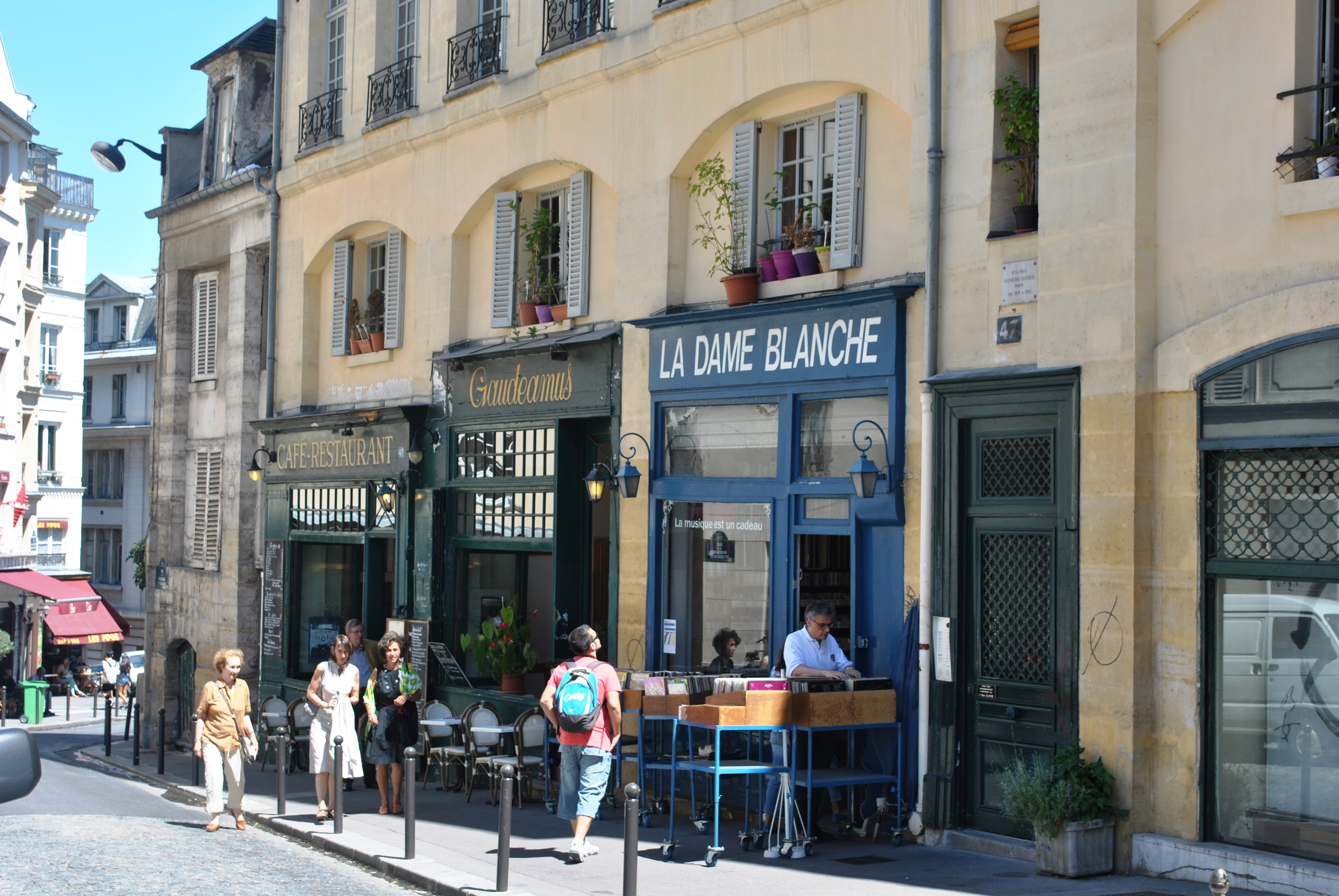
Rue de la Montagne Sainte Geneviève

The Montagne Sainte-Geneviève (French pronunciation: [mɔ̃taɲ sɛ̃t ʒənvjɛv]) is a hill overlooking the left bank of the Seine in the 5th arrondissement of Paris, France. It was known to the ancient Romans as Mons Lucotitius. Atop the Montagne are the Panthéon and the Bibliothèque Sainte-Geneviève. The side streets of the Montagne feature bars and restaurants, for example, in the Rue Mouffetard.

Moreover, the former campus of the École Polytechnique, located on the Montagne, now is the Ministry of Research. On the other side of the Montagne lie the rue d'Ulm and the École Normale Supérieure. Around AD 1110, the scholar and philosopher, Peter Abelard, established a school on the Montagne; twenty-six years later, Abelard returned, in the year 1136.

== See also ==
- Abbey of St Genevieve
- Lycée Henri IV
- Lycée Saint-Louis
- Lycée Louis-le-Grand
- Les trois lycées de la montagne
- École supérieure de physique et de chimie industrielles de la ville de Paris (ESPCI ParisTech)
- Saint-Étienne-du-Mont
- Genevieve
- Quartier Latin
- Collège Sainte-Barbe
- Collège de Boncourt
- Collège de Navarre
- Institut Henri Poincaré
