= Classe préparatoire aux grandes écoles =

French undergraduate education prior to entering grandes écoles

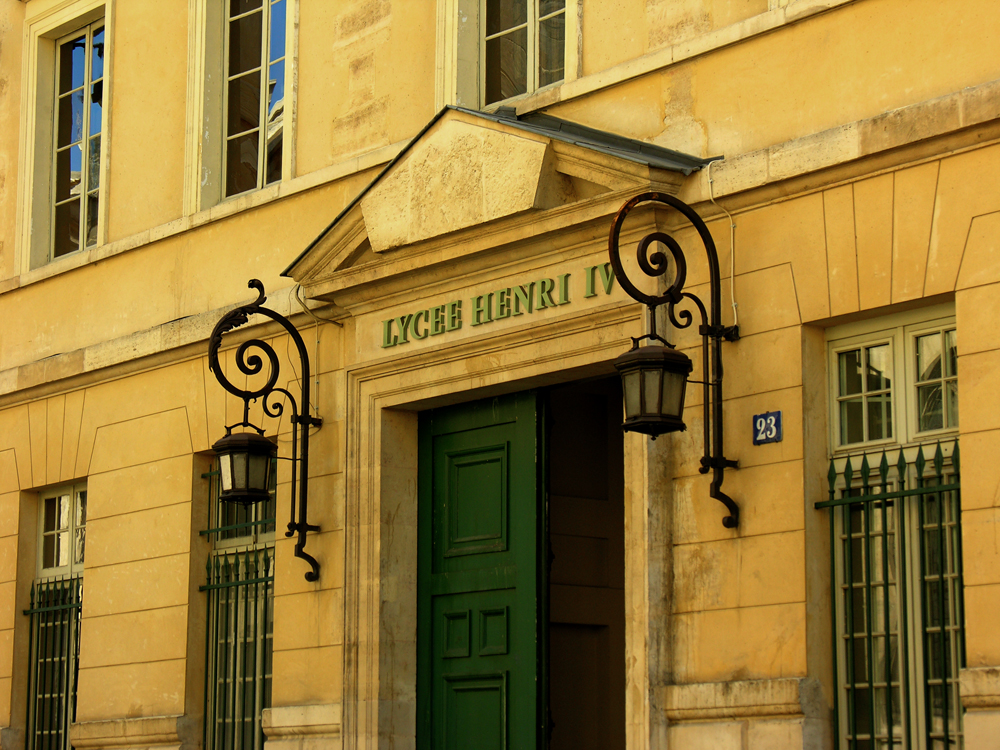
Front entrance of Lycée Henri-IV, in Paris, one of the famous Lycées providing access to Grandes écoles.

The Classes préparatoires aux grandes écoles (French pronunciation: [klas pʁepaʁatwaʁ o ɡʁɑ̃dz‿ekɔl], Higher school preparatory classes, abbr. CPGE), commonly called classes prépas or prépas, are part of the French post-secondary education system. They consist of two years of study (extendable to three or exceptionally four years) which act as an intensive preparatory course (or cram school) with the main goal of training students for enrolment in one of the grandes écoles. Whereas enrollment in public universities in France is open to any school leaver with an adequate baccalauréat, enrollment in the grandes écoles is restricted to the highest-ranked students in a separate national competitive examination. Preparation for this examination entails one of the highest student workloads in Europe (29 to 45 contact hours a week, with up to 10 hours of guided tutorials and oral exam sessions).

The grandes écoles are higher education establishments (graduate schools) delivering master's degrees and rarely doctorates. They include science and engineering schools, business schools, the four veterinary colleges, the four écoles normales supérieures and the École Nationale des Chartes but do not include medical or law schools, nor architecture schools. Because of the competitive entrance exams, having attended one of the grandes écoles is often regarded as a status symbol, as they have traditionally produced most of France's scientists, executives and intellectuals. Each grande école uses one of three different examinations, each with its own prépas: scientific, economic, and literary.

Some preparatory classes can be considered "elite", being extremely selective, and recruiting only the best students from each high school, if not the best student from each high school. These schools practically guarantee their students a place in one of the top grandes écoles. Among them are the Lycée Louis-Le-Grand, the Lycée Henri-IV, the Lycée Saint-Louis (these three are known as les trois lycées de la montagne), the Lycée Janson de Sailly, the Lycée Hoche, the Lycée Stanislas and the Lycée privé Sainte-Geneviève.

== Admission ==
The CPGE are located within high schools for historical reasons (Napoleon created them at first as fourth to sixth year of high school) but pertain to tertiary education, which means that each student must have successfully passed their baccalauréat (or equivalent) to be admitted to CPGE. Moreover, the admission to the CPGE is usually based on performance during the last two years of high school, called première and terminale. Thus, each CPGE receives thousands of applications from around the world every April and May, and selects its new students under its own criteria (mostly excellence). A few CPGE programmes, mainly the private CPGEs (which account for 10% of CPGEs), also have an interview process or look at a student's involvement in the community.

In June 2007, 534,300 students passed the "Baccalauréat", and 40,000 (7.5%) of them were admitted to CPGE. On a given class at one of the prep schools listed above, around 1500 application files will be examined for only 40 places. Students are selected according to their grades in High school and the first part of "Baccalauréat" (equivalent to A-levels in the United Kingdom or Advanced Placement in the United States).

== Degree ==
Preparatory classes are officially not authorized to deliver any degrees, but they give ECTS credits that can be used to fulfill university degree requirements since the 2009–2010 academic year, and students who decide to carry on their studies at a public university.

However, many prépas also establish conventions with universities to validate a full 2nd or 3rd year degree upon graduation for CPGE students who perform well, especially in literary prépas ("khâgne"). Most of the students in these classes receive part of their education at a public university, so that the teachers' council can deliver them the corresponding grade in one or two disciplines at the end of the year (only up to a bachelor's degree for 3 years of CPGE).

== Organization ==
CPGE exist in three different fields of study: science & engineering, business, and humanities. All CPGE programs have a nominal duration of two years, but the second year is sometimes repeated once.

=== Scientific CPGE ===
An overview of all the different options when attending a scientific cpge

The oldest CPGEs are the scientific ones, which can be accessed only Bacheliers having followed scientific courses during lycée. The different tracks are the following:

- BCPST1, Biologie, Chimie, Physique, Sciences de la Terre ("biology, chemistry, physics and earth sciences") in the first year, followed by BCPST2
- MPSI, Mathématiques, Physique, Sciences de l'Ingénieur ("mathematics, physics, and engineering science") in the first year, followed by either MP ("mathematics and physics") or PSI ("physics and engineering science")
- MP2I, Mathématiques, Physique, Ingéniérie et Informatique ("mathematics, physics, engineering science and computer science") in the first year, followed by either MPI ("mathematics, physics and computer science"), MP ("mathematics and physics") or PSI ("physics and engineering science")
- PCSI, Physique, Chimie, Sciences de l'Ingénieur ("physics, chemistry, and engineering science") in the first year, followed by PC ("physics and chemistry") or PSI ("physics and engineering science")
- PTSI, Physique, Technologie, Sciences de l'Ingénieur ("physics, technology, and engineering science") in the first year, followed by PT ("physics and technology") or PSI ("physics and engineering science")
- TB1, Technologie, Biologie ("technology and biology") in the first year, followed by TB2
- TPC1, Technologie, Physique et Chimie ("technology, physics and chemistry") in the first year, followed by TPC2
- TSI1, Physique, Technologie, Sciences Industrielles ("physics, technology, industrial science") in the first year, followed by TSI2
- ATS, Adaptation Techniciens Supérieurs ("Adaptation for Skilled Technicians") are specifically targeting BTS and DUT students and last only a year. They are mainly based on the curriculum of PTSI and PCSI and are subdivided into five branches: Biologie ("Biology"), Ingénierie Industrielle ("Industrial engineering"), Génie Civil ("Civil engineering"), Métiers de la Chimie ("Chemistry jobs") and Métiers de l'horticulture et du paysage ("Horticultural and landscape jobs").

The classes that especially train students for admission to the top schools, such as Écoles Normales Supérieures, École polytechnique and some other, have an asterisk added to their name. For example, MP*, is usually called MP étoile ("MP star") (except for the BCPST2 and TB2 classes, which do not make this distinction).

Both the first and second year programmes include as much as ten to twelve hours of mathematics teaching per week, ten hours of physics, two hours of literature and philosophy, two to four hours of (one or two) foreign language(s) teaching and two to eight hours of minor options: either SI, engineering industrial science, chemistry or theoretical computer science, biology-geology, biotechnologies. Added to this are several hours of homework, which can amount to as much as the official hours of class.

The BCPST classes prepare for exams of engineering schools of life sciences (agronomy, forestry, environmental and food sciences) but also to veterinary schools, engineering schools of earth sciences, and the three Ecoles Normales Supérieures. Compare to the other classes, it teaches biology and geology.

In scientific CPGE, the first year of CPGE is usually called the maths sup, or hypotaupe (sup for "classe de mathématiques supérieures", superior in French, meaning post-high school), and second year maths spé, or taupe, (spés for "classe de mathématiques spéciales", special in French). The students of these classes are called taupins, which is a French word for "mole", referring to the lifestyle of students in classes preparatoires whose workload obliges them to spend most of their time studying instead of going out to enjoy social life.

=== Scientific competitive entry exam ===
There are unique entrance exams for each school, but there are also common exams, grouping several engineering schools, designed for students in preparatory science classes. Across all streams, students in preparatory science classes can register for the following common exams or exam banks:

- The Écoles normales supérieures (ENS) entrance exam; it allows access to the four Écoles normales supérieures: ENS Ulm, ENS Lyon, ENS Paris-Saclay, and ENS Rennes; it is combined with the École Polytechnique exam for the "PSI" track;
- The École Polytechnique entrance exam; it is combined with the ESPCI ParisTech exam for the "PC" track, and with the ENS Paris-Saclay exam for the "PSI" track, as mentioned above;
- The Mines-Ponts common exam, along with its associated exams: the TPE/EIVP common exam and the Mines-Télécom exam;
- The Centrale-Supélec exam;
- The National Polytechnic Institutes common exam (CCINP), formerly Polytechnic Common Exams (CCP);
- The e3a exam (some of its exams are shared with the CCINP bank);
- The EPITA-IPSA-ESME exam;
- The military schools' exams: ESM Saint-Cyr, École Navale, École de l'air, and ENSTA Bretagne;
- The actuarial schools' exams: Euro-Institute of Actuarial Studies (EURIA), Institute of Financial and Insurance Sciences (ISFA), and the Institute of Statistics at the University of Paris (ISUP);
- The PT Bank;
- The ATS exams;
- The agronomy and veterinary exams;
- The Geology, Water, and Environment exam bank.

=== Literary and humanities CPGE ===
There are two literary and humanities CPGEs.

The first of these prépas, nicknamed "hypokhâgne" for the first year and "khâgne" for the second year, is focused on a strong pluri-disciplinary course, including all humanities: philosophy, literature, history, geography, foreign languages, and ancient languages (Latin and Ancient Greek). The students are called the "hypokhâgneux" and the "khâgneux". These classes prepare for the entrance exam of the elite schools called Écoles Normales Supérieures, which are considered among the most difficult exams of the French system. Nevertheless, the students can now also apply for many other entrance exams.

There are three types of Khâgne:

- Khâgne "Ulm", which prepares more specifically for the A/L entrance exam of the ENS Paris;
- Khâgne "Lyon", which prepares more specifically for the A/L entrance exam of the ENS Lyon;
- Khâgne "B/L", which prepares for the B/L entrance exam of the four ENS. Its particularity is the presence of mathematics and social sciences.

Now, the grouping of many examinations make the difference between khâgnes "Lyon" and "Ulm" is slight, and many prépas have mixed classes with many students preparing for both ENS (or even the three for students specialising in English).

Khâgneux can apply to many grandes écoles, other high schools and all universities, among which are the following:

- The four "Écoles Normales Supérieures": ENS Paris, ENS Lyon, ENS Rennes, ENS Paris-Saclay (the last one being only for B/L or English)
- The École des Chartes
- The main French business schools (through complementary examinations at the final exam): HEC, ESSEC, ESCP, EDHEC Business School, EMLYON Business School, Audencia Business School, SKEMA Business School, Grenoble Ecole de Management, NEOMA, KEDGE, etc.
- The main Instituts d'études politiques ("Sciences Po")
- Many journalism and communication schools (such as CELSA)

Similar but distinct to Khâgne, the Classe préparatoire à l'École des chartes is the second literary and humanities CPGE. This prépa is divided into two different branches, known as "Chartes A", with an emphasis on medieval history and ancient languages, and "Chartes B", with an emphasis on contemporary history.

The followed curricula vary from year 1 to year 2:

- In first year (sometimes called “hypochartes”), Chartes A students follow courses in medieval history, modern history, French literature, foreign languages, Latin to French translation (known as version), plus a choice between French to Latin translation (known as thème) and ancient Greek to French translation. Chartes B, on the other hand, follow courses in modern history, contemporary history, French literature, foreign languages, plus a choice between Latin version, art history, geography and a second foreign language.
- In second year, Chartes A and B students take the same set of courses as in year 1, with the addition of contemporary history for A students, and medieval history for B students.

The CPGE Chartes curricula are specifically tailored to prepare students for the entrance exam of the Ecole Nationale des Chartes, but students can also apply to CELSA and several Instituts d'études politiques.

=== Economics CPGE ===
Those CPGEs, which are focused on economics (which prepare the admission to Top French business schools such as HEC Paris, ESSEC, ESCP, EMLYON, EDHEC Business School, Audencia Business School, etc.), are known as Prépa HEC (preparing for the Hautes Ecoles de Commerce) and are split into three parts:

==== ECS1 (Economics and Commercial Scientific way), followed by ECS2 ====
Course	Hours/week
Mathematics	12 h
History, Geography and Geopolitics	6 h
Foreign Language 1	3 h
Foreign Language 2	3 h
Philosophy	3 h
Literature	3 h
Economics (optional)	1 h

==== ECE1 (Economics and Commercial Economics way), followed by ECE2 ====
Since 2021, ECE and ECS classes have been merged into a single "ECG" course, the French baccalauréat having been reformed (notably, the iconic "S", "ES" and "L" filières, which until now served to divide students between ECS and ECE classes, have been abolished).

Course	Hours/week
Mathematics	9 h
Economics, Sociology and History	6 h
Further Economics	2 h
Foreign Language 1	3 h
Foreign Language 2	3 h
Philosophy	3 h
Literature	3 h

==== ECT1 (Economics and Commercial Technological way), followed by ECT2 ====
Course	Hours/week
Mathematics	6 h
Management	5 h
Economics	3 h
Law	3 h
Foreign Language 1	4 h
Foreign Language 2	5 h
Philosophy	3 h
Literature	3 h

Classe préparatoire ECS are for those who graduated with the general Baccalauréat S (Scientific), Classe préparatoire ECE are for those who graduated with the general Baccalauréat ES (Economics and Social sciences), while the Classe préparatoire ECT are for those who obtained a Baccalauréat Technologique.

Both the first and second year programms include ten hours of mathematics teaching per week completed by 6 hours of geopolitics, six hours of French and philosophy, and three hours of each language (2 languages) in the "ECS" section. The same applies to the "ECE" section, the difference being that students study for 8 hours Economics and Sociology with a historical focus instead of geopolitics.

==== Other Economics CPGE ====
There is also the D1 and D2 CPGE, also known as ENS Cachan CPGE:

- D1 (law and economy): the students attend both university (taking courses at the law faculty) and CPGE's School. They study civil law, economics, and they choose business law, public law or mathematics; one language (mostly English, German, Spanish and Italian), but they can study a second language for the Écoles de commerce, and general culture. At university, they study constitutional law, criminal law and administrative law. At the end of the two years, students go to ENS Rennes, École de commerce, Sciences Po or some selective university of law. This CPGE is open for Baccalauréats L, ES and S.
- D2 (economy and management): students attend both to university (taking courses in economics or mathematics) and CPGE's school.

The D1 and D2 programs are selective tracks that offer multidisciplinary training.

- ATS (Economics and Management), "Economie et Gestion", pathway is also available for BTS and DUT students who wants to go on to a business school via entry in the 4th post-baccalaureate year instead of the 3rd like most CPGE.

== Life in a CPGE ==
=== The "Khôlle" ===
The amount of work required from the students is exceptionally high.

In addition to class time and homework, students spend several hours each week completing exams and colles (very often written "khôlles" to look like a Greek word, this spelling initially being a literary prépa joke). The "colles" are unique to the French academic education in CPGEs. They consist of oral examinations twice a week, in maths, physics, chemistry, biology and earth sciences (in BCPST classes), French and a foreign language, usually English, German or Spanish. Students, alone or in groups (generally three people), spend 20 minutes to an hour facing a professor in a room, answering questions and solving problems. Similarly, in "ECE/ECS classes", students generally undergo 2 khôlles a week, each subject being regularly tested. Weekly exams often happen on Saturday mornings and last 2 to 6 hours, depending on the CPGE and on the subject being tested.

In "hypokhâgne/khâgne", the system of "colles" is a bit different. They are taken every quarter in every subject. Students usually have one hour to prepare a short presentation that takes the form of a French-style dissertation (a methodologically codified essay, typically structured in three parts: thesis, counter-thesis, and synthesis) in history, philosophy, etc. on a given topic, or that of a commentaire composé (a methodologically codified commentary) in literature and foreign languages; as for the Ancient Greek or Latin, they involve a translation and a commentary. The student then has 20 minutes to present part of their prepared work to the teacher, who ends the session by asking some questions on the presentation and on the corresponding topic.

"Khôlles" are important as they prepare the students, from the very first year, for the oral part of the competitive examination. They are also useful to make sure they learn and understand lessons by testing them on a regular basis.

=== The "cinq demis" ===
A student (in a scientific CPGE) who repeats the second year obtains the status of cinq demis ("five halves"). They were only trois demis ("three halves") during their first second-year and un demi ("one half") in the first year. The explanation behind these names is that the most coveted engineering school is the École polytechnique, nicknamed the "X" (as the mathematical unknown). A student who enrolls in (the word for which is "integrates" in French) this school after the second year of preparatory class is traditionally called a "3/2" because this is the value of the integral of x from 1 to 2.

$\int_1^2 \! x\,\mathrm dx \ = \frac{2^2}{2}-\frac{1^2}{2} =\frac{3}{2}$

The same idea is valid for cinq demis: the integral of x from 2 to 3 is "5/2".

$\int_2^3 \! x\,\mathrm dx \ = \frac{3^2}{2}-\frac{2^2}{2} = \frac{5}{2}$

Students in their first year of literary and business CPGEs are called bizuths and, in their second year, carrés ("squares"). Students enrolled in their "second" second year are also called "cubes" or "khûbes", it being a synonym of "cinq-demi", and a few turn to bicarrés for a third and final second year. Some ambitious professors encourage their top students to avoid or postpone admittance to other prestigious schools in order to try to get a better school.

== See also ==
- Education in France
- Grandes écoles
