= Maurice Goldring =

French academic and writer (1933–2020)

- Born: 10 January 1933; Lille, France
- Died: 30 October 2020 (aged 87); Biarritz, France
- Occupations: Academic; Writer

Maurice Goldring (10 January 1933 – 30 October 2020) was a French academic and writer.

== Biography ==
Born into a family of communist sympathizers, he joined the youth organizations of the French Communist Party during his adolescence and officially joined the party at the age of 17. He studied English in Paris and earned his CAPES before becoming a teacher at the Lycée Saint-Louis and the Lycée Fénelon. In 1969, he became an assistant professor at the University of Paris-VIII.

In the early 1960s, he joined the editorial board of the political newspaper La Nouvelle Critique, previously directed by Jean Kanapa before Guy Besse took charge. There, he published numerous articles on international issues, including those taking place in Ireland. He joined the federal council of the French Communist Party, serving from 1964 to 1968. He studied at the party's school in 1971.

In 1974, Goldring left France to teach at New York University. His time in New York City inspired him to write Survivre à New York, published in 1976. In 1982, he published Sous le marteau, la Plume alongside Yvonne Quilès, another former member of the French Communist Party, which exposed positions of "modernists" within the party. In addition to his writing career, he also engaged in independent research. He obtained a doctoral degree in 1991 while defending his thesis, Dublin 1904-1924, and becoming a university professor the following year. He continued to follow the issue of The Troubles after his retirement in 1997.

Politically, Goldring joined the Socialist Party, leading a collective of people moving "from communism to reformism". In 2004, he published Les ex-communistes – Éloge de l'infidélité, a work aimed at explaining and justifying his career.

Maurice Goldring died in Biarritz on 30 October 2020 at the age of 87.

== Publications ==
- Démocratie Croissance Zéro (1976)
- L'Irlande : Ideologie D'Une Revolution Nationale ( 1975)
- Survivre à New York (1976)
- Sous le marteau, la plume (1982)
- Dublin 1904-1924. Réveil culturel, révolte sociale, révolution politique, un patrimoine déchiré (1991)
- Gens de Belfast : deux peuples sans frontières (1994)
- Désirs de paix, relents de guerre : Afrique du Sud, Proche Orient, Irlande du Nord (1996)
- Sean, soldat de l’IRA (1999)
- Voie royale, voie républicaine (2000)
- Le trèfle et l’étoile. Juifs irlandais, histoires parallèles, mémoires croisées (2001)
- Neige sur Galway (2001)
- Les ex-communiste. Éloge de l’infidélité (2004)
