= Les trois lycées de la montagne =

French lycées

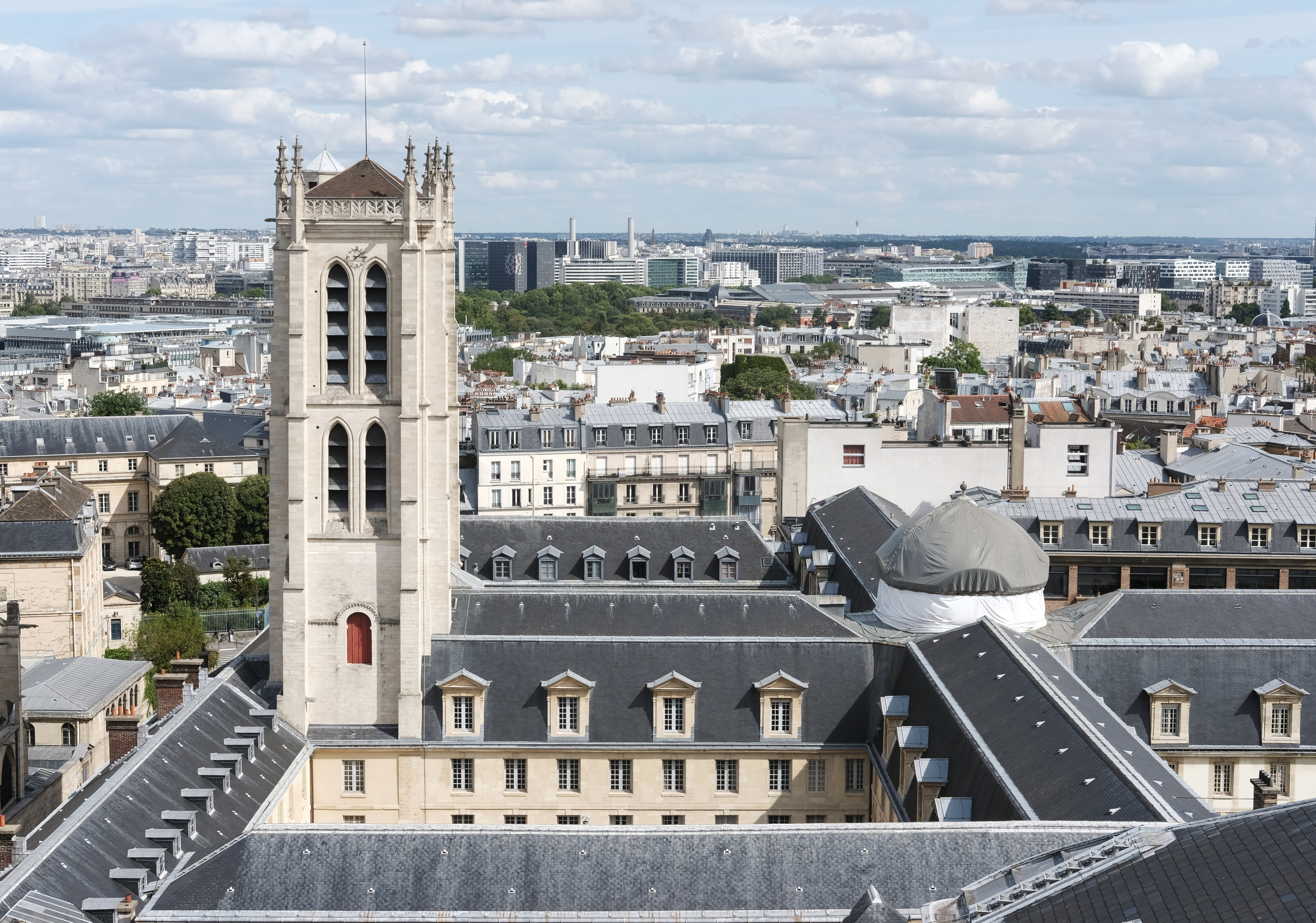
Lycée Henri IV

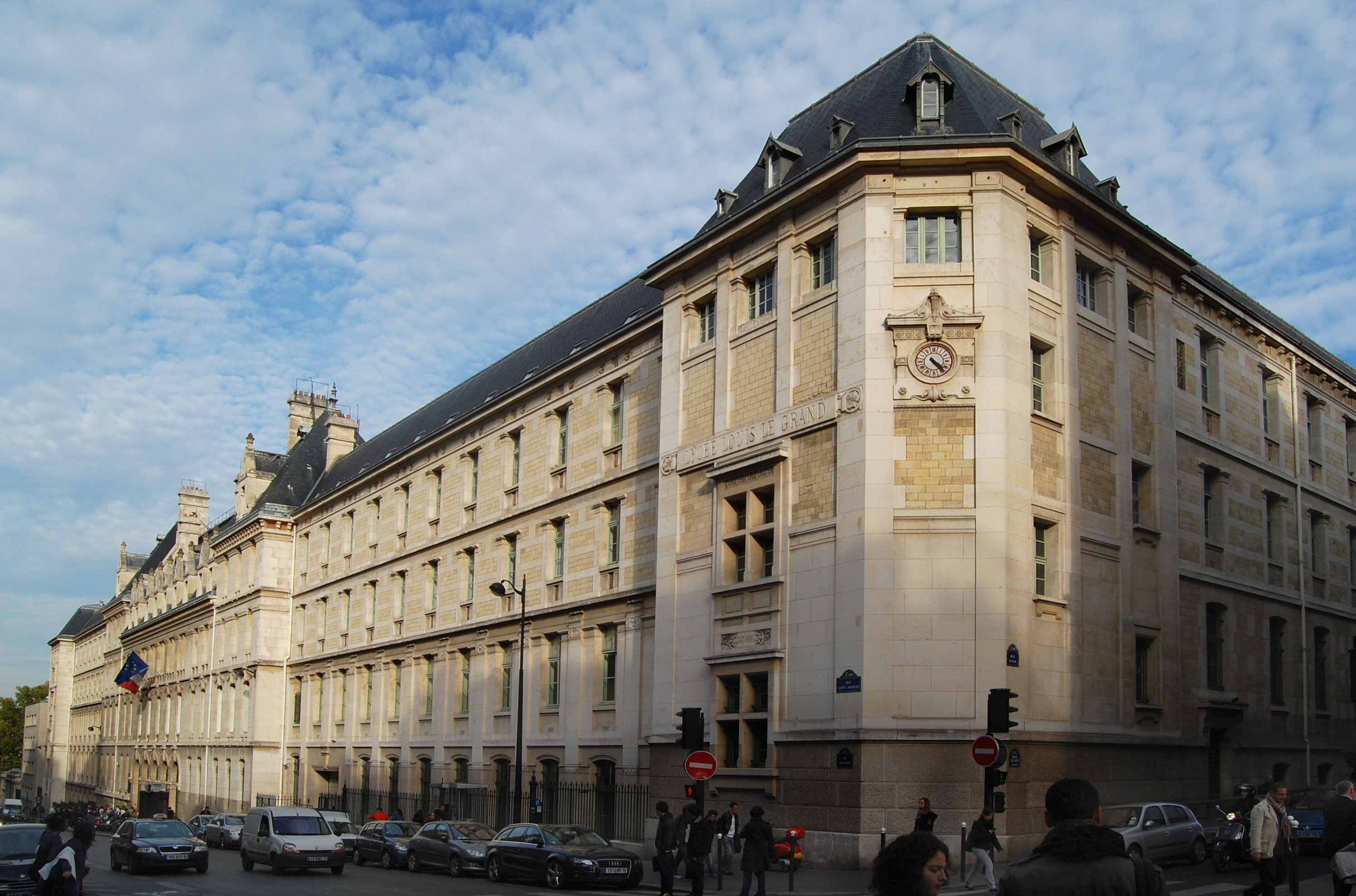
Lycée Louis-le-Grand

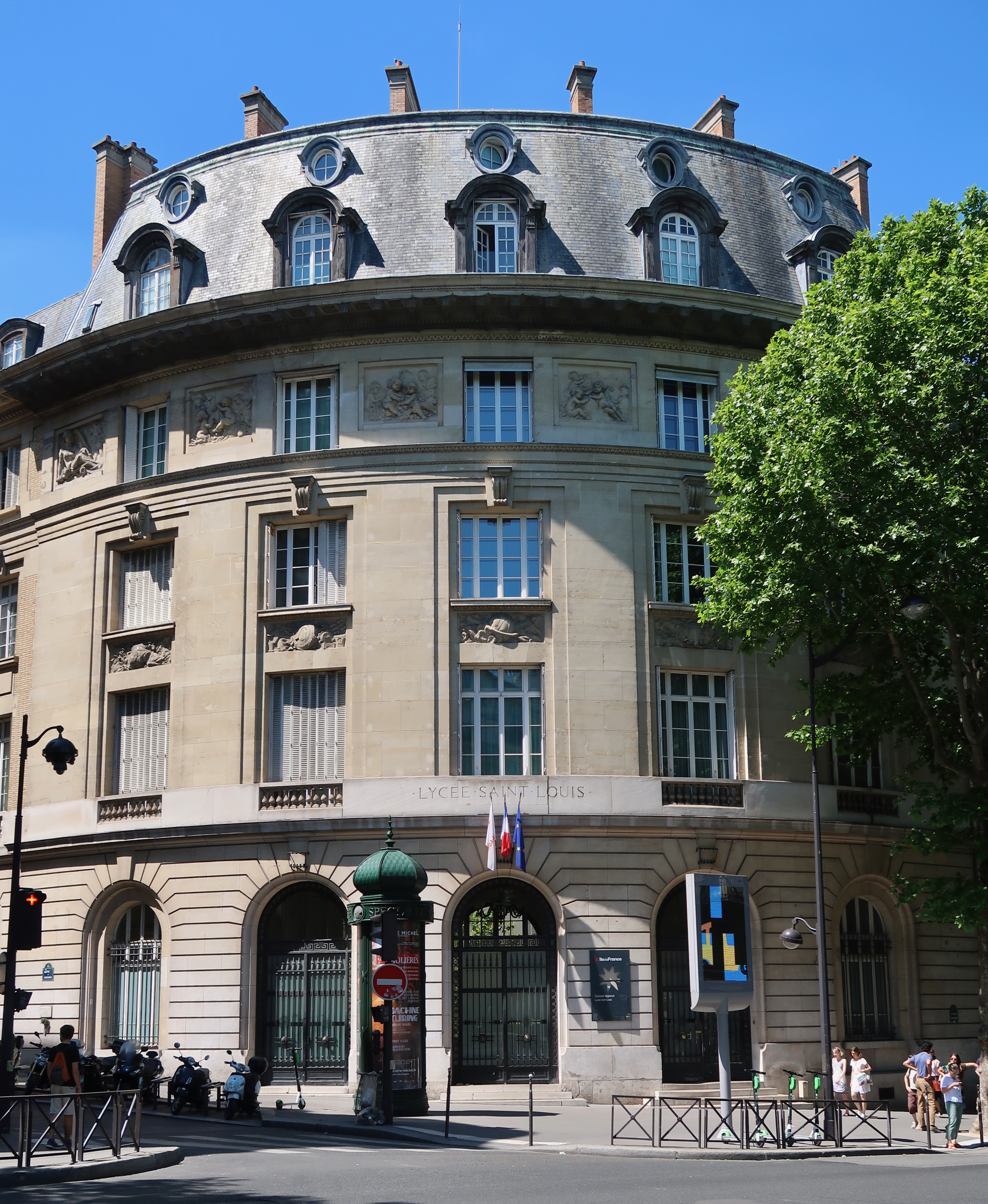
Lycée Saint-Louis

Les trois lycées de la montagne (French pronunciation: [le tʁwa lise də la mɔ̃taɲ], lit. 'The mountain's three highschools') is a term used to refer to three elite schools in Paris – the lycée Henri IV, lycée Louis-le-Grand and the lycée Saint-Louis – to contrast with other French lycées, and to suggest characteristics uniting them, with an implied higher social and intellectual rank or elitism.

The term refers to the hill Montagne Sainte-Geneviève on which the three lycées, regarded as among the most prestigious of France, are located. Student traditions include chess and essays competitions as well as other partnership between the lycées. One tradition carried by classes préparatoires students consists in stealing the most Christmas trees installed in front of the Panthéon located near the lycées.

While the Lycée Saint-Louis only offers classes préparatoires so recruits students based on highly selective criteria through Parcoursup, the Lycée Henri IV and Lycée Louis-le-Grand also select high school students on application with a very low acceptance rate making them the two only public institutions in Paris working this way. This process is being accused of elitism and some projects suggest abolishing it.

== See also ==
- Clarendon schools, a somewhat equivalent concept in the UK
- Golden triangle, sometimes referred to as Loxbridge: an unofficial grouping of Oxford, Cambridge and certain elite universities in London
- Big Three, a historical unofficial grouping of three elite universities in the United States
- Ivy League, an unofficial grouping of eight elite universities in the United States
- SKY, the 3 elite universities of Korea
