= Bǔ kè =

Extra classes and private tutoring test prep in China

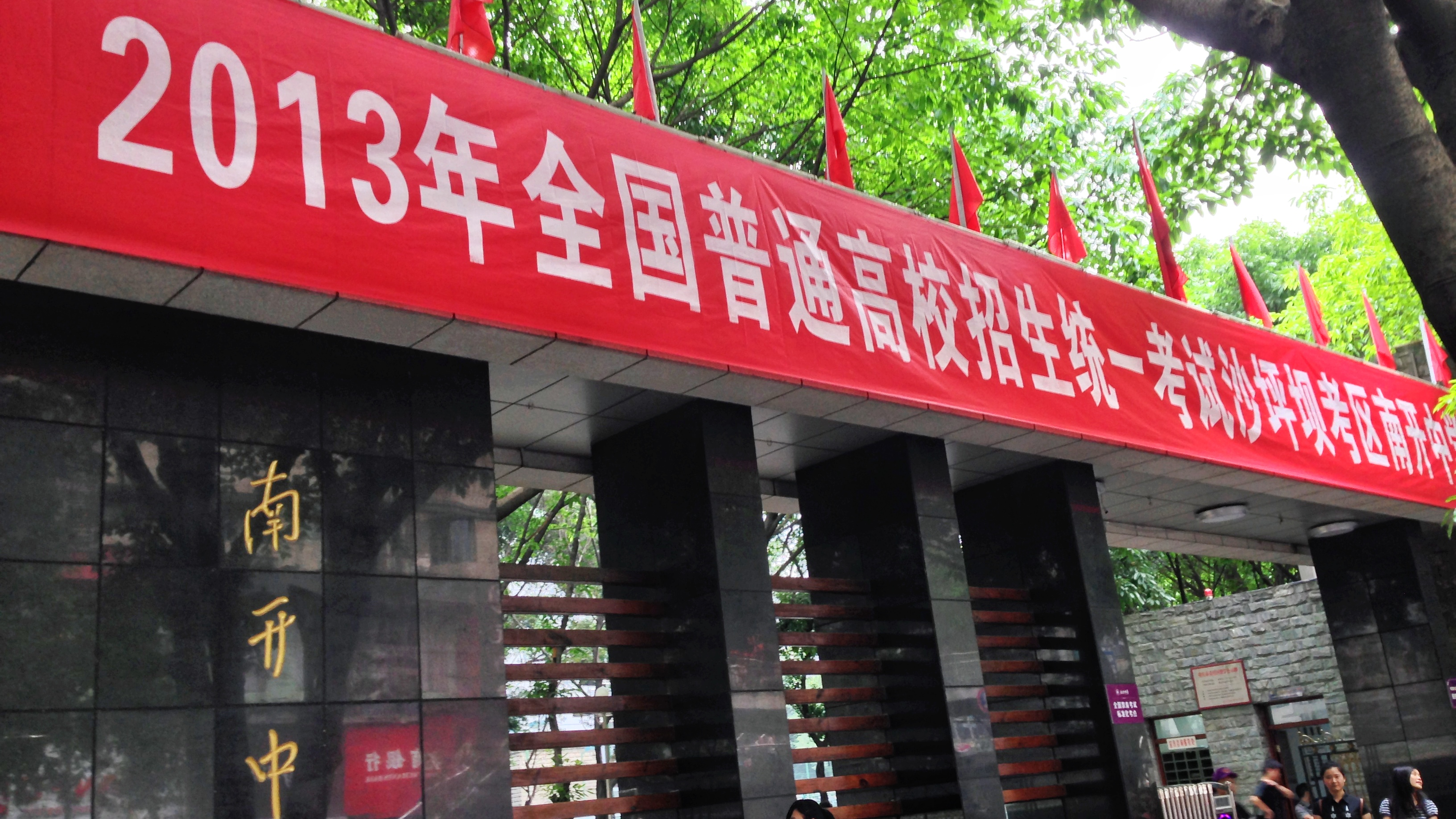
- Buke prepares students for the National Higher Education Entrance Examination. A 2013 banner at Chongqing Nankai Secondary School announcing it as an examination venue.
- Chinese: 补课
Transcriptions
Standard Mandarin
- Hanyu Pinyin: bǔ kè

Buke (Chinese: 补课; pinyin: bǔ kè) in the high schools of mainland China refers to the social phenomenon of extra study for the improvement of students’ academic performance in the Chinese National Higher Education Entrance Examination (commonly known as Gaokao). This extra study is usually in the form of extra mandatory classes organized by high schools, or private tutoring provided by cram schools.

== Types ==
Generally, Buke in high schools of mainland China are of two types:

- Extra mandatory classes. In most cases, high schools arrange such classes for students on weekends and holidays, which may follow the ordinary schedule; or in some areas, students will be asked to study in school for extended hours. In a typical Chinese test-prep factory, Maotanchang High School, students will have their three-hour free time on Sunday afternoon every week ).
- Cram school. The main feature of private tutoring is that it is optional, depending on factors such as personal willingness, study situations, and family economic conditions. Yu (2012) suggests that private tutoring mainly consists of three forms “(a) one-to-one private tutoring, (b) small groups of students with one tutor, and (c) private tutoring in a large class setting.”

== Background ==
China has an examination-oriented educational system and result-oriented educational ideology. A student's score in Gaokao is the main standard for admission to university, and the competition has intensified over the years. Being admitted to a top-class university is considered as the ultimate success for students, at least in teachers' and parents' views. Students, parents, teachers, and schools all want to improve the students’ score in any possible ways, including extra classes either in school or in private institution. Another factor is the unbalanced distribution of educational resources. High schools vary in quality. Lower-level schools lack outstanding teachers, while private educational institutions provide opportunities for students to get a higher quality education.

== Related legislation ==
Almost every year, the Ministry of Education of the People's Republic of China issues official documents which emphasize the prohibition of any forms of Buke organized by state-run schools. In Opinions Concerning the Implementation of the Compulsory Education Law to further regulate which was issued after the emendation of the Compulsory Education Law in 2006, the Ministry of Education points out that it is banned for teachers in state-run schools to encourage either intramural or extramural Buke. Teacher participation in the extramural Buke in their part-time is also strongly opposed.

Despite the prohibition of Buke by state-run schools, there is no national regulation for Buke organized by private schools or educational establishments. However, the regulations made by some local governments at different levels did affect them. In February 2015, Wenzhou City Board of Education issued Disposal Options of Wenzhou for Primary and Secondary School Teachers in Paid Buke, for teacher's attendance in paid Buke is officially considered unprofessional conduct. For the first time, this regulation related to teachers in private-run primary and secondary schools, hence it is called “the toughest regulation on Buke”. According to a clerk working in an educational establishment, the teachers in Wenzhou no longer attend extramural Buke after the implementation of the disposal options.

== Debate ==
While some parents, students, and educators support buke for the opportunity to retain learning through holidays and to work out difficult problems for which there is no time during normal classes, others oppose the practice as overly stressing academic performance and increasing stress on students.

== See also ==
- Cram schools
  - Buxiban
  - Hagwon
  - Juku
- Exams
  - High School Graduation Examination - Vietnam
- Students
  - Dek siw
  - Jaesusaeng
  - Rōnin (student)
