= Rōnin (student) =

Student who failed school entrance exams and is studying to retake them

In contemporary Japanese slang, a rōnin (浪人) is a student who has graduated from middle school or high school but has failed to achieve admission to a desired school or even any school at the next level, and consequently is studying outside of the school system for admission in the next year. Rōnin may study at a yobikō. The equivalent term in Korean education is jaesusaeng.

== Etymology ==
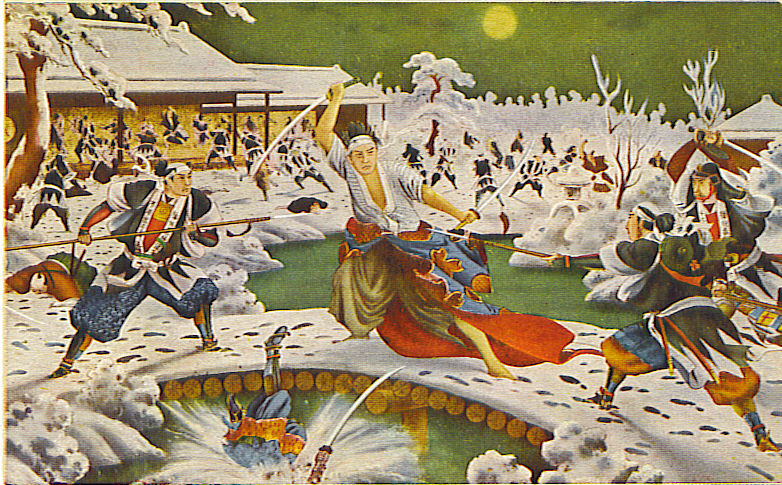
Historical depiction of Rōnin

The term rōnin is colloquial while the word kanendosei (過年度生) is more formal. The term derives from their having no school to attend, as a rōnin, a masterless samurai, had no leader to serve.

Now adapted into contemporary Japanese slang, a rōnin (浪人) is a student who has graduated from middle school or high school but has failed to achieve admission to a desired school or even any school at the next level, and consequently is studying outside of the school system for admission in the next year.

Rōnin may study at a yobikō or other shadow or supplementary education institutions to aid their studying when retaking their admission examinations.

Sometimes, the terms short form (二浪), full form (二年浪人), or second year (二年 –) are used for students who failed exams twice.

== History ==
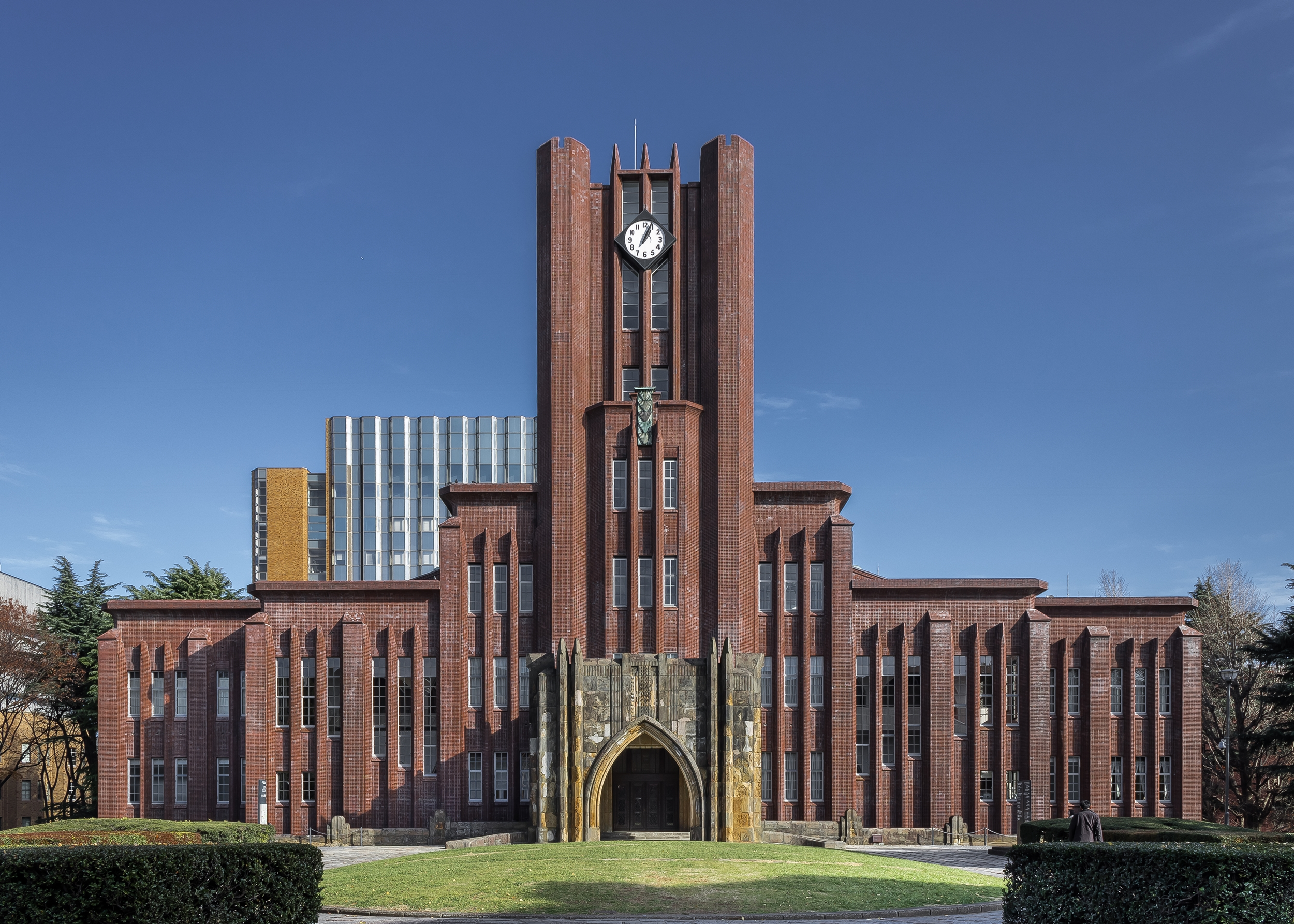
The University of Tokyo, one of Japan's most prestigious universities

Society in Japan has developed to value social status, and changes in social status are believed to only be possible through the attendance of prestigious universities, such as the University of Tokyo and Kyoto University. The large number of individuals opting to become rōnin reflects their desire to enhance their chances of gaining admission to such prestigious institutions. This additional study period enables rōnin to meet societal and parental expectations related to educational achievement.

Parental pressure plays a large part in influencing the need for academic success in Japanese students, since they want their children to succeed. This led to students becoming rōnin and attending shadow or supplementary education institutions like yobikō in order to improve their chances of attending prestigious universities. Students usually choose to become rōnin based on the expectations placed on them by their parents and greater society. A rōnin may also be influenced to choose this path because of the economic benefits that having a prestigious education will grant them later on.

The Japanese education system is very competitive due to the existence of rōnin, and the entrance exams to enter these universities are rigorous. There is now a concept called 'examination hell' which refers to the period when rōnin undergo intense periods of studying in preparation for university entrance exams. Being a rōnin for too long has negative impacts, specifically regarding social expectations on the appropriate age to finalize your education and begin to enter the workforce.

Rōnin significantly influence the quality of education and universities in Japan. Their rigorous preparation not only enhances their personal academic performance and prospects of attending prestigious universities but also raises the average academic standards among all applicants. This elevation in applicants' academic standards boosts the reputation of each university, thereby increasing the overall appeal and competitiveness of higher education in Japan.

== Social context ==
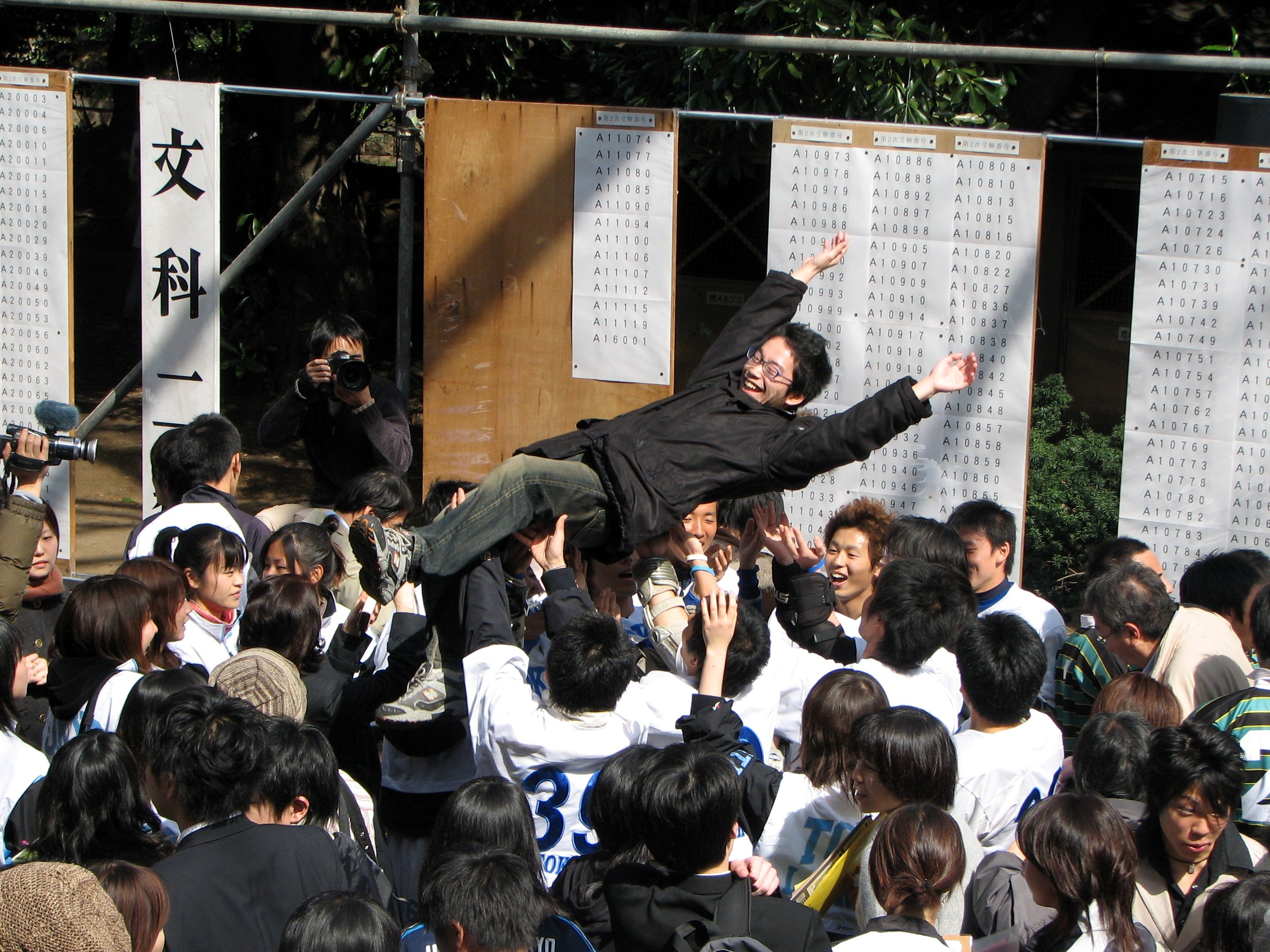
Students checking their University of Tokyo entrance exam results

Rōnin who studied more are also more likely to have increased their academic knowledge, so those attending these universities are at a higher educational standard than previously.

However, eventually the benefits to being a rōnin end. This is because there is only so much preparation to be done prior to entrance exams, even with shadow education.

A large majority of rōnin participate in supplementary education in order to benefit their studying and preparation for entrance exams. These institutions have been found to disproportionately benefit higher socioeconomic class students for many reasons. One is that access to these institutions is limited to those with the financial resources to access them. Graduates from upper-class high schools also tend to choose becoming rōnin rather than enter less prestigious universities since they know they will have the support of supplementary education to guide their studies.

There are higher rates of rōnin from upper-class high schools for this reason and since their families have better access to information about supplementary education options. Rōnin from different socioeconomic classes have similar opinions on what the negatives of being rōnin are, but differ greatly on the positive aspects as a result of the opportunities higher-class rōnin know they will be able to access for support.

Prestige of high school compared to yobikō rank
High school:
yobikō class	A	B	C	D	E	Total
Rank 1	44.7%	41.5%	16.7%	02.1%	00.3%	09.9%
Rank 2	44.7%	32.3%	44.4%	22.5%	15.8%	08.4%
Rank 3	04.0%	13.9%	25.6%	22.8%	21.0%	11.7%
Rank 4	06.6%	12.3%	13.3%	40.0%	39.1%	37.1%
Rank 5	00.0%	00.0%	00.0%	12.6%	23.3%	32.9%

(In this table, the high schools are labeled A through E based on prestige, with A being highest and E being lowest)

This table shows how many rōnin from five different high schools in Japan attended different ranks of supplementary education classes in a yobikō. The data collected shows that the higher the prestige of high school, which is typically attended by the upper-class, had more attendance in higher ranked supplementary education classes.

== In popular culture ==
Rōnin appear frequently in fiction and Japanese popular culture. As an example, the manga and anime series Love Hina features three main characters, Keitaro Urashima, Naru Narusegawa, and Mutsumi Otohime, who are described as rōnin throughout most of the series. In the manga and anime series Chobits, the protagonist, Hideki Motosuwa, is a rōnin studying at a preparatory school to get into college. Maison Ikkoku also features a rōnin as its main character; the series centers around his studying for exams as he is distracted by others that he lives with. The protagonist of Sekirei, Minato Sahashi, is also a rōnin. Kanamemo's Hinata Azuma is a rōnin as well due to her love of gambling and money making, activities which hinder her studies.

== See also ==
- Bǔ kè – Extra classes and private tutoring test prep in China
- Dek siw – Student preparing to retake university entrance exam
- Hikikomori – Reclusive adolescents or adults
- NEET – Person who is not in education, employment, or training
- Jaesusaeng – South Korean term for students retaking school examinations
