= Cram school =

School focused on preparing for entrance exams

A cram school (colloquially: crammer, test prep, tuition center, or exam factory) is a specialized school that trains its students to achieve particular goals, most commonly to pass the entrance examinations of high schools or universities. The English name is derived from the slang term cramming, meaning to study a large amount of material in a short period of time.

== Education ==
Cram schools may specialize in a particular subject or subjects, or may be aligned with particular schools. Special cram schools that prepare students to re-take failed entrance examinations are also common. As the name suggests, the aim of a cram school is generally to impart as much information to its students as possible in the shortest period of time. The goal is to enable the students to obtain a required grade in particular examinations, or to satisfy other entrance requirements such as language skill (e.g.: IELTS).

== In Asia ==
=== Bangladesh ===
In Bangladesh, cram schools are known as "coaching centers" and in some cases, "tutorials". Most cram schools provide help for admission tests of public universities and medical colleges like BUET, CUET, RUET, KUET, Universities of Dhaka, Chittagong, Rajshahi and Jahangirnagar, medical colleges etc., and public examinations like PSC, JSC, SSC, and HSC. They are also available for preparing for different high school admission tests, including the Cadet Colleges and other renowned institutions. There are also some variants which have entered the market of ever-increasing help seekers. For example, cram schools now also prepare students for language tests like IELTS and TOEFL, aptitude tests like GRE, GMAT, SAT, and so on. In recent years, cram schools have also been extended to the tests for government civil services like BCS Examination.

=== China ===
In China, cram schools are called Buxiban (traditional Chinese: 補習班; simplified Chinese: 补习班; pinyin: Bǔxíbān). They are related to the improvement of students’ performance on the National Higher Education Entrance Examination (Gaokao). Historically, they were designed for students who were behind and had trouble matching the pace of traditional schools. Newer types of cram school say their educational purpose is to train the reasoning ability (siwei 思维) of students.

Examinations like the National Higher Education Entrance Examination (Gaokao) are vital, deciding the academic future of participants. The tuition fees for cram schools are expensive. Cram schools exist due to the importance of standardized exams, such as:

- High school entrance exam (HEE) after junior high, at 9th year of school
- The National Higher Education Entrance Examination, or 高考
- Academic Olympics Competitions
- Other exams such as TOEFL/GRE, IELTS and SAT

=== Hong Kong ===
Cram schools in Hong Kong are called tutorial schools. These cram schools put focus on the major public examinations in Hong Kong, namely HKDSE, and teach students on techniques on answering questions in the examinations. They also provide students tips on which topics may appear on the coming examination (called "question tipping"), and provide students some sample questions that are similar to those that appear in the examinations. Some cram school teachers in Hong Kong have become idolized and attract many students to take their lessons. These teachers are called "King of tutors (補習天王)". English and math are the most common subjects taught in Hong Kong cram schools.

Cram schools in Hong Kong are famous because of the stresses from Hong Kong Diploma of Secondary Education (HKDSE). These cram school teaching includes practicing exam questions and grammar drills. Moreover, they provide model essays for English language exam. However, some schools are not licensed, and few educators have teaching qualifications.

=== India ===
Numerous cram schools—referred to as coaching centers/institutes, tutorials/tuitions, dummy schools or classes in India—have sprung up all over the nation, providing a de facto parallel education system, with cram school programs marketed as effectively mandatory to be a part of, to be accepted into a proper college. They aim to tutor students to pass schools and college exams and getting their clients through various competitive exams to enter prestigious institutions such as the Indian Institutes of Technology for engineering courses the All India Institutes of Medical Sciences for medical courses at the undergraduate, postgraduate levels and the National Law Universities for legal and judicial courses and UPSC to become successful IAS and IPS officers.

Many such schools prepare students to crack prestigious national entrance/scholarship exams at the high school level such as JEE (Joint Entrance Examination) Main & Advanced to enter prestigious engineering colleges like the IITs, NEET-UG (National Eligibility cum Entrance Test – Undergraduate level) for entrance into major medical science undergraduate programs and Common Law Admission Test (CLAT) for entering into premier law schools of the country.

Initiatives like the National Level Common Entrance Examination (NLCEE) complement these efforts by organizing scholarship exams and exposure programs, which provide students with career guidance and visits to premier institutions like IITs. Such initiatives aim to help students make informed decisions, reducing the stress and uncertainty often associated with competitive exams.

Various such exams are held for entering fields such as scientific research, engineering, medicine, management, accountancy, law and also into India's premier central and state government services organized by UPSC, SSC etc.

=== Indonesia ===
Cram schools in Indonesia are called bimbingan belajar (learning assistance), often shortened into bimbel, and accepts students preparing for National Examinations before passing elementary school, junior high school, high school and college entrance exams. These cram schools teach students with exam simulations and problem-solving tutorials. Usually, these cram schools teach students by past exam questions. Bimbels in Indonesia offer lessons after school hours, weekends or public holidays.

=== Japan ===
It is a large industry in Japan and caters to all types of school tests preparations, from kindergarten to high school graduation; it began growing rapidly in the 1970s. At that time, the number of universities was small, but college competition was intensive because almost 95% of students graduated from high school. In addition, Japan had the highest achievement test scores in the world from the 1980s to 2000, causing the cram school industry to grow. The cram schools, called juku, are privately owned, and offer lessons conducted after regular school hours, on weekends, and during summer and winter breaks.

=== Malaysia ===
In Malaysia, it is considered a norm for parents, especially those from the middle and upper class, to send schoolchildren for private tuition. Such services are often provided by tuition centers and/or private tutors. These tutors may be full-time tutors, schoolteachers, retirees, or even senior students. Many concerned parents choose to send their children to different tuition classes or schedules based on the child's entrance examination subjects. Some students may go to tuition for their weaker subjects, while many schoolchildren are increasingly known to attend at least 10 hours of private tuition every week. Correspondingly, the reputation and business of a tuition center often depends on venue, schedule, number of top-scoring clients, and advertizing by word of mouth. It is not uncommon for private tutors to offer exclusive pre-examination seminars, to the extent where some tutors entice schoolchildren to attend such seminars with the promise of examination tips, or even supposedly leaked examination questions.

=== Pakistan ===
Prevalent from elementary school to secondary education in Pakistan, afterschool tuiton centers, also called "academies," are quickly becoming a norm for middle and upper class families. Tuiton centers have been criticized for adding additional pressure on students, eroding the quality of public and private school education as qualified teachers enter tuition centers for better pay, and exacerbating wealth inequality in access to education, leaving low-income families unable to afford alternatives.

=== Philippines ===
In the Philippines, cram schools are usually called "review centers" or "review schools". They are often attended by students in order to study for and pass college and university entrance examinations, or to pass licensure examinations such as the Philippine Bar Examination, Licensure Examination for Professional Teachers, the Philippine Physician Licensure Examination, or the Philippine Nurse Licensure Examination.

=== Singapore ===
In Singapore, it is very common for students in the local education system to be enrolled in cram schools, better known locally as tuition centers. Enrollment in these after-school tuition centers is extremely high, especially for students bound for national exams, such as the Primary School Leaving Examination (PSLE), GCE O Levels, or the GCE A Levels. Students attending tuition centers on a daily basis is not unheard of in Singapore.

=== South Korea ===
Although the South Korean educational system has been criticized internationally for its stress and competitiveness, it remains common for South Korean students to attend one or more cram schools ("hagwons") after their school-day is finished, most students studying there until 10 P.M. Some types of cram schools include math, science, art, and English. English language institutes along with math are particularly popular. Certain places, such as Gangnam in Seoul, are well known for having a lot of hagwons. Because of hagwons, many Koreans have voiced complaints about how public education is falling behind in terms of quality compared to private education, creating a gap between students who can afford the expensive hagwon tuition fee and those who cannot. Today, it is almost mandatory for Korean students to attend one or more hagwons in order to achieve high results on a test.

South Korean students have two big tests per semester: midterms and finals. They just have written tests in those subjects. A distinct feature of the cramming teaching method in Korea is extra preparation for these tests, ranging from tests from previous years and other schools to various prep books made by different education companies. These test preparation periods normally start a month before the test date. After school, generally, most students go to hagwons to supplement what they learned from the teachers who provide knowledge to the students. Students memorize for tests, and go to hagwons for high grades.

The Korean College Scholastic Ability Test, the standardized college entrance examination commonly referred to as the suneung, also plays a large part in why so many students attend hagwons. However, unlike midterms and finals, many high school students also prepare for the suneung through online video lessons on websites that specialize in suneung preparation.

=== Taiwan ===
Cram schools in Taiwan are called supplementary classes (補習班), and are not necessarily cram schools in the traditional sense. Almost any kind of extracurricular academic lesson such as music, art, math, and physics can be termed as such, even if students do not attend these classes specifically in order to pass an examination. It's a traditional belief that parents should send their children to all kinds of cram schools in order to compete against other talented children. Therefore, most children in Taiwan have a schedule packed with all sorts of cram school lessons. But when they study English, often with a "Native Speaker Teacher", they are actually studying at a private language school. Furthermore, since this study is ongoing, they are not "cramming" in the traditional sense of the word, and therefore, these language schools are not cram schools by strict definition.

Taiwan is well known for its cram schools. Nearly all students attend some kind of cram school to improve their skills. The meritocratic culture, which requires some skills testing for passports to college, graduate school, and even government service, is dominant on Taiwan's policy.

=== Thailand ===
Cram schooling in Thailand has become almost mandatory to succeed in high school or in the entrance examinations of universities. Cram schools in Thailand, which are called tutoring institutes, tutoring schools, special tutoring, or special classes for example, are widespread throughout the country. Some of them do not have instructors in class rooms in a traditional sense; students receive their tuition via television network, which can either relay a live session from another branch or replay a pre-recorded session. Parents generally encourage their children to attend these schools and they sometimes can be perceived as pushy. The system of cram school is currently blamed for discouraging pupils from independent studies.

The main reason given by attending students is to increase understanding in their lessons. The secondary reason of junior high school students is to want to know faster techniques whereas the reason of senior ones is to prepare for exam. The most attended subjects are mathematics for juniors and English language for seniors. Average expense per course is about 2,001–3,000 baht.

Most of the students in the top universities of Thailand have attended at least one cram class, especially in science-based faculties such as science, engineering, medicine, and pharmacy.

Dek siw, those who failed in their first year, spend the whole following year studying at home or at a cram school for a better chance of going to a top university like Chulalongkorn University, Thammasart University, Kasetsart University, Mahidol University, or King Mongkut's University of Technology Thonburi.

== In Europe and Australia ==
=== Australia ===
Cram schools are referred to largely as "coaching colleges" or "tuition centres". They are used primarily to achieve the necessary results for the entrance exam for highly competitive selective schools in New South Wales and Victoria. They are also used extensively in English, mathematics and science courses for the Higher School Certificate, Victorian Certificate of Education, and other high school subjects in the final years of schooling.

=== France ===
The national exam (baccalauréat) ending high-school is easy to obtain (the success rate is about 90%), and the grades obtained matter relatively little (most higher education schools choose their students before the baccalauréat results, based on grades during high school). Thus, baccalauréat cram schools are rare. Individual tutoring is more common.

After the baccalauréat, about 5% of the French students attend the selective Classes Préparatoires aux Grandes Écoles (prep school) or CPGE. These two-year programs are meant to prepare undergrad students to the entrance exams of high-profile graduate schools (Grandes écoles) in science, engineering and business — including École Normale Supérieure, HEC Paris, EDHEC, ESCP, EM Lyon, ESSEC, École polytechnique, Arts et Métiers ParisTech, Télécom Paris, École des Ponts, CentraleSupélec, École des Mines, and ISAE-SUPAERO. A large proportion of CPGE are public schools, with very small tuition fees. There are about 400 CPGE schools for 869 classes, including about 58 private schools. They have produced most of France's scientists, intellectuals, and executives during the last two centuries.

French prep schools are characterized by heavy workload and very high demands, varying however between schools. Programs are heavier than the first two years in public universities, covering several majors (for example Maths and Physics). Students in CPGE have between 36 and 40 hours of class a week, as well as one or more weekly 2-to-4 hours written test on each major (often also on Saturday). Students are expected to work on their own at least 2 hours a day, while the most ambitious students can work more than 5 hours every evening after classes, as well as during the weekend and holidays. Moreover, students have to take what is called "colles" (or "khôlles") mainly 2 times a week, which are oral interrogations. For science topics, it consists of an hour-long session where a group of typically 3 students, each on a board, and dealing with a question related to a specific lesson (e.g. a demonstration of a theorem) and/or exercises. The teacher listens to, assists and corrects the students, then grades them. Khôlles on languages (e.g. English) consists in a 30 minutes test: first listening to an audio or studying a newspaper article and summarizing it, and then writing a short essay on the theme. Everything is then presented orally to the teacher. Literacy khôlles often consist in preparing and presenting an essay.

Entrance competitive exams to the "Grandes Ecoles" consist in written and oral exams. For scientific branches, a project involving research-oriented works has to be prepared. Written exams are typically 4h-long sets of exercises and problems built around a specific topic (which often can't be fully treated in the given amount of time), and require both reasoning and raw knowledge. Oral exams are often similar to khôlles.

This is a two-year track. In most schools, only the second year is explicitly focused on entrance exams preparation. If a student could not obtain the school(s) they wanted, they can repeat the second year.

There are three main branches :

- Scientific branch study mainly math, physics and chemistry, IT, industrial sciences, biology and earth sciences. Sub-branches are : math-physics, physics-chemistry, physics-industrial sciences, and biology-earth sciences. Many French research scientists went through scientific CPGE.
- Economics/business branch (often called "Prépa HEC") study mainly social sciences, economy, math and languages. Many important French public figures and politicians went through this way. Sub-branches specialize in math/economics, economics/social sciences, or management.
- Humanities branch (called Khâgne) study mainly philosophy, literature, foreign and ancient languages, history. Sub-branches specialize in social sciences or literature.

The tracks and schools are known for their folklore (slang terms, songs and hymns, anecdotes), and often inherited from early 19th-century generations of students.

=== Greece ===
Φροντιστήρια (from φροντίζω, to take care of) have been a permanent fixture of the Greek educational system for several decades. They are considered the norm for learning foreign languages (English language learning usually starts during the elementary school years) and for having a chance to pass the university entrance examinations. The preparation for the country-wide university entrance examinations practically takes up the two last years of upper high school, and the general view is that the amount of relevant school hours is insufficient for the hard competition, regardless of the teachers' abilities. This leads to students taking state school lessons from 08.15 to 14.00 at school, going home for lunch, continue for two or three hours in the cramming school and returning to prepare the homework both for state school and "frontistirio". In the weekend, the students usually have lessons in the cramming school on Saturday morning and on Sunday morning revision tests. Unhired teachers by the state find a way to employment through these private businesses.

These two popular views pave the ground for the abundant number of cram schools, also attended by numerous high school students for general support of their performance.

=== Ireland ===
"Grind schools", as they are known in the Republic of Ireland, prepare students for the Leaving Certificate examination. Competition for university places (the "points race") has intensified with recent years: students wishing to study medicine, law or veterinary science in particular aim to achieve high points (up to 625) to be accepted. Some grind schools, such as The Institute of Education, Ashfield College, Leinster Senior College, The Dublin Academy of Education and Bruce College, teach full-time. Many others offer weekend or evening classes for students in subjects in which they struggle.

=== Turkey ===
The dershane (plural, dershaneler) system was the Turkish counterpart of cram schools. The Turkish dershane system resembles Indian and Japanese systems. Students, typically after school and on weekends (especially during the last year), are drilled on various aspects of the Higher Education Institutions Examination (YKS). This is cheaper than private tutoring.

The dershanes were closed due to the AKP-Gülen movement conflict after the AKP government banned them due to the Gülenists being politically active in dershanes. A similar network of cram schools are still active with different names, although still colloquially termed as dershane.

=== United Kingdom ===
Crammers first appeared in Britain after 1855 when the Civil Service Commission created the Administrative class of government employees, selected by examination and interview rather than patronage. Crammers offered to prepare men of 18 to 25 years old for these examinations, mainly in classics, economics and foreign languages, which would provide entry to civil service or diplomatic careers. The opening scenes of Benjamin Britten's 1971 television opera Owen Wingrave, and the 1892 novella by Henry James on which it is based, are set in a military crammer; its master plays an important role in both. Terence Rattigan's 1936 play French Without Tears is set in a language crammer typical of the period. These civil service crammers did not survive the Second World War.

Tutorial colleges in the United Kingdom are also called "crammers", and are attended by some who want to attend the most prestigious universities. They have been around since the early 20th century.

== In North and South America ==
=== Brazil ===
Cram schools are called "Cursinhos" (lit. Little Courses) in Brazil and are attended by students who will be taking a vestibular exam to be admitted into a university.

=== Chile ===
Cram schools are called "Preuniversitarios" in Chile, and are attended by students before taking PAES (Superior Education Entrance Test) in order to get onto undergraduate studies.

=== Peru ===
In Peru, cram schools, known as "Academias", are institutions which intensively prepare, in about a year, high school graduates to gain admission to either University ("Academia Pre Universitaria"), or Military Schools ("Academia Pre-Militar"). Cram Schools in Peru are not an admission requirement to enter any tertiary institution; however, due to fierce competition, preparation in a cram school allows the candidate to achieve the highest grade possible in the entry exam and so gain entry to their desired Tertiary Institution. Cram Schools are independent of universities, however, of recent a post-high-school, pre-university school has started at some public and private universities in Peru. Under the name of CEntro PREuniversitario (name or acronym of university, for instance CEPREUNI or CEPREPUCP, after Universidad Nacional de Ingenieria or Pontificia Universidad Catolica del Peru, commonly referred to as "the CEPRE" or "the PRE"). Some of these CEPREs offer automatic admission to their university to their students who reach a set level of achievement

=== United States ===
A number of businesses, called "tutoring services" or "test preparation centers", are colloquially known as cram schools. They are used by some GED candidates, and by some third and fourth year students in high schools to prepare for the SAT, ACT, and/or Advanced Placement exams for college admission. Their curriculum is geared more towards vocabulary drills, problem sets, practicing essay composition, and learning effective test-taking strategies. College graduates and undergraduates near graduation will sometimes attend such classes to prepare for entrance exams necessary for graduate level education (i.e. LSAT, DAT, MCAT, GRE).

== See also ==
- Storefront school
- Test preparation
