= Ashfield College =

Private 5th and 6th year school, Dundrum, Dublin, Ireland

Location
- Sandyford Road, Dundrum, Dublin; Ireland; 53.2866°N 6.2395°W

Information
- Type: Private
- Established: 1977
- Principal: Louise Heeran Flynn
- Teaching staff: 16
- Grades: 5th and 6th year
- Owner: City Education Group
- Website: www.ashfieldcollege.ie

Ashfield College is a private post-primary school located in Dundrum in Dublin, Ireland. Originally founded in 1977, the school was previously based in Templeogue.

Ashfield College offers preparation for the Leaving Certificate examination, both as a two-year leaving certificate senior cycle, but also as a one-year (Repeat Leaving Cert.) programme. The school also caters for overseas students wishing to study in Ireland for the Irish leaving certificate. 21 Leaving Certificate subjects are taught at the school, and students can access course material, including recorded lectures online. As well as more common subjects for the Leaving Cert, some less common leaving cert subjects of Arabic, Agricultural Science and Classical Studies are also available at Ashfield. The school offers a career guidance service to students with advice on academic and career issues, such as advice on completing the Irish CAO college application process or the UK UCAS system.

The school also provides tuition programmes at weekends and in the evenings for students sitting the Leaving Certificate and Junior Certificate, also during mid-term, Christmas and Easter school holidays intense revision courses are available. Before the start of the school year, there is a Pre-Leaving Cert preparation course run, this is a week where students can enroll to improve their ability in a subject or subjects which they will be studying for in the leaving cert. The college also offers grinds in some Junior Certificate subjects, such as English, Irish and Mathematics.

A "Christmas Intensive Revision Course", for Leaving and Junior Cert, takes place in the first week of January. An "Easter Revision" exam preparation course take place over the Easter school holidays.

Ashfield College also offers a number of adult education courses.

== See also ==
- Ormonde Education Group
- City Colleges
