= Alexandre Rousselin de Saint-Albin =

French politician

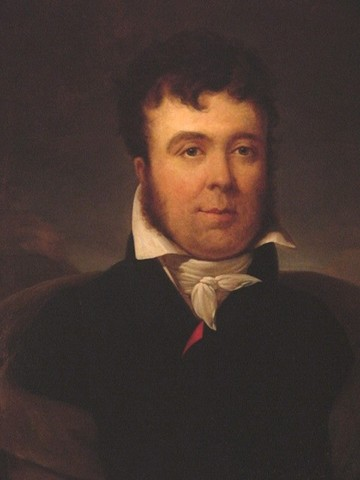
Alexandre Rousselin picture

Alexander Charles Omer Rousselin de Corbeau, comte de Saint Albin (1773–1847) was a French politician.

Born in Paris, of an aristocratic family from the Dauphiné, Rousselin de Saint-Albin was educated at the Collège d'Harcourt. He embraced the ideas of the French Revolution with enthusiasm, sympathised with the Jacobin Club, and later edited the journal Feuille du salut public. As civil commissioner in Troyes, he was accused by some of enforcing the Reign of Terror, and by the Revolutionary Tribunal of being a moderate, and he was imprisoned for a short time in 1794.

On his release from the Citoyen during the Thermidorian Reaction, Rousselin held offices in the Ministry of the Interior, and under the Directory he became secretary-general, and then civil commissioner of the Seine département. Attached to the party of Jean-Baptiste Bernadotte, he was looked on with suspicion by the police of the First French Empire, and during the later years of the Empire spent his time in retirement at Provence. During the Hundred Days, however, he served under Lazare Carnot at the Ministry of the Interior.

Under the Bourbon Restoration he defended Liberal principles in the Constitutionnel, of which he was the founder. Although Louis Philippe had been his friend since the days of 1789, he accepted no office from the July Monarchy. He retired from the Constitutionnel in 1838, and died nine years later.

== Works ==
His chief literary works deal with the soldiers of the French Revolutionary Wars:

- Vie de Lazare Hoche, général des armées de la République française (2 vols., 1798)
- Notice historique sur le général Marbot (1800); M. de Championnel (1860)
- Notices of others were posthumously published by his son, Hortensius Rousselin de Corbeau de Saint-Albin, as Documents relatifs à la Revolution Française (1873).
