= City Colleges =

Private third-level institution in Dublin, Ireland

Coordinates: 53.344184°N 6.263360°W

City College Dublin
- Former name: City Colleges
- Type: Private
- Established: 2011
- Parent institution: City Education Group
- President: Philip Burke
- Location: Dublin, Ireland
- Campus: Dublin, Dundrum, and online
- Website: citycollegedublin.ie

City College Dublin, formerly City Colleges, is an Irish provider of professional and academic education, based in Dublin. The institution runs degree and diploma courses in various professional fields such as in accounting (Association of Chartered Certified Accountants), business, computing, professional law, psychology, in Dublin city centre and Dundrum. The college specializes in professional education, aimed at graduates and people returning to education. It forms part of the City Education Group, which also includes the secondary school Ashfield College in Dundrum and the College of Progressive Education and City Language School in Dublin city.

Courses are delivered on campuses at South Great George's Street in Dublin and in Dundrum, as well as live online or on demand. It also offers an FE1 course, an Association of Chartered Certified Accountants course, and a selection of professional diplomas. The Law Society of Ireland entrance exams (FE1's) preparatory courses are delivered twice per year commencing in June and November annually.

The college has more than 100 courses taught in thematic areas of business, information technology, psychology, criminology, law, media, arts and sciences. It also offers accredited professional diploma courses.
