= Lycée Saint-Louis =

Post-secondary school in Paris

Location
- 44 Boulevard Saint-Michel; 75006 Paris; France
- Coordinates: 48°50′58″N 2°20′29″E

Information
- Former names: Collège d'Harcourt (1280–1820); Lycée Saint-Louis (1820–present)
- Type: State-funded preparatory school
- Established: 1280; 746 years ago
- School district: Latin Quarter
- Enrollment: 1,416
- Language: French
- Mascot: Saint Louis
- Nickname: Sancto-Ludovicien
- Website: lycee-saintlouis.ac-paris.fr

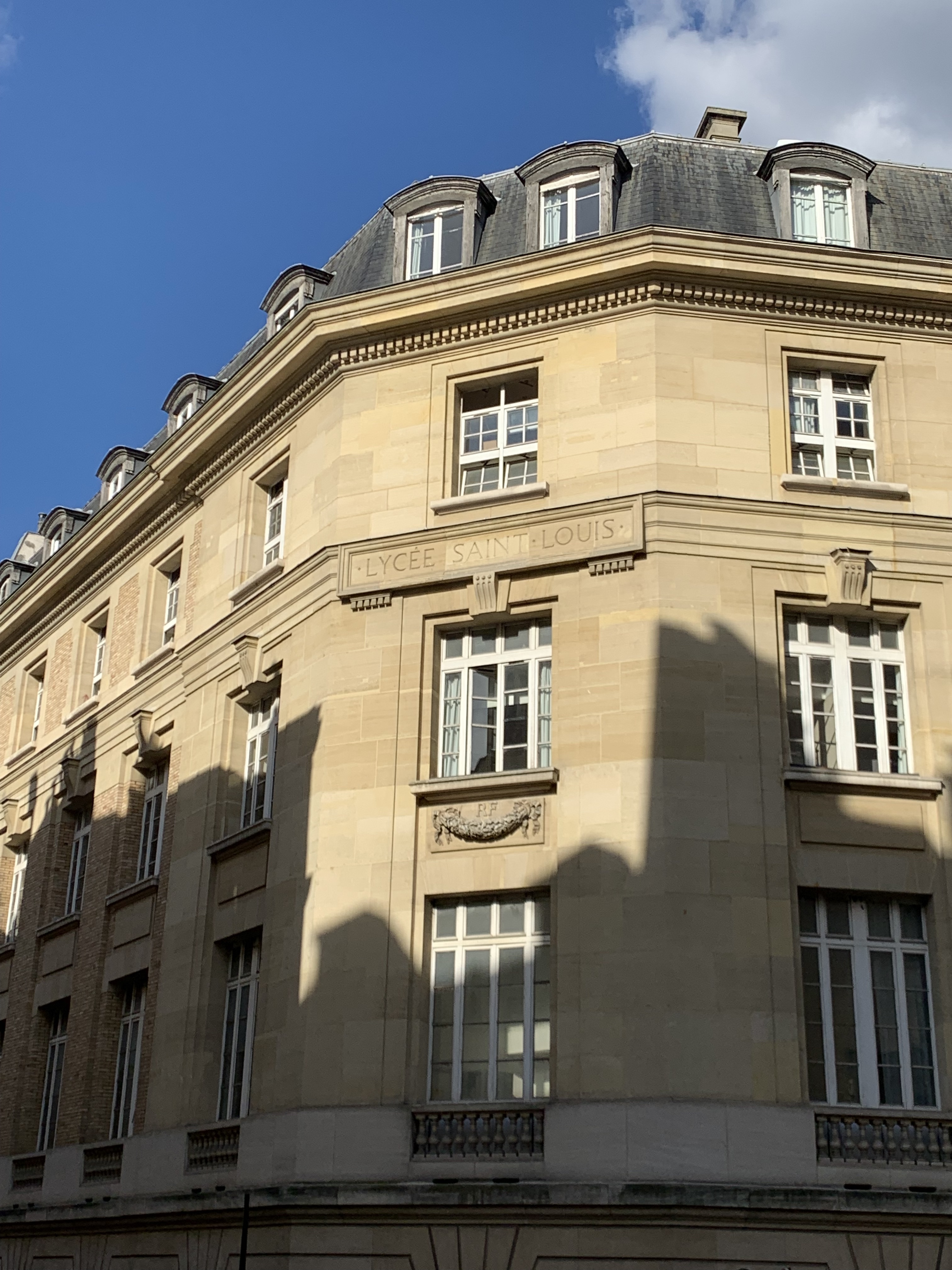
West side of the Lycée Saint-Louis, Paris VIe.

The Lycée Saint-Louis (French pronunciation: [lise sɛ̃ lwi]) is a selective post-secondary school located in the 6th arrondissement of Paris, in the Latin Quarter. It is the only state-funded French lycée that exclusively offers classes préparatoires aux grandes écoles (CPGE; preparatory classes for French top-level educational institutions).

Saint-Louis has educated many notable alumni, including five Nobel Prize laureates, one Fields Medalist, one President of France, as well as major intellectual figures such as Charles Baudelaire, Émile Zola and Louis Pasteur.

== History ==
=== Collège d'Harcourt ===
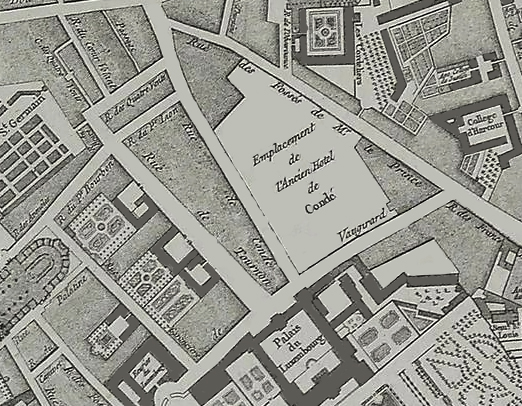
The collège d'Harcourt in a map of 1775.

The Lycée Saint-Louis, formerly known as the Collège d'Harcourt (Latin: Collegium Harcurianum), was established in 1280 by Robert and Raoul d'Harcourt with the intention of providing food and lodging to approximately forty students from disadvantaged backgrounds. From its beginning, the institution was not only a residence for students but also a centre of learning, a role that gradually gained prominence. During the Wars of Religion, it emerged as a bastion of Catholicism, prompting Henri IV to confiscate the college's assets and remove its head. Once peace returned, the king restructured the educational framework of the colleges: originally designed to educate clerics and scholars in theological disciplines, the Collège d'Harcourt was transformed into an establishment where the children of the gentry, the Parisian bourgeoisie and scholarship recipients from Normandy received their education.

In the 16th century, the college began to gain significant recognition. The 17th and 18th centuries saw the attendance of great historical figures such as Racine, Boileau and Perrault.

In the 18th century, the college became a bastion of Jansenists and produced several prominent philosophes and Encyclopédistes of the Enlightenment. It opposed the influence of the Jesuits in education, whose influence was centered just a few meters away at the college of Clermont.

During the turbulent 19th century, the lycée underwent a series of dramatic transformations. It was forcibly repurposed as a prison, later as a barracks, and eventually as a reformatory.

=== Lycée Saint-Louis ===
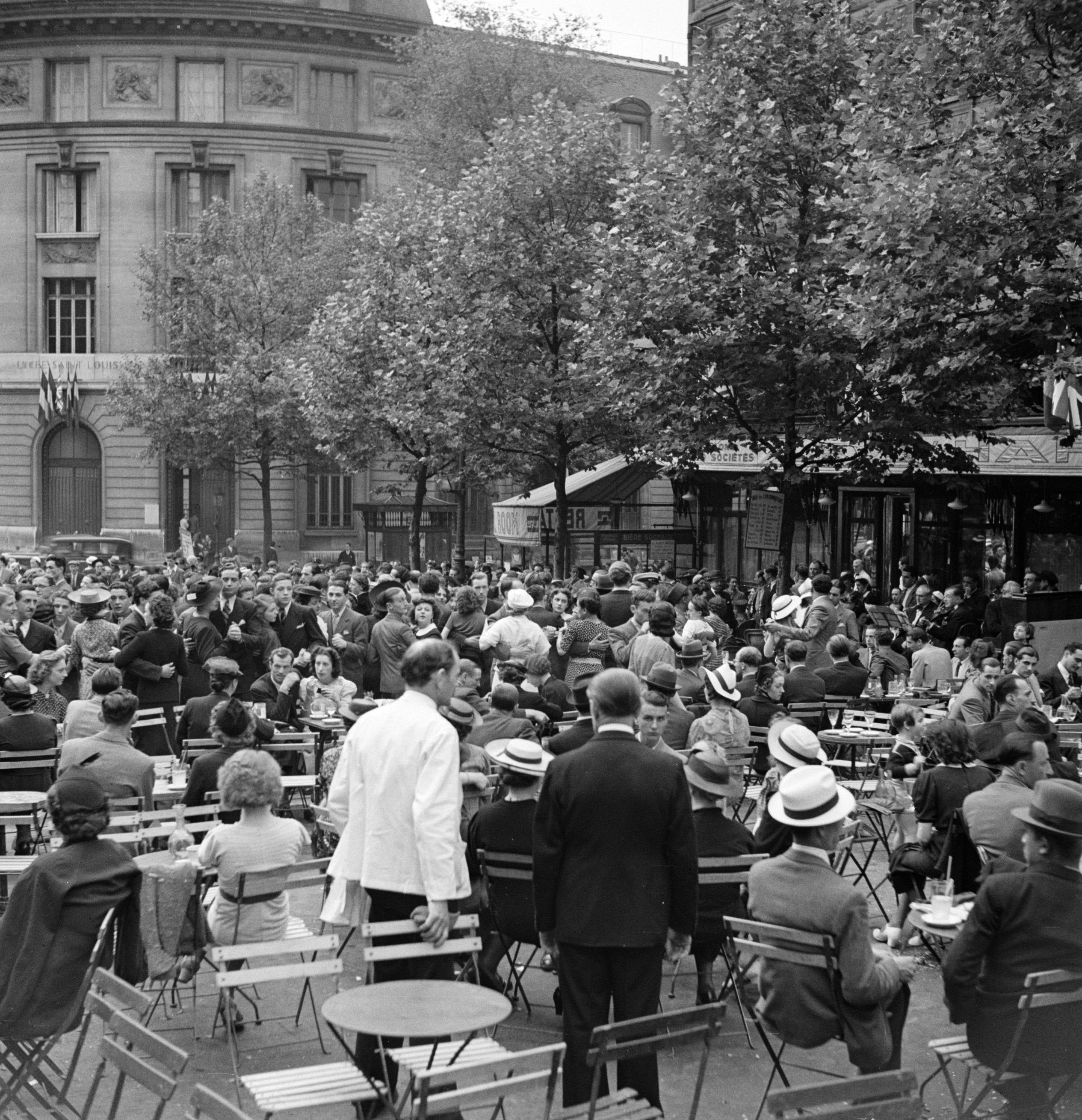
The lycée in the background on a picture from 1938 taken from the Place de la Sorbonne

In 1812, a decree from Napoleon I mandated the reopening of the Collège d'Harcourt according to the plans of J.-B. Guynet in order to accommodate an imperial lycée. However, the institution was reestablished as the "Collège Royal Saint-Louis" only in October 1820 and it resumed accepting boarders in 1823. After the French Revolution of 1830, the college briefly operated under the name "Lycée Monge" before officially becoming "Lycée Saint-Louis".

The lycée is primarily devoted to the instruction of science (since 1885, the boarding school has exclusively admitted students pursuing scientific studies). The scientific classes préparatoires aux Grandes Écoles, a programme that was established in 1866, has been the sole academic focus of the institution since the discontinuation of its high school classes in 1969. In 1843, a student from the school achieved a notable milestone by winning the first prize in mathematics at the concours général for the first time. The classes préparatoires aux Grandes Écoles prepared students to the competitive exams for the École polytechnique, the École normale supérieure (in science), Centrale, the École forestière and Saint-Cyr. In 1885, this programme was further expanded to include preparation for the École navale.

A statue of Saint Louis stands in the middle of the central courtyard. According to an old tradition now fully integrated to the school’s folklore, students admitted to Polytechnique are expected to express their gratitude to their alma mater by splashing the statue with red or yellow paint depending on whether the year is even or odd. After a few days, the statue is repainted white, a practice that explains the gradual fading of its features over time.

== Academics ==
The school offers mainly scientific courses including MPSI (Mathematics, Physics, Engineering), PCSI (Physics, Chemistry and Engineering) for the first-year students, and MP (Mathematics, Physics), PC (Physics, Chemistry), PSI (Physics, Engineering) for final-year student as well as BCPST (Biology, Chemistry, Physics, Geology). The lycée also offers courses relying heavily on Mathematics and preparing students for the highly selective French business schools; they are only intended for students who have completed a scientific Baccalauréat. The lycée Saint-Louis, like its neighbours the lycées Louis-le-Grand and Henri IV, commonly known as "the three Lycées of the Sainte-Geneviève hill", is renowned for its selectivity, the quality of its teaching and its results in the various competitive examinations.

== Campus ==
The school features a 350 m^{2} (3,800 sq ft)² library, which is accessible to both boarders and day students until 10 p.m. It also offers a mixed dormitory with 356 beds, including 234 single rooms and 61 double rooms, as well as a chapel. In addition to a dining hall, the school provides a cafeteria, and classrooms are available for student use outside their scheduled hours.

The campus is equipped with sports facilities, including a sports field and two multi-sport gymnasiums for activities such as ultimate frisbee, basketball, volleyball, and badminton. Other amenities include a gym, a billiard room, and a climbing wall. Students are required to engage in two hours of sports per week, with additional access to the sports facilities provided by the sports association at noon and in the evening.

== Notable alumni ==
- Claude Allègre - (b. 1937), former Minister, geochemist
- Charles Baudelaire - (1821–1867), writer
- Joseph Bertrand - (1822–1900), mathematician, Academician
- Nicolas Boileau-Despréaux - (1636–1711), writer, Academician
- Cahit Arf - (1910-1997), mathematician, (founder of Arf Rings)
- Paul Lévy - (1886-1971), mathematician, (founder of martingale process in probability)
- Patrice de Mac Mahon - (1808-1893), French President
- Fortuné du Boisgobey - (1821–1891), writer
- Georges Charpak - (1924–2010), physicist, Nobel Prize in Physics 1992
- Emmanuel Chabrier - (1841-1894), composer
- Abraham De Moivre - (1667-1754), mathematician, founder of De Moivre's formula
- Hubert Curien - (1924–2005), physicist, former Minister of Research
- Denis Diderot - (1713–1784), writer and philosopher
- Charles-François Dupuis - (1742–1809), author
- Pierre-Gilles de Gennes - (1932–2007), physicist, Nobel Prize in Physics 1991
- Charles Gounod - (1818–1893), composer
- Jean-Martin Charcot - (1825–1893), neurologist and professor of anatomical pathology
- Joris-Karl Huysmans - (1848–1907), novelist and art critic
- Eugène Marin Labiche - (1815–1888), dramatist
- Henri Lebesgue - (1875–1941), mathematician
- Montesquieu - (1689–1755), writer and philosopher
- Louis Néel - (1904–2000), physicist, Nobel Prize in Physics 1970
- Louis Pasteur - (1822–1895), chemist and microbiologist, Academician
- Charles Perrault - (1628–1703), writer, Academician
- Jean Racine - (1639–1699), dramatist, Academician
- Alain Robbe-Grillet - (1922–2008), writer and cinematographer, Academician
- Alexandre Rousselin de Saint-Albin - (1773–1847), politician
- Charles de Saint-Évremond - (1613–1703), writer
- Antoine de Saint-Exupéry - (1900–1944), writer and aviator
- Claude Simon - (1913–2005), writer, Nobel Prize in Literature 1985
- Charles Maurice de Talleyrand-Périgord - (1754–1838), statesman
- Yves Tanguy - (1900–1955), surrealist painter
- René Thom - (1923–2002), mathematician, Fields Medal 1958
- Ahmed Vefik Pasha - (1823–1891), Ottoman statesman, diplomat, and playwright
- André Weil - (1906–1998), mathematician
- Émile Zola - (1840–1902), writer
- Jules Massenet - (1842–1912), composer
- Jean-Luc Lagardère - (1928-2003), businessman and founder of Lagardère
- Edmond Joubert - (1831-1895), banker, capitalist, and founder of BNP Paribas

== Notable teachers ==
- Maurice Goldring, English professor
- Octave Gréard, academic
- Jacques Hadamard, mathematician
- Léopold Lacour, rhetoric professor, lecturer and playwright
