= Grinds =

Term used in Ireland for private tuition

In Ireland, grinds are a form of private tuition. The grinds industry in Ireland, particularly at secondary school level, acts as a supplement to other forms of schooling and is described in some sources as "shadow education". In 2012, the Revenue Commissioners launched an investigation into a perceived failure of some teachers to declare extra income from giving grinds for tax purposes. The Association of Secondary Teachers, Ireland denied that this was a widespread problem.

== Grind schools ==
Some private schools, such as Ashfield College, Bruce College, the Institute of Education, Leinster Senior College, and Yeats College which offer the Leaving Certificate as a single year (repeat) course, are sometimes called "grind schools".

A study in 2020 indicated the students from Irish-speaking secondary schools and grind schools had strong chances of progressing to further education but were significantly less likely to finish their course or achieve a 2:1 degree or greater compared to students from secondary schools.

A report, published in 2022 by the Economic and Social Research Institute (ESRI), indicated that increasing numbers of "well-off pupils" were undertaking private grinds to "boost Leaving Cert grades".

== Online grinds ==
During the COVID-19 pandemic in Ireland, Irish schools were shut down and elements of education shifted to online channels. A number of new "online-only" grinds schools were established. The rise of online grinds represented a shift in the way such education was delivered.
