= Benalla affair =

French political and judicial case

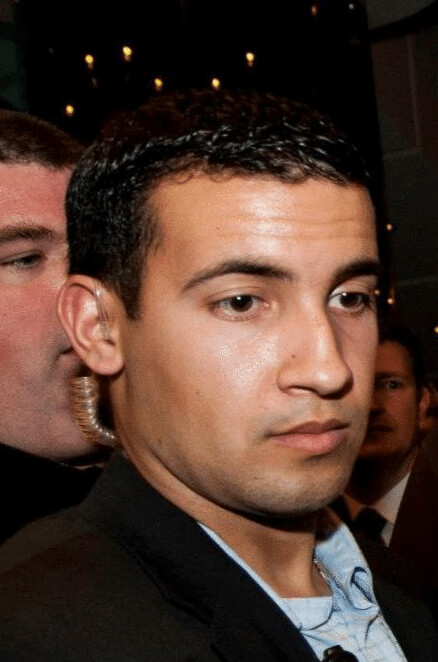
Alexandre Benalla in 2013

The Benalla affair (French: affaire Benalla) or the Benalla affairs (affaires Benalla or affaires Macron-Benalla) is political and judicial cases involving Alexandre Benalla (French pronunciation: [alɛksɑ̃dʁ bɛnala]), who served as a security officer and deputy chief of staff to President of France Emmanuel Macron.

In the first affair, the newspaper Le Monde identified Benalla on 18 July 2018 in footage as the person who beat up a young protester during the 2018 May Day demonstrations in Paris while impersonating a police officer. Following the publication of the report, the Paris public prosecutor opened a preliminary investigation on 19 July concerning "violence, usurpation of the functions of a police officer and using signs reserved for public authorities". On 20 July, the Élysée announced that Benalla would be dismissed. On 22 July, Benalla was placed under formal investigation additionally for "concealment of a violation of professional secrecy" and "concealment of the misuse of images from a video surveillance system". An accomplice, Vincent Crase, was also placed under formal investigation, as well as three police officers for illegally transmitting video surveillance to Benalla. Parts of the French political class media questioned the Élysée's responsibility in the case for its apparent concealment of the case from the public prosecutor.

In the second affair, it was revealed by the French online journal Mediapart at the end of 2018 that Benalla was still in possession of a number of diplomatic passports several months after he was fired from the Élysée staff. These passports allowed him to meet several African leaders, including the Chad President, Idriss Déby.

In the third affair, also called 'The Russian Contracts' by the French press, it was revealed again by Mediapart that Benalla had contracted financial ties with two Russian oligarchs during his tenure in the Élysée, including Iskander Makhmudov, a businessman who is said to have ties with the Russian mafia.

Both the National Assembly and Senate launched parliamentary inquiries into the affairs, with Interior Minister Gérard Collomb, Paris police chief Michel Delpuech, Department of Public Order and Traffic (DOPC) director Alain Gibelin, Prime Minister Édouard Philippe and Élysée chief of staff Patrick Strzoda among those called to testify. Opposition lawmakers in the National Assembly also announced their intention to submit a motion of no confidence against the government.

== Background ==
On 1 May 2018, violence during May Day demonstrations led to significant damage and the arrests of 283 people with 109 taken into custody in Paris, in addition to several injuries. In the group of 1,200 "black bloc" protesters present that day a group of them destroyed a branch of McDonald's, making the police use tear gas grenades (GLIF4) on the Austerlitz bridge and the Hospital Boulevard. Protesters tried to escape the gas by getting into the Jardin des Plantes, a few of them were arrested by the police there. At the same time, firefighters opened the gate of the park to free them.

Alexandre Benalla (born 8 September 1991 in Évreux) was reportedly a Socialist Party (PS) activist in Eure, his home department, before offering his services as a bodyguard with the PS, which assigned him to the entourage of Martine Aubry from 2008 to 2012, during which time Aubry was First Secretary of the party. He was later assigned to protect François Hollande as well as, briefly, Arnaud Montebourg. A week into his assignment, he was dismissed after causing a car accident and wanting to flee from the scene. Following his dismissal, he protected artists before joining the security force of Emmanuel Macron, whom Benalla supported, during his presidential campaign. He also worked with PS deputy Pascale Boistard as an unpaid parliamentary assistant in 2012 and had access to some areas of the Palais Bourbon.

From 2010 to 2013, Benalla began his career as a reservist gendarme in Eure under then-platoon commander Sébastien Lecornu, who at the time was a member of the Union for a Popular Movement (UMP) and member of the cabinet of then-agriculture minister Bruno Le Maire. Both Lecornu and Le Maire were appointed as ministers in the government assembled after the election of Macron, with Lecornu serving as Secretary of State to the Minister for the Ecological and Inclusive Transition and Le Maire becoming Minister of Economy and Finance. Benalla would later support Le Maire in his bid to lead the party in its 2014 leadership election. On 18 March 2016, Benalla was acquitted following a complaint of violence filed against him in Boulogne-Billancourt in August 2015 by a woman who stated that she was unable to work for more than 8 days as a result.

His name appeared numerous times in the 2017 Macron e-mail leaks, dubbed "MacronLeaks", having procured several non-lethal weapons and riot shields. At the request of the Élysée to aide him in his capacity as a security officer, Benalla was granted a carry license by the Paris police prefecture in October 2017. Karim Achoui, the founder of the Muslim Judicial Defense League with whom Benalla was close, made a previous request for a carry permit that was denied in 2013 in his capacity as a lawyer. During a March 2017 campaign event in Caen, he allegedly pushed a Public Sénat journalist 50 meters and seized his press badge, which granted close access to Macron and his supporters, without giving any explanation.

Benalla seemed to maintain a close relationship with Macron as he was the only member of his cabinet to join a skiing trip at the end of 2017, the only other invitees being his security detail.

== Case ==
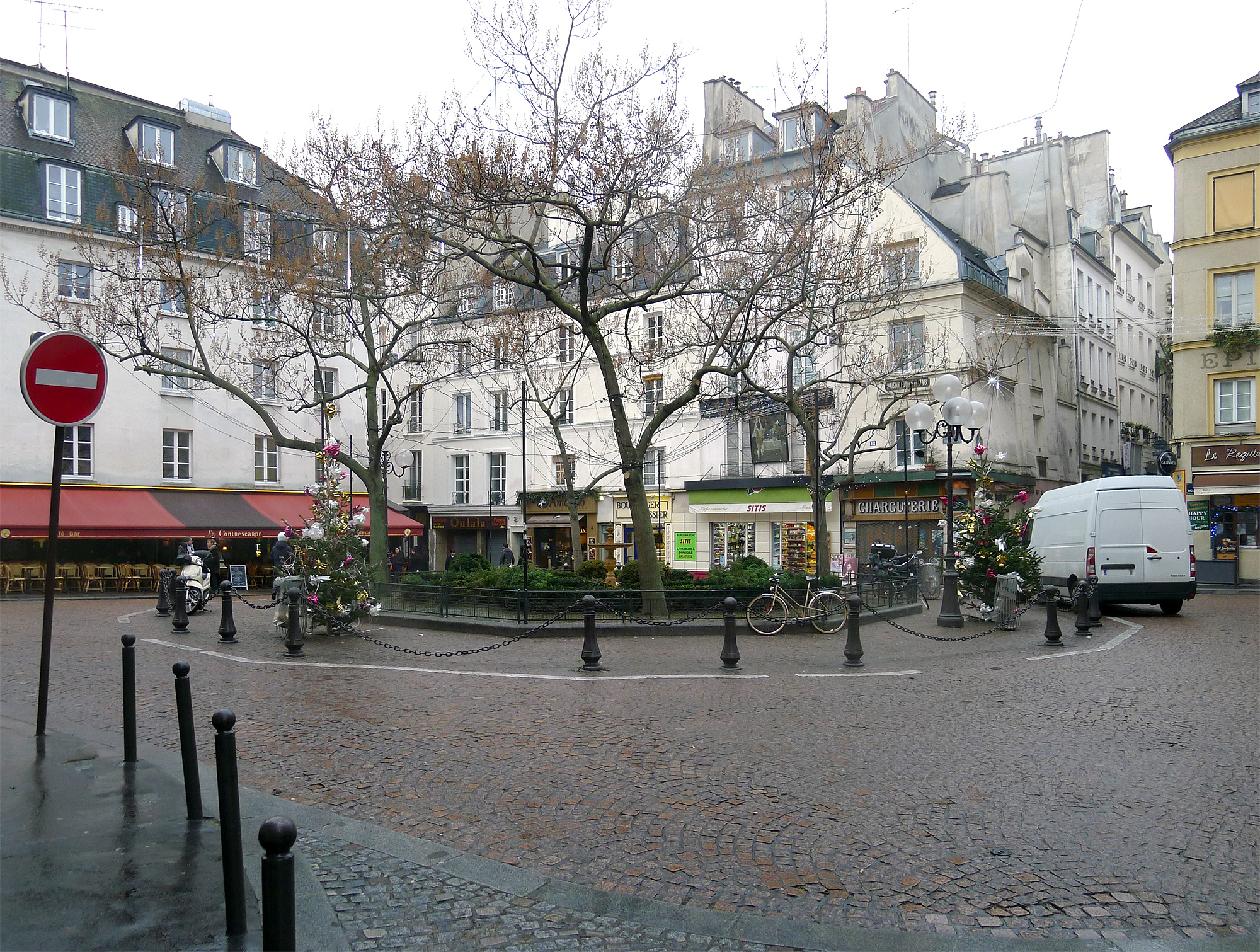
Place de la Contrescarpe in Paris, where the assault took place

On 18 July 2018, Le Monde revealed in an article that 26-year-old Alexandre Benalla, who served as a security officer to President of France Emmanuel Macron during the 2017 presidential campaign and was later hired as deputy chief of staff to the president under François-Xavier Lauch, was the person who grabbed a young man by the neck during the May Day demonstrations before hitting him several times in a video taken at the Place de la Contrescarpe published on Facebook by a La France Insoumise activist. In the video, Benalla wore a police helmet despite not being a police officer. According to Patrick Strzoda, Benalla asked him for permission to join the police during May Day to observe how a large demonstration was managed. After Strzoda was informed that Benalla had been seen in the videos, Benalla said that he was the individual shown in the videos and Strzoda informed Macron, then in Australia, of the situation. As a result, Benalla was temporarily suspended from 4 to 19 May before being reassigned to the security of events at the Élysée Palace, including the celebration of the victory of the national football team after winning the 2018 FIFA World Cup just days before the publication of the report. However, these claims were questioned by journalists who uncovered photos after the supposed reassignment as part of Macron's entourage. A second video, showing a different angle of the incident, was posted to Twitter on 19 July, showing Benalla grabbing a woman by the neck and dragging her away before leaving towards the other protester.

Benalla was accompanied by Vincent Crase, a reservist gendarme hired by La République En Marche!, who likewise served as a security officer for Macron during the 2017 presidential campaign. Crase, like Benalla, received a 15-day suspension for his conduct in the May Day demonstrations, and remained employed by the party, but unlike Benalla, had ended "any collaboration" with the office of the presidency. A third individual, Philippe Mizerski, was identified; Mizerski, a member of the Department of Public Order and Traffic (DOPC) in Paris was responsible for supervising Benalla's role as an "observer" but did not attempt to stop Benalla from assaulting the protesters.

On 19 July, the Paris prosecutor announced that it opened a preliminary investigation into incidents of "violence, usurpation of the functions of a police officer and using insignia reserved for public authorities" concerning Alexandre Benalla. Strzoda was heard as a witness in the investigation the same day. Minister of the Interior Gérard Collomb also announced that he referred the case to the General Inspectorate of the National Police (IGPN) and that its report would be published publicly, with the IGPN charged with investigating how Benalla and Crase were allowed to participate in overseeing the demonstrations alongside the police. The interior ministry, however, said that no immediate action had been taken against either of the two on 1 May, despite having been aware of the incident, and France Inter revealed that Collomb himself was informed about the incident on 2 May before the Élysée took action to suspend Benalla on 3 May.

On 20 July, the Élysée announced that it had initiated a dismissal procedure against Benalla following the discovery of "new facts" of the case related to the suspension of three police officers – Laurent Simonin, Maxence Creusat, and Jean-Yves Hunault – for apparently passing on surveillance footage to Benalla, presumably to help him prepare his defense in what Collomb described as a potentially "serious breach of ethics". The footage, which was copied by the officers and sent to Benalla the evening the article in Le Monde was published, depicts another angle not shown by the other videos and should theoretically not have existed, given that video footage older than a month was supposed to be automatically erased. After obtaining the footage, Benalla reportedly shared it with Ismaël Emelien, a political advisor close to Macron, and other Élysée officials viewed this footage as well. The Paris prosecutor office took both Benella and Crase into custody in the morning. A photo obtained of Benalla's official car in a parking lot before it was removed on 19 July showed the vehicle equipped with police devices despite not belonging to the police. Le Monde reported on 20 July that Benalla declared his official residence from 9 July as the Palais de l'Alma at 11 quai Branly, a dependency of the Élysée, with 180,000 euros earmarked to house Benalla, according to a report in L'Express.

On 22 July, Benalla was placed under formal investigation additionally for "concealment of a violation of professional secrecy" and "concealment of the misuse of images from a video surveillance system", in addition to Crase and the three suspended police officers. The apparent victims in the videos were also identified and asked to testify at a later date. On 23 July, Benalla's lawyers (Laurent-Franck Lienard and Audrey Gadot) issued a statement – the first since the beginning of the affair – saying that Benalla was "stunned by the media and political usage" of his actions during the May Day demonstrations and that he "took the initiative to lend a hand" by helping to "control" what they described as "two particularly virulent individuals". Benalla's office at the Élysée was subject to a police raid lasting several hours on 25 July.

On 27 July, Libération published a video showing that Benalla and Crase were involved in another demonstrator's arrest several hours before, in the Jardin des plantes, ordering one of the demonstrators to remove photographs and videos she filmed.

On 9 February 2019, Benalla was in remand for one week.

== Reactions ==
Members of the majority in the National Assembly were reportedly "stunned" by the revelations. While many avoided contact with the press and others deflected media inquiries by referring them to the Élysée, some La République En Marche deputies suggesting the two-week suspension of Benalla was too lenient a response. The revelations came amid the examination in the National Assembly of amendments to the proposed constitutional revision on 19 July, with opposition deputies frequently interrupting the session to demand the creation of an investigative committee into the case. The opposition accused the government of being too lenient in its sanctions against Benalla, and of failing to inform the public prosecutor as required under article 40 of the code of criminal procedure, which stipulates that any public official or civil servant who becomes aware of a crime or misdemeanor must immediately inform the public prosecutor of the incident. The affair eventually forced the government to suspend the examination of the constitutional revision on 22 July.

Asked about the case while visiting Dordogne, Emmanuel Macron responded that the Republic was "unalterable" and told a journalist that "I did not come to see you, I came here to see Mr. Mayor." After meeting with Azerbaijani President Ilham Aliyev on 20 July, Macron failed to hold a joint press conference, as customary following visits from other heads of state. A video of less than two minutes was sent to media representatives by Élysée spokesman Bruno Roger-Petit on 19 July, prompting criticism regarding the Élysée's communication strategy throughout the affair, and journalists and commentators castigated Macron for failing to explain himself. Macron called a crisis meeting with members of the government on the evening of 22 July. His Twitter account, usually active, fell silent for four days until returning to express solidarity with Greece during the 2018 Attica wildfires. On 24 July, Macron broke his silence on the affair and spoke before lawmakers from his party, stating that he alone bore responsibility and that no members of his cabinet had ever been above the law.

Benoît Hamon demanded the resignation of Collomb as interior minister, while Socialist leader Olivier Faure did not exclude the possibility of pressing for him to resign should he fail to give a sufficient explanation. Jean-Luc Mélenchon, president of the La France Insoumise group in the National Assembly, announced that he intended to attempt to submit a vote of no confidence against the government, and said that the affair was "at the level of Watergate". Faure also favored a motion of no confidence unless a clear explanation was given, but appeared reluctant to sign on to any motion proposed by Mélenchon. On 24 July, Christian Jacob of The Republicans (LR) announced that his group, with 103 members, would submit a motion of no confidence (which requires 58 signatures) against the government, though he acknowledged that the vote would not succeed given the government's majority. Mélenchon's group, with 17 deputies, would not have been able to submit one without the support of other deputies, and FI deputy Alexis Corbière subsequently announced that the group would be prepared to sign a LR-submitted motion. The LR group officially submitted a motion of no confidence on 26 July, followed by the three groups on the left – the New Left, La France Insoumise, and Democratic and Republican Left – filing a joint motion on 27 July to be debated on 31 July, followed by the right's on 2 August.

In his first public interview since the story broke, Benalla said that he made a "mistake", that he was qualified to carry a weapon as a reservist gendarme, acknowledged tensions with the Security Group for the Presidency of the Republic (GSPR), that he requested housing of only 80 square meters as opposed the 300 reported by L'Express, that he was invited by Simonin to observe the May Day protests, and that he did not request the video surveillance footage of the incident procured by three police officers. SMS messages obtained by Le Monde published on 26 July appeared to indicate that Simonin invited Benalla to the May Day protests. Interviewed on TF1 on 27 July, Benalla insisted he did nothing wrong and that he was acting as a "citizen" against those he considered to be "delinquents".

== Parliamentary inquiries ==
=== National assembly ===
On the evening of 19 July, the Law Committee of the National Assembly headed by Yaël Braun-Pivet voted to open a parliamentary inquiry into the case lasting one month with the agreement of all group presidents in the National Assembly. Minister of the Interior Gérard Collomb was to be called to testify before the National Assembly for its inquiry; however, the majority and opposition on 20 July failed to agree on a timetable, with the prior proposing 21 July and the latter 23 July. Eventually, the committee agreed to hear Collomb on 23 July, followed by Paris police chief Michel Delpuech several hours later, though co-rapporteur Guillaume Larrivé of The Republicans (LR) wished to also interview both Benalla and Crase as well as Christophe Castaner, Alexis Kohler, and Bruno Roger-Petit. The groups disagreed on the publicity of the hearings, with the opposition calling for open hearings. Though the opposition also called for Prime Minister Édouard Philippe to speak before the National Assembly, he demurred, justifying his absence by citing his scheduled travel to watch the 2018 Tour de France. Though numerous opposition politicians also called for Macron himself to testify, legal experts disagreed on whether such an intervention was permitted under the constitution.

In his testimony on 23 July, Collomb blamed the Paris police, saying that he was aware of Benalla's actions but did not alert the judiciary because it was not within his responsibility to do so. He said that he believed that appropriate action (i.e., the two-week suspension of Benalla) had been taken by the Élysée, and also said that he had never discussed the affair with Macron until the day before his testimony, instead saying that Macron was "preoccupied by the constitutional reform", triggering laughter among the deputies present. Article 40 of the code of criminal procedure, however, makes no hierarchical stipulations, and there exists no such limitation prohibiting officials from reporting crimes not committed by subordinates. According to Delpuech, Laurent Simonin – one of the officers suspended for transmitting video surveillance footage to Benalla – granted permission to Benalla to observe the demonstration of the police while he himself was unaware until being informed of the incident at a later point, and pinned the transmission of these tapes upon "unhealthy cronyism". Le Monde identified several contradictions between the testimony of Collomb and Delpuech, namely related to when and how the prior was informed about the incident. Alain Gibelin, director of the DOPC, stated that Benalla had "no authorization" to be present as an observer at the demonstration, countering previous claims, though later rescinded his initial response indicating that the Élysée had lied about Benalla's suspension and affirmed that he had misheard the dates.

Speaking before both chambers on 24 July, Philippe argued that the penalty imposed upon Benalla was appropriate and said that the case did not constitute a state scandal. In the following hearing, chief of staff Strzoda said that he was the individual who made the decision suspend Benalla, with the suspension implemented after Macron was later informed by Kohler while in Australia. He also said that he did not deem the information he received from the IGPN regarding Benalla sufficient to report under article 40, and categorically denied the "rumors" regarding benefits and privileges reportedly afforded to Benalla; however, he refused to give the amount of his salary or the details of his apartment. Testifying before the Senate on 25 July, Strzoda revealed that Benalla received a full salary for the month of May during which he was suspended, and his days of leave were instead reduced to compensate for this. Kohler echoed earlier answers, saying he believed that Benalla's punishment was sufficient given the facts known at the time and that article 40 did not need to be invoked; he also declined to provide Benalla's salary, details of his housing, carry permit, and other assets. Meanwhile, the atmosphere of the National Assembly's investigation deteriorated as tensions grew between members of the majority and opposition, with the latter alleging that Braun-Pivet attempted to impede its progress and avoid hearing staff at the Élysée, Interior Ministry, La République En Marche, and police unions, some of which had been already interviewed by the Senate. On 26 July, Larrivé announced that he suspended his participation in the investigation, considering it a farce faced against the Élysée's apparent efforts to hinder its progress, and the rest of the opposition subsequently quit the inquiry.

=== Senate ===
The Law Committee in the Senate, presided over by Philippe Bas, also opened a parliamentary inquiry into the case and interviewed Collomb in a public hearing on 24 July; unlike the assembly's inquiry, the Senate's had six months to investigate. The Senate committee also interviewed Delpuech, Éric Morvan, Alexis Kohler, Patrick Strzoda, Christophe Castaner, and other related individuals in the course of its investigation.

On 20 February 2019, the Senate published their report about the Benalla affair. The French press and media interpreted the report as a fierce critique of major dysfunctions within the Élysée Palace and the top of the French state.

== See also ==
- List of political scandals in France
