= Richard Ferrand =

French politician (born 1962)

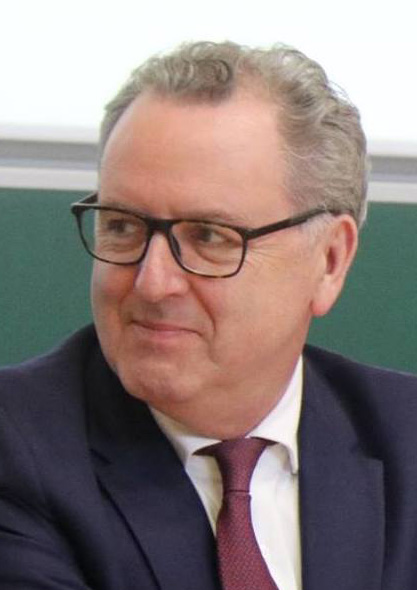
- Ferrand in 2019

President of the Constitutional Council
- Incumbent
- Assumed office 8 March 2025
- Appointed by: Emmanuel Macron
- Preceded by: Laurent Fabius

President of the National Assembly
- In office 12 September 2018 – 21 June 2022
- Preceded by: François de Rugy
- Succeeded by: Yaël Braun-Pivet

President of the La République En Marche! group in the National Assembly
- In office 27 June 2017 – 12 September 2018
- Preceded by: Group established
- Succeeded by: Gilles Le Gendre

Minister of Territorial Cohesion
- In office 17 May 2017 – 19 June 2017
- President: Emmanuel Macron
- Prime Minister: Édouard Philippe
- Preceded by: Emmanuelle Cosse
- Succeeded by: Jacques Mézard

Member of the National Assembly for Finistère's 6th constituency
- In office 19 June 2012 – 21 June 2022
- Preceded by: Christian Ménard
- Succeeded by: Mélanie Thomin

General Secretary of En Marche!
- In office 1 October 2016 – 22 June 2017
- President: Emmanuel Macron; Catherine Barbaroux (Acting)
- Preceded by: Ludovic Chaker
- Succeeded by: Stéphane Roques

Personal details
- Born: 1 July 1962 (age 64) Rodez, France
- Party: Renaissance (2016–present)
- Other political affiliations: Socialist Party (1980–2017)
- Education: Toulouse 1 University Capitole; Paris Descartes University

Richard Ferrand (French pronunciation: [ʁiʃaʁ fɛʁɑ̃]; born 1 July 1962) is a French politician of Renaissance who has served as President of the Constitutional Council since 8 March 2025. He previously served as President of the National Assembly from 2018 to 2022. He had served as a member of the National Assembly for Finistère's 6th constituency from 2012 to 2022. A longtime member of the Socialist Party, he was LREM's General Secretary from October 2016. He briefly served as Minister for the Cohesion of Territories between May and June 2017 before resigning due to nepotism accusations. Following his resignation, he became the leader of the party's group in the National Assembly in June 2017 and then was elected to the Chamber's Presidency in September 2018.

In June 2022, he became the third incumbent presiding officer of the French lower house in history to be unseated after distant predecessors Raymond Forni in 2002 and Armand Marrast in 1849 (during the French Second Republic).

== Early life ==
Ferrand was born on 1 July 1962 in Rodez, France. Ferrand graduated high school in Bünde, Germany and studied German and Law at Toulouse 1 University Capitole and then Université Paris-Descartes where he became a PS member at the age of 18.

After leaving university, Ferrand worked as a journalist for multiple publications including Center Presse, Auto Moto, Circuler, Vie publique, La Dépêche du Midi and Le Monde. In 1991, Ferrand became the communications advisor for Kofi Yamgnane, the then- secretary of state to the Minister of Social Affairs and Integration.

== Career ==
=== Early beginnings ===
Ferrand joined the Socialist Party (PS) in 1980 and was elected as the councillor in the township of Carhaix-Plouguer in 1998 as his first elected office. In the municipal elections in 2001 and 2008, Ferrand lost in both times, obtaining 31% of the vote in 2008.

In the 2010 regional elections, Ferrard was one of the PS nominees for the Finistère department. He became councillor for the region on 21 March 2010 and has since chaired the socialist and related group.

In 2007, Ferrand ran for Finistère's 6th constituency under the PS banner. He lost to Christian Ménard who achieved 50.19% of the vote. In 2012, Ferrand ran in the same constituency for PS where he got 32.2% of the vote in the first round and then 58.3% of the vote in the second round.

=== Member of the National Assembly (2012-2022) ===
In the National Assembly, Ferrand was a member of the SER (Socialist, Ecologist and Republican) group and sat on the National Defence and Armed Forces Committee and later the Social Affairs Committee. He has never worked in the agricultural or agri-food sector, but is co-chairman of the agricultural and agro-food industries group. He particularly involves himself in social issues and the use of cheaper labour than currently available.

While on the Social Affairs Committee, Ferrand was an EU-appointed rapporteur on resolutions around workers and the use of cheaper European labor. In his report, he stated that European workers feel detached due to the lack of social cohesion and the use of cheaper labour to replace them. He advocates measures to limit the replacement of workers.

Despite Ferrand's opposition to the Bonnets Rouges movement against the eco-tax, which was started by the Fillon government and further expanded upon by the Ayrault Government, he took a stand against the expansions, saying they underline the complexity of the tax system. He supports amendments to the eco-tax. After there was a postponement of the eco-tax, Ferrand and other Breton politicians asked Minister of Energy, Ségolène Royal to rethink the tax plan.

On 3 October 2014, the Prime Minister Manuel Valls appointed Ferrard along with the minister of economy, Emmanuel Macron to work on a plan to reform regulations based around labour. He was tasked with looking at the "legal framework that restricts labour from developing" while paying attention to the different situations from many different regions. After consulting many trade unions, experts and other associations, he submitted the report that stresses that reforming the regulated labor market is needed but "reform, don't break, this includes twenty-eight proposals that are aimed particularly at promoting young people's access to the job market."

This reform was eventually put to the National Assembly where it was amended by the members of the assembly which resulted in the "Act for Growth, Activity and Equal Opportunity" or the Macron law which was lobbied against by unions and other organizations.

Ferrand was then appointed as the general rapporteur, one of the biggest reforms within the first five years of President Hollande's term with over 300 articles and sectors such as: transport, savings, labor courts, housings and qualified professions being reformed. More than one hundred and eleven hours went into debate in the National Assembly over the reform. The text was eventually adopted including measures that were originally not there but added during parliamentary debate such as: Letting commercial stores open on Sundays, liberalization of transport services and encouraging qualified professions to allow young people into the profession.

==== General Secretary of LREM party (October 2016) ====
On 16 October 2016, Ferrand was appointed General Secretary of En Marche! by Emmanuel Macron, someone he worked with closely when he was the minister for Economy. The following month, he resigned from leading the PS group in the regional council for Finistère, and confirmed that he quit the PS on 9 May 2017.

==== Minister for the Cohesion of Territories (2017) ====
On 17 May 2017, Ferrand was appointed Minister for the Cohesion of Territories in the First Philippe government, a new Ministry which merged the former Housing, City and Territory Management ministries in one brand-new ministry.

Shortly into his tenure, he faced accusations of nepotism and, on 1 June 2017, the Brest Prosecutor opened preliminary investigations into the allegations.

On 19 June 2017, just a day after easily getting reelected as MP in his Finistère constituency in the second round of the 2017 parliamentary elections, Ferrand resigned from Cabinet at the President's request. Macron asked for him to step down as Minister and lead the LREM parliamentary party in the National Assembly instead.

==== Elected leader of the LREM party (June 2017) ====
On 24 June 2017, it was announced that Ferrand was officially elected leader of La République En Marche! group in the National Assembly with 306 votes and 2 abstentions.

From November 2017 to June 2022, Ferrand has been part of LREM's executive board under the leadership of the party's successive chairmen Christophe Castaner and Stanislas Guerini.

==== President of the National Assembly (2018-2022) ====
On 12 September 2018, after being selected as the majority's candidate in an internal primary, Ferrand was elected President of the National Assembly with 254 votes out of 484, replacing LREM colleague François de Rugy who had just been appointed Minister for Ecological and Solidary Transition in the Second Philippe Government.

As presiding officer of the Assembly, he oversaw a sweeping reform of the lower house's parliamentary procedure and rules in May 2019. Later that year, in September, he caused controversy by allegedly twisting the result of a show of hands on a majority amendment that would have been defeated otherwise.

Ahead of the 2022 legislative elections, he helped forming a coalition of LREM with two other centrist parties – Democratic Movement (MoDem) and Horizons – to coordinate which candidates it presents.

In the 2022 French legislative election, Ferrand lost his seat in the French National Assembly to Socialist Mélanie Thomin. On this occasion, he became the third incumbent presiding officer of the French lower house in history to lose reelection as MP after predecessors Raymond Forni in 2002 and Armand Marrast in 1849 (under the French Second Republic).

=== Consultant career (2022-2025) ===
After leaving the National Assembly because of his defeat at the polls in the 2022 French legislative elections, Ferrand set up a consulting firm in October 2022.

=== President of the Constitutional Council ===
On 19 February 2025, after his appointment by the President Emmanuel Macron, Ferrand was confirmed as President of the Constitutional Council, by a slim majority of one vote. The abstention of the Rassemblement National party saved President Macron from a stinging rebuke. The appointment was approved by the Law Committees of the Parliament's Houses.

Party political offices
Preceded by Ludovic Chaker	General Secretary of En Marche! 2016–2017	Succeeded by Stéphane Roques
Political offices
Preceded by Emmanuelle Cosse	Minister of Territorial Cohesion; 2017	Succeeded by Jacques Mézard
Preceded by François de Rugy	President of the National Assembly; 2018–2022	Succeeded by Yaël Braun-Pivet
Legal offices
Preceded by Laurent Fabius	President of the Constitutional Council; 2025–present	Incumbent
Order of precedence
Preceded by François Bayrou as former Prime Minister	Order of precedence of France; President of the Constitutional Council	Succeeded by Didier Tabuteau as Vice President of the Council of State
