= Yaël Braun-Pivet =

French politician (born 1970)

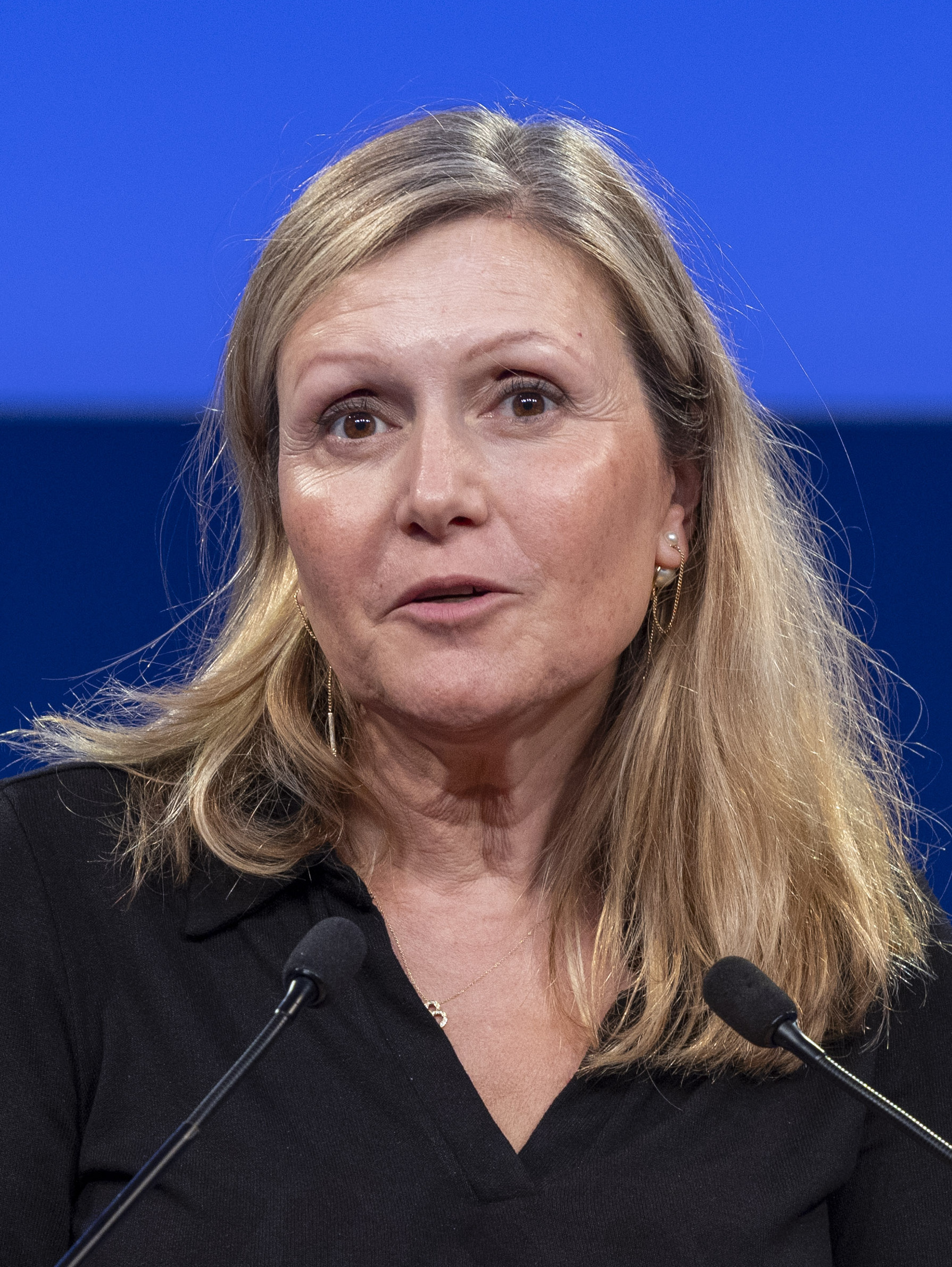
- Braun-Pivet in 2023

President of the National Assembly
- Incumbent
- Assumed office 28 June 2022
- Preceded by: Richard Ferrand

Minister of the Overseas
- In office 20 May 2022 – 25 June 2022
- Prime Minister: Élisabeth Borne
- Preceded by: Sébastien Lecornu
- Succeeded by: Jean-François Carenco (Minister Delegate)

Member of the National Assembly for Yvelines's 5th constituency
- Incumbent
- Assumed office 21 June 2017
- Preceded by: Jacques Myard
- Majority: 10,557 (29.24%)

Personal details
- Born: Yaël Braun; 7 December 1970 (age 55) Nancy, France
- Party: Renaissance (2016–present)
- Spouse: Vianney Pivet (m. 2014)
- Children: 5
- Education: Paris Nanterre University
- Profession: Lawyer

Yaël Braun-Pivet (French pronunciation: [jaɛl bʁonpivɛ]; born 7 December 1970) is a French lawyer and politician who has been President of the French National Assembly since 28 June 2022. The first woman to hold the position, she was re-elected on 18 July 2024 following the 2024 snap election.

A member of Renaissance (RE), she briefly previously was Minister of the Overseas under Prime Minister Élisabeth Borne from May to June 2022. She has been a member of the National Assembly since 2017, representing the department of Yvelines.

== Background ==
Braun-Pivet was born Yaël Braun in Nancy in Eastern France. Her paternal grandparents were Jewish - her grandfather was a Polish tailor while her grandmother was German - and had settled in France in the 1930s in order to escape antisemitism. After World War II, her grandfather received the French Resistance Medal. Braun-Pivet's mother had grown up in care.

Braun-Pivet attended a Jewish school in Strasbourg and went on to study law at Paris Nanterre University. After practising as a criminal lawyer for several years, she followed her husband, an executive with L'Oréal, to Taiwan and Japan, where the two youngest of their five children were born. On their return to France in 2012, Braun-Pivet took up voluntary work with Restaurants du Cœur (a French charity which distributes food to those in need), where she organised a free legal advice service.

== Political career ==
Braun-Pivet, representing Emmanuel Macron's Renaissance Party, was elected as a member of the French National Assembly for the 5th constituency of Yvelines in the legislative election in June 2017. That same month she was elected chair of the Law Committee. She led the work of the committee on a 2017 law regulating conflict of interest among elected officials, which had been initiated as a consequence of the Fillon affair. In 2018, when she was chair of the inquiry into the Benalla Affair, she was criticised for her refusal to summon Alexis Kohler, general secretary of the president's office, to give evidence. In September 2018, after François de Rugy's appointment to the government, Braun-Pivet announced her candidacy for the presidency of the National Assembly; she eventually withdrew and instead endorsed Richard Ferrand.

In February 2021, Braun-Pivet received the support of the entire National Assembly after being targeted by an email with anti-Semitic insults and threats; shortly after, the Paris prosecutor's office opened an investigation. Braun-Pivet was appointed Minister of Overseas Territories in May 2022 but stepped down a month later when she became President of the National Assembly following the legislative election. She was the first woman to hold the position. On 4 March 2024, Braun-Pivet became the first woman to preside over a joint session of the Assembly and Senate, overseeing the historic vote to inscribe the "freedom of women to voluntarily terminate a pregnancy" in the French constitution. On 9 June 2024, Macron dissolved the French Parliament and announced a snap election following defeat of his party in the European elections. Braun-Pivet was doubtful about Macron's decision, suggesting that he could have considered forming a coalition instead. She retained her seat in the legislative election, winning 49.1% of the votes in the second round.

Braun-Pivet was re-elected as President of the National Assembly on 18 July 2024 after three rounds of voting by members. In the final round she won 220 votes, ahead of André Chassaigne of the New Popular Front with 207, and Sébastien Chenu of the National Rally with 141. On 31 July 2024, the Constitutional Council rejected an appeal filed by La France Insoumise against Braun-Pivet's re-election; the following day a similar appeal was lodged by Marine Le Pen.

== Political positions ==
In July 2019, Braun-Pivet voted in favor of the French ratification of the European Union's Comprehensive Economic and Trade Agreement (CETA) with Canada. In 2021, she proposed a new ad-hoc body to better supervise the government's decision-making process on the COVID-19 pandemic in France. Also in 2021, Braun-Pivet voted against the party line and instead supported draft legislation proposed by the Liberties and Territories group aimed at legalising assisted suicide. On 10 October 2023, at the beginning of the Gaza war, she advocated for "unconditional" support for Israel. After criticism from the left-wing opposition for her choice of words, she clarified that the unconditional support referred to Israel's right to exist and not to the Israeli government.

Political offices
| Preceded by Sébastien Lecornu | Minister of the Overseas; 2022 | Succeeded by Élisabeth Borne; Acting |
| Preceded by Richard Ferrand | President of the National Assembly; 2022–present | Incumbent |
Order of precedence
| Preceded by Gérard Larcher as President of the Senate | Order of precedence of France; President of the National Assembly | Succeeded by Nicolas Sarkozy as former President of the Republic |
