= Yvelines's 5th constituency =

Constituency of the National Assembly of France

5th constituency of Yvelines
- inline Constituency of the National Assembly of France

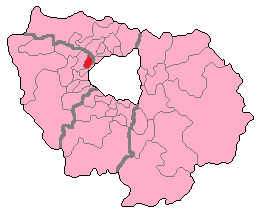
- Yvelines' 5th Constituency shown within Île-de-France
- Deputy: Yaël Braun-Pivet; RE
- Department: Yvelines
- Cantons: Maisons-Laffitte, Sartrouville, Vésinet
- Registered voters: 72,109

The 5th constituency of Yvelines is a legislative constituency in the north-central French department of Yvelines.

== Description ==
The 5th constituency of Yvelines is one of a group of constituencies within the department formed from the wealthy western suburbs of Paris. The seat includes Maisons-Laffitte to the west of the Seine and Sartrouville on the eastern side.

Until 2017 the constituency consistently returned conservatives to the National Assembly. Its former representative Jacques Myard first won the seat in 1993. In both 2002 and 2007 he won over 50% of the vote in the first round thus negating the need for a second round run off.

== Historic representation ==
Election	Member	Party
1967	Bernard Destremau	RI
1968	Bernard Destremau	RI
1973	Bernard Destremau	RI
1974	Jean Riquin	RI
1976	Bernard Destremau	RI
1978	Étienne Pinte	RPR
1981	Étienne Pinte	RPR
1986	Proportional representation – no election by constituency	
1988	Alain Jonemann	RPR
1993	Jacques Myard	RPR
1997	Jacques Myard	RPR
2002	Jacques Myard	UMP
2007	Jacques Myard	UMP
2012	Jacques Myard	UMP
2017	Yaël Braun-Pivet	LREM
2022	Yaël Braun-Pivet	RE
2024	Yaël Braun-Pivet	RE

== Election results ==
=== 2024 ===
Candidate	Party	Alliance	First round			Second round		
Candidate	Party	Alliance	Votes	%	+/–	Votes	%	+/–
Yaël Braun-Pivet	RE	ENS	22,874	42.79	+6.20	25,400	49.10	+6.31
Yassine Benyettou	LFI	NFP	14,600	27.31	+3.76	14,564	28.16	+0.85
Jacques Myard	LR-RN	UXD	12,241	22.90	+15.12	11,763	22.74	-0.16
Emilienne Guille	REC		1,826	3.42	-2.14			
Nathalie Lepage	DIV		942	1.76	N/A			
Alain Lépicier	LO		454	0.85	+0.10			
Ingrid Larose	EXD		430	0.80	N/A			
Serilo Looky	DIV		84	0.16	N/A			
Valid votes			53,451	97.83		51,727	98.03	+0.20
Blank votes			949	1.74	+0.55	812	1.54	-0.20
Null votes			235	0.43	+0.12	226	0.43	n/a
Turnout			54,635	71.17	+18.04	52,765	68.72	-2.45
Abstentions			22,131	28.83	-18.04	24,020	31.28	+2.45
Registered voters			76,766			76,785		
Source: Ministry of the Interior, Le Monde
Result						REN HOLD		

=== 2022 ===
Legislative Election 2022: Yvelines's 5th constituency
Party	Candidate	Votes	%	±%
LREM (Ensemble)	Yaël Braun-Pivet	14,483	36.59	-10.56
LFI (NUPÉS)	Sophie Thevenet	9,322	23.56	+13.24
LR (UDC)	Alexandra Dublanche	7,086	17.90	−9.44
RN	Mathilde Androuet	3,079	7.78	+2.45
REC	Maxence Bringuier	2,201	5.56	N/A
UDI (UDC)	Amélie Therond Keraudren	1,350	3.41	N/A
PA	Jean-Luc Dene	932	2.35	N/A
Others	N/A	1,132	2.86	
Turnout		39,585	53.13	+0.53
2nd round result
LREM (Ensemble)	Yaël Braun-Pivet	23,336	64.62	+5.63
LFI (NUPÉS)	Sophie Thevenet	12,779	35.38	N/A
Turnout		36,115	50.83	+5.60
LREM hold				

=== 2017 ===
Legislative Election 2017: Yvelines's 5th constituency
Party	Candidate	Votes	%	±%
LREM	Yaël Braun-Pivet	18,299	47.15	
LR	Jacques Myard	10,611	27.34	
LFI	Sophie Thevenet	3,203	8.25	
PRG	Isabelle Amaglio-Terisse	2,080	5.36	
FN	Laurence Toulemonde	2,069	5.33	
EELV	Jean-Philippe Mars	801	2.06	
Others	N/A	1,745		
Turnout		38,808	52.60	
2nd round result
LREM	Yaël Braun-Pivet	19,684	58.99	
LR	Jacques Myard	13,686	41.01	
Turnout		33,370	45.23	
LREM gain from LR				

=== 2012 ===
Legislative Election 2012: Yvelines's 5th constituency
Party	Candidate	Votes	%	±%
UMP	Jacques Myard	18,821	45.69	
PS	Michèle Vitrac-Pouzoulet	13,274	32.23	
FN	Anne de Ferluc	3,519	8.54	
MoDem	Caroline Boisnel	1,561	3.79	
FG	Roger Audroin	1,463	3.55	
EELV	Romain Chiaradia	1,403	3.41	
Others	N/A	1,149		
Turnout		41,591	57.68	
2nd round result
UMP	Jacques Myard	22,103	56.92	
PS	Michèle Vitrac-Pouzoulet	16,732	43.08	
Turnout		39,712	55.07	
UMP hold				

=== 2007 ===
Legislative Election 2007: Yvelines's 5th constituency
Party	Candidate	Votes	%	±%
UMP	Jacques Myard	21,646	51.09	
PS	Michèle Vitrac-Pouzoulet	7,850	18.53	
MoDem	Caroline Boisnel	5,671	13.39	
LV	Dominique Luangpraseuth	1,569	3.70	
Far left	Jean-Yves Delannee	1,503	3.55	
FN	Danielle Weber	1,359	3.21	
NM	Damien Abad	1,343	3.17	
Others	N/A	1,427		
Turnout		42,810	60.71	
UMP hold				

=== 2002 ===
Legislative Election 2002: Yvelines's 5th constituency
Party	Candidate	Votes	%	±%
UMP	Jacques Myard	13,273	31.24	
DVD	Jean-François Bel*	10,427	24.54	
PS	Bruno Susani	9,129	21.48	
FN	Marie de Lestang	3,694	8.69	
LV	Dominique Luangpraseuth	1,141	2.69	
PCF	Sylvia Guillard	891	2.10	
DIV	Benoit Silvain	883	2.08	
Others	N/A	3,053		
Turnout		42,888	66.77	
2nd round result
UMP	Jacques Myard	23,048	63.08	
PS	Bruno Susani	13,490	36.92	
Turnout		38,102	59.32	
UMP hold				

* Withdrew before the 2nd round

=== 1997 ===
Legislative Election 1997: Yvelines's 5th constituency
Party	Candidate	Votes	%	±%
RPR	Jacques Myard	15,395	37.37	
PRG	Michel Scarbonchi	7,574	18.39	
FN	Martine Giraud	6,457	15.67	
PCF	Jean-Pierre Alexandre	2,836	6.88	
LV	Saadia Sahali	2,383	5.78	
GE	Patrick Guérard	1,402	3.40	
DIV	Albert Eizenfisz	900	2.18	
Others	N/A	4,247		
Turnout		42,736	66.63	
2nd round result
RPR	Jacques Myard	25,695	60.83	
PRG	Michel Scarbonchi	16,543	39.17	
Turnout		44,650	69.63	
RPR hold				

== Sources ==
Official results of French elections from 2002: "Résultats électoraux officiels en France" (in French).
