= Jacques Myard =

French politician (born 1947)

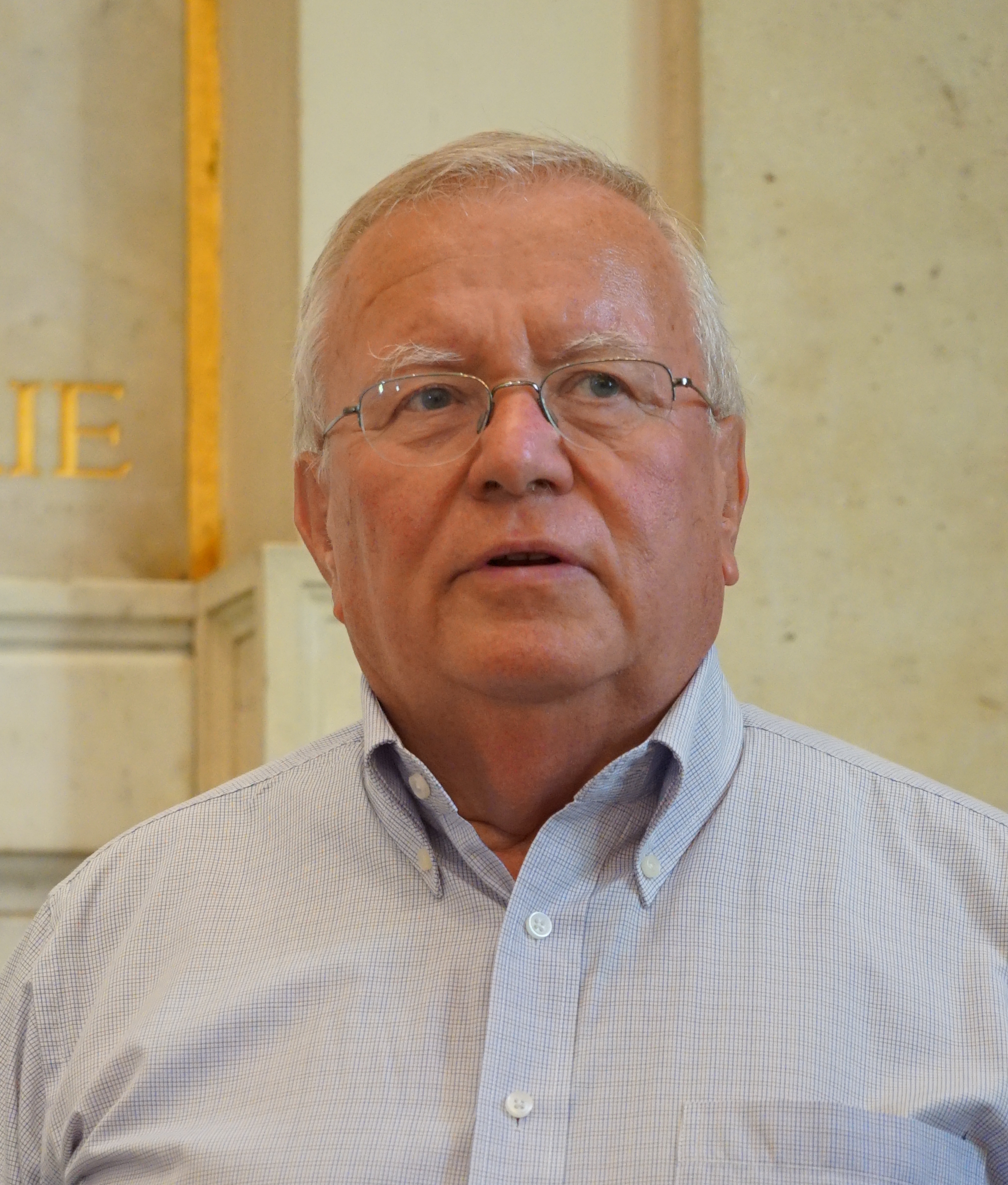

Member of the National Assembly for Yvelines's 5th constituency
- In office 2 April 1993 – 20 June 2017
- Preceded by: Alain Jonemann
- Succeeded by: Yaël Braun-Pivet

Mayor of Maisons-Laffitte
- Incumbent
- Assumed office 19 March 1989
- Preceded by: Pierre Duprès

Personal details
- Born: 14 August 1947 (age 79) Lyon, France
- Party: The Republicans (2015–2018; 2020–present)
- Other political affiliations: Rally for the Republic (until 2002); Union for a Popular Movement (2002–2015); Debout la France (2018–2020)
- Education: Sciences Po Lyon; Panthéon-Assas University; Graduate Institute of International Studies
- Occupation: Diplomat

Jacques Myard (French pronunciation: [ʒak mjaʁ]; born 14 August 1947) is a French politician and former diplomat who represented the 5th constituency of the department of Yvelines in the National Assembly from 1993 to 2017. A member of The Republicans (LR), he has also served as Mayor of Maisons-Laffitte since 1989.

== Political career ==
In 1983, Myard entered the municipal council of Maisons-Laffitte, Yvelines for the Rally for the Republic. In 1989, he was elected to the mayorship of Maisons-Laffitte. In the 1993 legislative election, he was elected to the National Assembly in the 5th constituency of Yvelines.

Myard made international news when on 17 July 2012, just days before the vote on a new sexual harassment bill, male lawmakers in the National Assembly including Myard hooted and made catcalls as Housing Minister Cécile Duflot, wearing a floral dress, spoke about an architectural project. Myard told L'Express that the hoots were a way of "paying homage to this woman's beauty".

On 5 April 2016, Myard announced a run in the upcoming The Republicans presidential primary; he later failed to gather enough signatures to appear on the ballot.

He lost his seat to Yaël Braun-Pivet of La République En Marche! in the 2017 legislative election. He left The Republicans in 2018 to join Debout la France before returning in 2020.

In the 2024 legislative election, he was jointly invested as a candidate of the National Rally and The Republicans in Yvelines's 5th constituency as part of an agreement brokered by Éric Ciotti. Myard placed third, with 22.9% of the first-round vote.

== Political positions ==
In 2015 Myard visited Damascus with three fellow politicians amid the Syrian civil war, where he met with President Bashar al-Assad and other officials. Myard said he discounted the opinion that the unofficial visit was misguided, stating to be "told not to talk to the devil", but thinking "the devil says clever things".

He further stated that although he was not Bashar al-Assad's "lawyer"—"I do not excuse the massacres", recognising that "the regime used chemical weapons"—he thought "with a diplomacy of morality, we no longer speak to anyone". One of the trip's partakers, Socialist Gérard Bapt, who was the sole participant who refused to meet with Bashar al-Assad, stated the two others, Jean-Pierre Vial and François Zocchetto, were dissatisfied with Myard's attitude following their return to Paris.

Myard has voiced his opposition to same-sex marriage, stating "what I blame [homosexuals] for is having become a lobby, a sect, practicing intellectual terrorism".

He has expressed support for Rattachism.

Following the 2022 legislative election, Myard called for the formation of an electoral alliance between The Republicans, the National Rally and Reconquête in order to counter the new left-wing New People's Ecologist and Social Union (NUPES) alliance.

== See also ==
- List of MPs who lost their seat in the 2017 French legislative election
