= Finistère's 6th constituency =

Constituency of the National Assembly of France

6th constituency of Finistère
- inline Constituency of the National Assembly of France

- Constituency in department

- Finistère in France
- Deputy: Mélanie Thomin; PS
- Department: Finistère
- Cantons: Carhaix-Plouguer, Châteaulin, Châteauneuf-du-Faou, Crozon, Daoulas, Le Faou, Huelgoat, Ouessant, Pleyben

The 6th constituency of Finistère is a French legislative constituency in the Finistère département. Like the other 576 French constituencies, it elects one MP using the two-round system, with a run-off if no candidate receives over 50% of the vote in the first round.

== Historic representation ==
Election	Member	Party
1988	Jean-Yves Cozan	UDF
1993	Jean-Yves Cozan	UDF
1997	Kofi Yamgnane	PS
2002	Christian Ménard	UMP
2007	Christian Ménard	UMP
2012	Richard Ferrand	PS
2017	Richard Ferrand	LREM
2022	Mélanie Thomin	PS
2024	Mélanie Thomin	PS

== Election results ==
=== 2024 ===
Candidate	Party	Alliance	First round			Second round		
Candidate	Party	Alliance	Votes	%	+/–	Votes	%	+/–
Mélanie Thomin	PS	NFP	24,664	37.88	+3.17	38,630	61.83	+10.97
Patrick Le Fur	RN		19,671	30.21	+15.70	23,847	38.17	N/A
Erwan Crouan	DVC	ENS	18,223	27.99	-5.57	WITHDREW		
Tugdal Perennec	DIV		808	1.24	N/A			
Philippe Cordier	LO		753	1.16	+0.19			
Evelyne Carayon	REC		637	0.98	-1.84			
Kenny Delferriere	NPA		360	0.55	N/A			
Valid votes			65,116	97.29	-0.70	62,477	92.57	+1.35
Blank votes			1,294	1.93	+0.51	3,814	5.65	+1.61
Null votes			521	0.78	+0.19	1,203	1.78	-0.26
Turnout			66,931	73.08	+18.01	67,494	73.73	+18.79
Abstentions			24,649	26.92	-18.01	24,043	26.27	-18.79
Registered voters			91,580			91,537		
Source: Ministry of the Interior, Le Monde
Result						PS HOLD		

=== 2022 ===
Legislative Election 2022: Finistère's 6th constituency
Party	Candidate	Votes	%	±%
LREM (Ensemble)	Richard Ferrand	16,526	33.56	-0.37
PS (NUPÉS)	Mélanie Thomin	15,345	31.16	+9.64
RN	Patrick Le Fur	7,146	14.51	+7.57
LR (UDC)	Gaëlle Nicolas	5,218	10.60	−7.50
UDB	Philippe Plouzane	1,500	3.05	N/A
REC	Sophie Broustaut	1,387	2.82	N/A
Others	N/A	2,123	4.31	
Turnout		49,245	55.07	−3.07
2nd round result
PS (NUPÉS)	Mélanie Thomin	23,948	50.85	N/A
LREM (Ensemble)	Richard Ferrand	23,144	49.15	−7.38
Turnout		47,092	54.94	+6.70
PS gain from LREM				

=== 2017 ===
Candidate	Label	First round		Second round	
Candidate	Label	Votes	%	Votes	%
Richard Ferrand	REM	17,230	33.93	20,991	56.53
Gaëlle Nicolas	LR	9,193	18.10	16,140	43.47
Christian Troadec	REG	7,047	13.88		
Jean-Michel Lucas	FI	5,855	11.53		
Nathanaël Legeard	ECO	4,360	8.59		
Patrick Le Fur	FN	3,523	6.94		
Lionel Chabrol	DIV	773	1.52		
Maxime Paul	PCF	711	1.40		
Sophie Rossigneux	DLF	584	1.15		
Bernard Fehringer	DIV	405	0.80		
Robert Béra	DVG	307	0.60		
Élisabeth Piro	EXG	292	0.58		
Catherine Carpentier	DIV	264	0.52		
Jean Queinnec	EXD	233	0.46		
Votes		50,777	100.00	37,131	100.00
Valid votes		50,777	97.83	37,131	86.22
Blank votes		770	1.48	4,327	10.05
Null votes		355	0.68	1,607	3.73
Turnout		51,902	58.14	43,065	48.24
Abstentions		37,372	41.86	46,204	51.76
Registered voters		89,274		89,269	
Source: Ministry of the Interior

=== 2012 ===
2012 legislative election in Finistere's 6th constituency
Candidate	Party	First round		Second round	
Candidate	Party	Votes	%	Votes	%
Richard Ferrand	PS	18,300	32.29%	31,965	58.36%
Dominique Cap	UMP	15,733	27.76%	22,807	41.64%
Christian Troadec	PS dissident–MBP	11,286	19.92%		
Marie-Anne Haas	FN	4,312	7.61%		
Noëlle Péoc'h	FG	2,999	5.29%		
Jocelyne Leclerc	EELV	2,118	3.74%		
Marie Laurent	PCD	636	1.12%		
André Ménesguen	NPA	556	0.98%		
Sophie Rossigneux	DLR	540	0.95%		
Élisabeth Piro	LO	188	0.33%		
Valid votes		56,668	98.79%	54,772	96.79%
Spoilt and null votes		695	1.21%	1,814	3.21%
Votes cast / turnout		57,363	64.17%	56,586	63.33%
Abstentions		32,033	35.83%	32,769	36.67%
Registered voters		89,396	100.00%	89,355	100.00%

=== 2007 ===
Legislative Election 2007: Finistère's 6th constituency
Party	Candidate	Votes	%	±%
UMP	Christian Ménard	24,659	41.39	
PS	Richard Ferrand	15,050	25.26	
DVG	Christian Troadec	7,393	12.41	
MoDem	Catherine Le Moan	5,224	8.77	
Far left	Matthieu Guillemot	2,208	3.71	
DVE	Danielle Lemoine	1,216	2.04	
Others	N/A	3,834		
Turnout		60,434	68.13	
2nd round result
UMP	Christian Ménard	29,903	50.19	
PS	Richard Ferrand	29,673	49.81	
Turnout		61,127	68.92	
UMP hold				

=== 2002 ===
Legislative Election 2002: Finistère's 6th constituency
Party	Candidate	Votes	%	±%
PS	Kofi Yamgnane	18,668	31.16	
UMP	Christian Ménard	14,662	24.48	
DVG	Christian Troadec	6,759	11.28	
DVD	Jean-Yves Cozan	6,167	10.29	
DVD	Dominique Cap	5,673	9.47	
FN	Marie-Anne Haas	2,685	4.48	
LV	Serge Borvon	1,411	2.36	
PCF	Claudine Laporte	1,251	2.09	
Others	N/A	2,629		
Turnout		60,686	70.87	
2nd round result
UMP	Christian Ménard	30,031	50.14	
PS	Kofi Yamgnane	29,865	49.86	
Turnout		61,428	71.75	
UMP gain from PS				

=== 1997 ===
Legislative Election 1997: Finistère's 6th constituency
Party	Candidate	Votes	%	±%
PS	Kofi Yamgnane	21,115	36.66	
UDF	Jean-Yves Cozan	20,255	35.10	
PCF	Daniel Créoff	5,594	9.69	
FN	Eric Calmejane	4,842	8.39	
GE	Robert Beby	2,484	4.30	
Regionalist	Christian Pierre	1,848	3.20	
DVD	Georges Nieto	1,526	2.64	
Turnout		60,117	72.32	
2nd round result
PS	Kofi Yamgnane	33,649	53.75	
UDF	Jean-Yves Cozan	28,957	46.25	
Turnout		65,677	79.03	
PS gain from UDF				

== Sources ==
- Official results of French elections from 1998: "Résultats électoraux officiels en France" (in French). Archived from the original on 20 December 2011.
