= Mélanie Thomin =

French politician

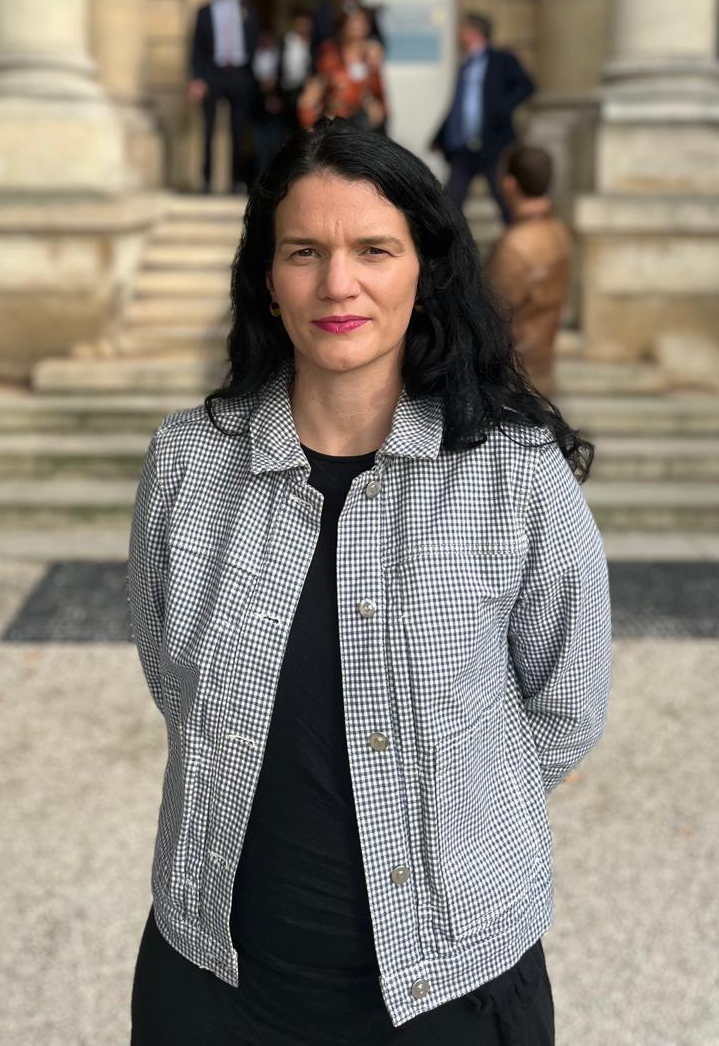
- Thomin in 2024

Member of the National Assembly for Finistère's 6th constituency
- Incumbent
- Assumed office 22 June 2022
- Preceded by: Richard Ferrand

Personal details
- Born: 4 June 1984 (age 42) Landerneau, France
- Party: PS (since 2003)
- Education: University of Western Brittany
- Profession: Teacher

Mélanie Thomin (born 4 June 1984) is a French politician of the Socialist Party (PS) who was elected a Deputy for Finistère's 6th constituency under the NUPES party label during the 2022 French legislative election.

== Early life ==
Thomin was a French language teacher in numerous private high schools in Finistère including Diwan (Breton language) and Le Likès in Quimper (catholique school). Her dad worked for the local public service while her mom worked for the municipal government.

== Political career ==
Thomin began to approach the Socialist Party in 2003 and integrated in its youth movement, the Young Socialist Movement in 2005. She joined UNEF as a student as a student at the University of Brest, and was the president of UNEF-Brest during the 2006 youth protests in France.

She participated in the 2014 municipal elections in Quimper on the list of socialist mayor Bernard Poignant. She was not elected to the municipal council during the original election, but ultimately entered in April 2016 after the resignation of another elected member. She was a candidate in the 2020 municipal election in Hanvec and was elected with the municipal majority as well as to the communauté d'agglomération du pays de Landerneau-Daoulas.

She was a candidate in the 2015 Brittany regional elections in Finistère on a party list directed locally by the socialist candidate Marc Coatanéa, but was the first non-elected candidate on the list. She ran again in 2021 during the regional elections, but once again failed to get elected.

Thomin was a part of Richard Ferrand's electoral campaign during the 2012 legislative election and supported the candidacy of Benoit Hamon during the 2017 presidential election.

=== Member of the National Assembly, 2022–2024 ===
Thomin presented herself in the 2022 French legislative election against Richard Ferrand in Finistère's 6th constituency. She beat the President of the National Assembly in the Second Round with 50.85% of the vote.

Presented as a "novice socialist" by Le Monde, Thomin entered the National Assembly after 20 years of activism for the party.

In 2023, Thomin publicly endorsed the re-election of the Socialist Party's chairman Olivier Faure.

== Electoral results ==
=== Legislative elections ===
Year	Party	Constituency	1st round			2nd round			Result
Year	Party	Constituency	Votes	%	Rank	Votes	%	Rank	Result
2022	PS	Finistère's 6th	15,345	31.16	2nd	23,948	50.85	1st	Elected
2024	PS	Finistère's 6th	24,664	37.88	1st	38,630	61.83	1st	Elected
