= Michel Delpuech =

French high-ranking civil servant

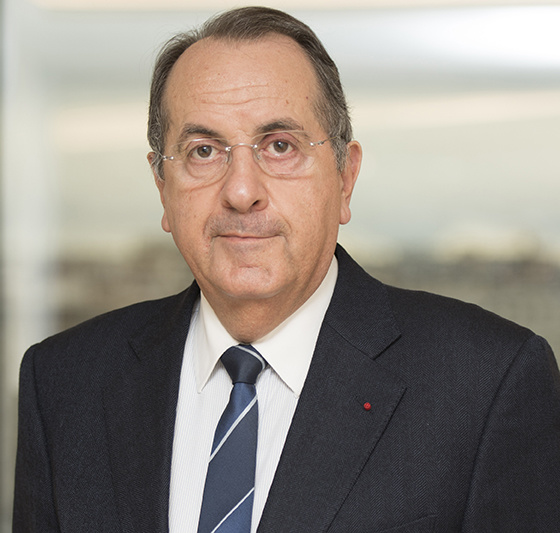

Paris Police Prefet
- In office 19 April 2017 – 20 March 2019
- Preceded by: Michel Cadot
- Succeeded by: Didier Lallement

Personal details
- Born: 13 February 1953 (age 73) Aurillac, France
- Education: Sciences Po, ÉNA
- Profession: Civil servant

Michel Delpuech (born 13 February 1953) is a French high-ranking civil servant. He was the Paris Police Prefet since 19 April 2017, after having been Prefet of Paris.

== Career ==
On 23 July 2018, in the context of the Benalla affair and the 1st of May violences, he was heard by the French National Assembly commission. He answered to the accusations of Gérard Collomb, then Minister of the Interior and refuted any involvement. He denounced abuses linked to what he called cronyism at the top of the state.

He was heard again by the Senate commission on 25 July 2018, where he again refuted any involvement.

He was sacked by the government after the Act XVIII of the yellow vests manifestation in Paris on 16 March 2019.
