= Ludovic Chaker =

French politician and former diplomat

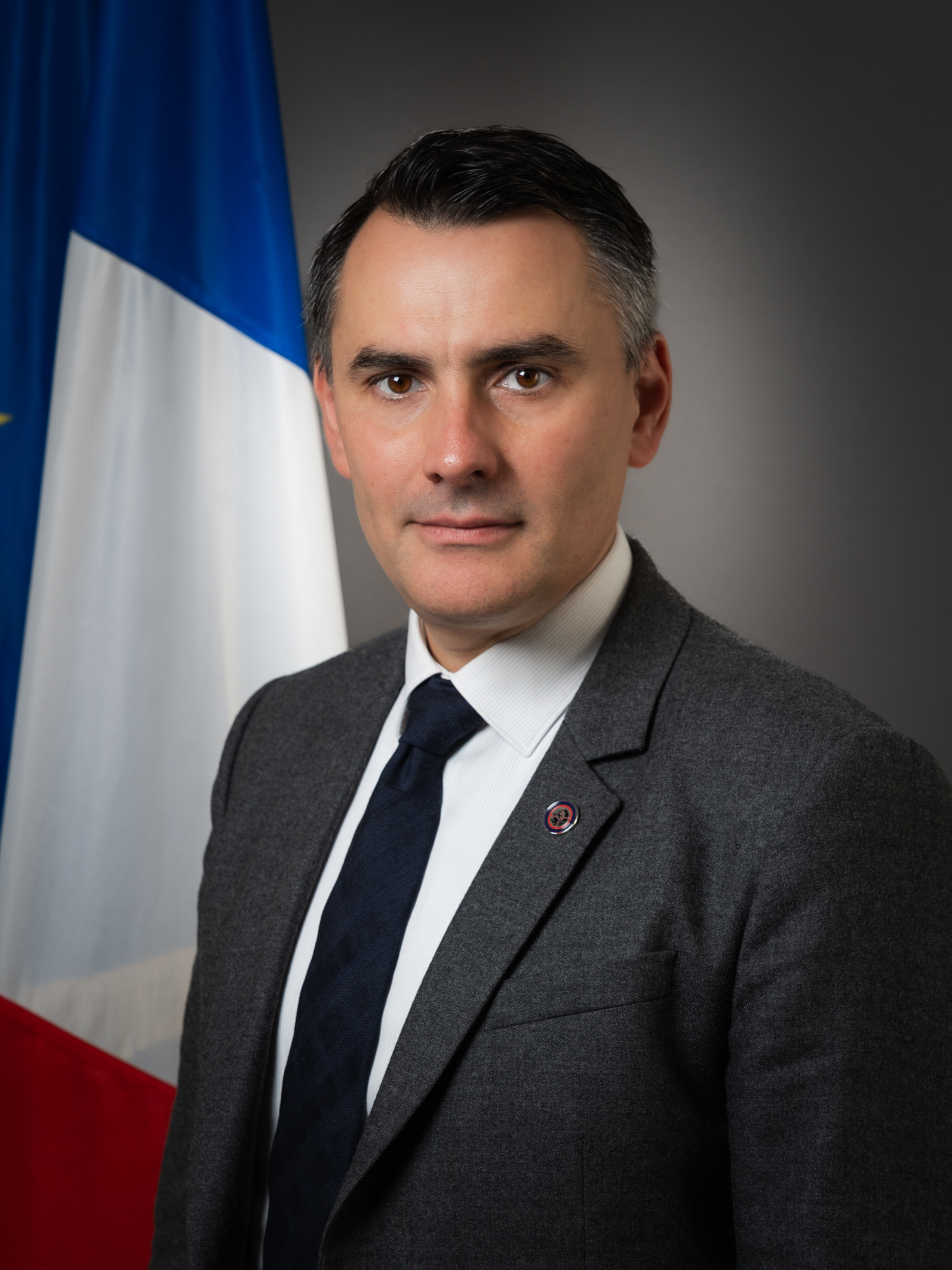
- Ludovic Chaker in 2024

Deputy Delegate General for Armaments
- Incumbent
- Assumed office October 2022

Secretary General of La République En Marche! (2016)

Personal details
- Born: 15 July 1979 (age 47) Saint-Jean-du-Bruel, France
- Education: Paris Nanterre University; Sciences Po; Inalco
- Occupation: Government official, advisor, yoga and martial arts teacher
- Nickname: The Ninja

Ludovic Chaker (born 15 July 1979) is a French government official. A former diplomat and politician, he is chiefly known as a political advisor to French President Emmanuel Macron and the first secretary of his political movement, En Marche!.

He served as a security advisor to the President of the Republic from 2017 to 2022.

He currently serves as Deputy Delegate General for Armaments, in charge of strategic anticipation at the French Ministry of Defence.

In 2025, he published a personal development book, Du Ninja au Yogi (From Ninja to Yogi), inspired by Asian martial traditions and Indian philosophies related to yoga.

== Biography ==
=== Early life ===
Chaker grew up in a humble family based in Saint-Jean-du-Bruel, a village in Aveyron set between the Causses and the Cévennes, in the rugged Dourbie valley.

=== Education ===
After completing his final year of secondary school in Nice and a training period in a Shaolin temple, he graduated in 2002 from the Institut national des langues et civilisations orientales with a degree in Mandarin Chinese and International Relations. He contributed to books focused on modern China, such as Shanghai - Histoire, promenades, anthologie et dictionnaire, directed by Nicolas Idier, in which he writes a chapter on martial arts.

He was admitted to the CELSA where he attended the intercultural management program, while studying political science at the Paris Nanterre University (2003–2004) and human resources and public affairs at Sciences Po.

To finance his studies, he worked successively as a receptionist, model, security guard, and video game tester.

== Career ==
Chaker's career has taken him to the crossroads of military intelligence, public and academic affairs, and politics.

=== Career in academia and public affairs ===
Hired by the French consulate in Shanghai, he was in charge of developing cooperation between French and Chinese universities.

Upon returning to France, he became chief of staff to the mayor of Joué-lès-Tours, a city in which he was also elected.

He was then recruited by Richard Descoings as head of external relations for Asia, the Pacific region, Africa and the Middle-East of Sciences Po.

He then founded a consulting company, Ooda, named after the four phases (observe–orient–decide–act) of the military OODA loop.

=== Political career ===
==== Independent MP candidate ====
In 2012, he ran as an independent left-wing candidate for the MP seat of the Eleventh constituency for French residents overseas, that includes 49 countries in Asia and Oceania. He campaign included meeting French people via couch surfing with them in Thailand. He received 1.99% of the votes.

===== First general secretary of En Marche! =====
In 2015 he joined Emmanuel Macron's team and became the first general secretary of his party, En Marche! and its first official employee. He was then appointed as deputy general secretary and coordinator of Macron's campaign operations for the 2017 French presidential election. He was often described as a senior staffer in the candidate's team and one of its closest advisors, earning the nickname of "ninja of logistics".

===== Advisor to the French President =====
After the election of Macron to the presidency, Chaker was appointed to the Military Staff of the President. Several media outlets identified him as close to Alexandre Benalla and compared him to the character of intelligence officer Malotru in the TV series The Bureau - a comparison reinforced by the fact that Chaker speaks Arabic fluently after living in Cairo.

Following the appointment of a new Chief of Staff to the President of the Republic on July 7, 2020, he became advisor to the President on strategic defense and security issues until October 2022.

=== Military career ===
==== Deputy Delegate General for Armaments ====
On October 5, 2022, he was appointed Deputy Director of Strategic Anticipation for the Delegate General for Armaments, at the proposal of the Minister for the Armed Forces in the Council of Ministers.

He developed the strategic function of knowledge, understanding, and anticipation within the Direction générale de l'armement, with responsibility for emerging threats, cognitive warfare, and countering information manipulation in France and abroad, and contributed to the Red Team Défense and RADAR programs.

==== Arms Officers' Corps ====
An officer in the Arms Officers' Corps Operational Reserve since 2004, he has been promoted regularly, becoming:

- Lieutenant in 2006
- Captain in 2011
- Commander in 2018

In 2013, he attended the training course of the École supérieure des officiers de réserve spécialistes d'état-major (ESORSEM), attached to the École de guerre.

He was subsequently assigned as a reserve officer to the Commandement des opérations spéciales (COS), in the "J9" office responsible for civil-military actions, before joining the 44th Infantry Regiment, a unit traditionally attached to the Directorate-General for External Security (DGSE).

In 2020, along with several gendarmerie officers, he became an auditor at the Institut des hautes études de Défense nationale (IHEDN).

Distinctions

As part of his service in the reserve, he received several decorations, including:

- National Defence Medal, bronze level
- Medal for Voluntary Military Service
- As well as non-public decorations awarded for external operations

=== Martial arts and yoga ===
Ludovic Chaker was taught kung-fu by master Liang Chaoqun, a proponent of the Zi Ran Men or "natural style". He then joined the leadership of the French Wan Laisheng association and authored several publications devoted to the history of martial arts. Trained in India, he also taught traditional hatha yoga.

== Publications and interventions ==
In 2025, he published a personal development book, Du Ninja au Yogi (From Ninja to Yogi), inspired by both Asian martial traditions and Indian philosophies related to yoga, in which he explores themes of personal balance, discipline, and inner quest.

He regularly speaks in France and abroad on issues related to strategic affairs, the anticipation of emerging threats, and technological disruptions, in both academic and professional contexts.

- (fr) Ludovic Chaker, From Ninja to Yogi, Self-published, December 2025.
- (fr) Ludovic Chaker, Jean-Baptiste Colas, Alexandre Lahousse, Enhancing Sovereignty: Entering the Era of Strategic Power, National Defence Review, June 2025.
- (fr) Ludovic Chaker, Jean-Baptiste Colas and Noémie Gélis, Strategic Anticipation and Innovation: Navigating Uncertainty to Build the Future of Defence, Combats Futurs, Journal of the Command for Future Combat, June 2025.
- (fr) Ludovic Chaker, Tsiporah Fried, DGA NG Prepares for the Future, National Defence Review, December 2024.
- (fr) Ludovic Chaker and Jean-Baptiste Colas, "Faced with the multiplication of threats, civilians and the military can together forge the defense of tomorrow", FigaroVox, Le Figaro, November 2024.
