= Ismaël Emelien =

French political advisor

Special advisor to the President of France
- In office 2017–2019
- President: Emmanuel Macron

Personal details
- Born: 9 March 1987 (age 39) Grenoble, France
- Education: Sciences Po

Ismaël Emelien (born 9 March 1987) is a French political advisor. He co-founded En Marche! and served as President Emmanuel Macron's special advisor for strategy, communication and speeches.

== Early life and education ==
Emelien was born 9 March 1987 in Grenoble. He has a sister, Marie. He graduated from Sciences Po in 2010.

== Career ==
Emelien worked on Dominique Strauss-Kahn's campaign during the 2006 Socialist Party primary of the 2007 presidential election. Strauss-Kahn lost to Ségolène Royal (who lost to President Nicolas Sarkozy in the general election).

Shortly afterward, Emelien joined Fondation Jean-Jaurès, where he worked for Gilles Finchelstein and co-edited a book with Julia Cagé. He subsequently worked for Euro RSCG, a PR firm now known as Havas Worldwide. He worked on Nicolás Maduro's campaign in 2013.

Emelien first met Macron in 2009. He later worked for him at the French Ministry for the Economy and Finance. In 2016, Emelien quit his job at the ministry and co-founded En Marche!. He advised Macron during the 2017 French presidential campaign. He worked with Liegey Muller Pons, an electoral strategy start-up, and Proxem, a linguistics analysis start-up.

Emelien was appointed as President Macron's special advisor for strategy, communication and speeches, on 14 May 2017.

In July 2018, Emelien's name was mentioned in the Benalla affair. He was suspected of having taken custody of video surveillance recordings illegally given to Alexandre Benalla by three police officers.

On February 11, 2019, Emelien announced his resignation as President Macron's special advisor to Le Point.

== Other activities ==
- European Council on Foreign Relations (ECFR), Member

== Works ==
- Cagé, Julia; Emelien, Ismaël, eds. (2012). Repenser l'action publique. Paris: Fondation Jean Jaurès. ISBN 9782362440441. OCLC 800526944.
