= Christian Ménard =

French politician (born 1946)

Member of the National Assembly for Finistère's 6th constituency
- In office 2002–2012
- Preceded by: Kofi Yamgnane
- Succeeded by: Richard Ferrand

Personal details
- Born: 7 April 1946 (age 80) Quimper, France
- Party: UMP
- Education: University of Nantes
- Profession: Physician

Christian Ménard (born 7 April 1946 in Quimper, Finistère) is a member of the National Assembly of France. He represents the Finistère department, and is a member of the Union for a Popular Movement.
