= Bruno Roger-Petit =

French journalist

- Born: 30 September 1962 (age 63); France
- Education: Diplômé de l'Institut d'études politiques de Paris (section " Service public ", 1987), he is also Master in droit public.
- Occupation: Journalist
- Known for: French journalist of television, writer for radio
- Notable work: Chroniqueur of Touche pas à mon Poste, Presenter of #BRP on Sport365 TV.

Bruno Roger-Petit (born 30 September 1962) is a French journalist of television, print and radio.

Formerly of France Television, he contributed to the website Lepost.fr (which ceased publication in 2012) and also at the website nouvelobs.com. He was a regular consultant of the TV news show Sport et news on i-Tele, and he ran the sports show BRP HD on Sport24.com. He was also a presenter of the TV sports program #BRP on the channel Sport365 TV.

He was appointed as spokesperson to President Emmanuel Macron in August 2017.

== Biography ==
A graduate of the Institute of Political Studies in Paris (section " Service public ", 1987), he also holds a Masters in Public law.

He started on TV at channel Antenne 2 in 1988. He was a grand reporter of domestic politics (1988–1994) and was a news presenter of the TV shows Télématin and Journal of the night (1994–1998). While in this last position, he was noted for having a TV news presentation style that was rather offbeat and impertinent. For example, on 19 October 1997 he finished the news by throwing his notes on the floor. Following a magazine interview in the magazine Technikart, published in October 1998, in which he discussed some editorial decisions on his shows, he was dismissed.

He then presented a programme on France 5, Ça me regarde, produced by Jean-Luc Delarue, before hosting the show Langue de p… . on the radio station BFM.

In late 2003, he was the editor of the free magazine Sport for its first three numbers and he was also a voice between October 2005 and May 2006 in the game show on France 2 Tout vu tout lu, a show devoted to news and hosted by Marie-Ange Nardi.

He was also a columnist for the show J'ai mes sources on France Inter.

He also co-edited in 1998 for the magazine Envoyé spécial a story about Michel Sardou, Histoires de France .

Since June 2008 he has hosted Langues de Sport between 10 am and 12 pm and Le Grand journal du sport between 12h and 13h on Europe 1 Sport from Monday to Friday (99.9) .

On 20 July 2008, while on the air at Europe 1, he admitted to being the author of the blogs François-Mitterrand-2007, François-Mitterrand-2008 and the book François Mitterrand in 2008, il revient.... The blog François-Mitterrand-2007, by making posthumous commentary on the 2007 presidential campaign by former President of the Republic, François Mitterrand, aroused many reactions and rumors about the identity of its author among the French political class.

In September 2014, he was a columnist in the show Touche pas à mon poste !, on D8, and he hosted on TV channel, sport365, the sports programme #BRP.

On 29 August 2017 he was appointed as a spokesperson for President Emmanuel Macron.

== Works ==
- 2008 : François Mitterrand 2008, il revient..., éd. Ramsay, published anonymously.
- 2011 : Authentiquement français, éd. Héloïse d'Ormesson
