= François-Xavier Lauch =

French civil servant (born 1981)

Prefect of Hérault
- Incumbent
- Assumed office 9 October 2023
- Preceded by: Hugues Moutouh

Personal details
- Born: 10 December 1981 (age 44)

François-Xavier Lauch (born 10 December 1981) is a French civil servant who has been serving as prefect of Hérault since 2023. From 2022 to 2023, he served as prefect of Tarn. From 2020 to 2022, he served as deputy chief of staff to interior minister Gérald Darmanin. From 2017 to 2020, he served as chef de cabinet to president Emmanuel Macron.
