= Karim Achoui =

French-Algerian lawyer (born 1967)

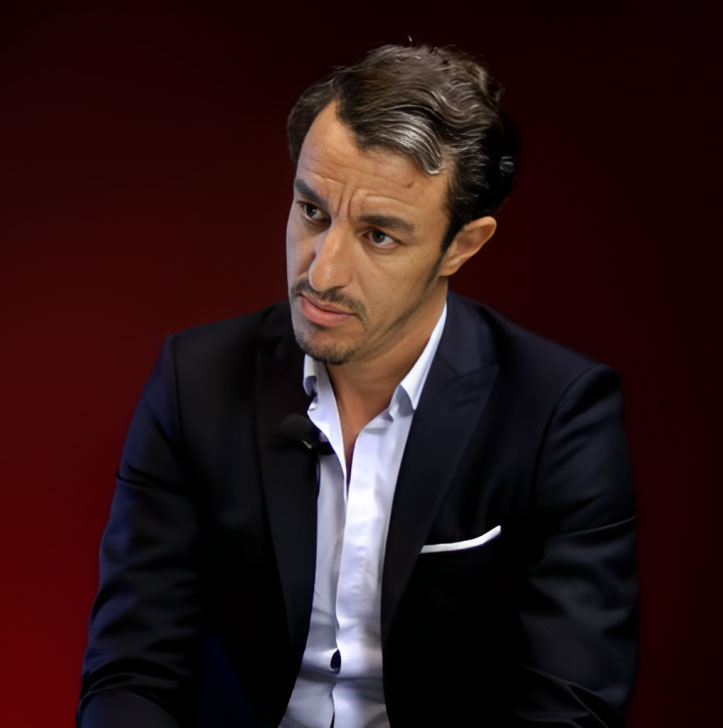
- Karim Achoui
- Born: 1967 (age 58–59); Boulogne-Billancourt, France
- Other names: "Avocat des voyous" (Advocate of thugs)
- Education: Studied medicine and law
- Occupation: Lawyer
- Years active: 1993–present
- Employer: Own law firm
- Known for: Alleged connections with the French milieu and mafia, involvement in high-profile cases, founding the League of Judicial Defense of Muslims
- Notable work: Defense in significant legal cases, including that of Patrick Dils and Sami Naceri

Karim Achoui (born 1967) is a French-Algerian lawyer.

He is notable for his alleged connections with the French milieu, the French mafia, and for his involvement in several significant cases, which have earned him the nickname "avocat des voyous," or advocate of thugs in the media.

He is the founder of the League of Judicial Defense of Muslims (Ligue de défense judiciaire des musulmans in French). Boulogne-Billancourt

== Early life and education ==
Karim Achoui was born in Boulogne-Billancourt into a modest home. His mother was a wet nurse or nanny, and his father was an employee at Renault, an automobile company. Both his parents were from Algeria. He studied medicine and law simultaneously before choosing to pursue law and prepare for a career as an attorney. He began practicing as a criminal defense lawyer in 1993 in Paris.

== Career ==
Karim Achoui began his legal career at the Court of Paris in January 1993. He began working with his former lecturer, Jean-Marc Florand, who was known for serving on the benches of Paris-Est Créteil Val-de-Marne University.

In his office, Karim Achoui worked on some of Jacque Vergès' cases, including the case of Patrick Dils, a man convicted of killing two children in 1989 and was sentenced to life in prison. After new evidence resurfaced, Dils was later acquitted on April 24, 2002.

Achoui started his own firm in 2000 and won several cases that were highly publicized, including the acquittals of Michel "Le Gros" Lepage, a heavyweight for a gang in the South side, and Marc "Le Forain" Hornec, one of the three brothers of the influential Montreuil-sous-Bois family. Achoui also represented several Islamists, which aroused the interest of the Directorate of Territorial Surveillance.

Among Achoui's clients were Karl Zéro, Jamel Debbouze, Richard Gasquet, the Hornec brothers, Romane Bohringer, Farid Khider et Christine Chauvet.

In November 2006, Achoui defended Sami Naceri, an actor and producer who had thrown an ashtray at a stylist in a bar a year previously. In 2007, the actor was sentenced to 10 months in prison.

== Assassination attempt ==
Karim Achoui was shot twice while leaving his office in Paris on June 22, 2007. He was admitted to the Georges-Pompidou European Hospital where he spent two weeks recovering before being permitted to leave.

Shortly before the attack, he allegedly told the president of the Paris Bar Association that he was being investigated and his office had been infiltrated by police. He was quoted as saying (in French), "On June 4, I was informed that one of my secretaries was acting as an informant to the police. I informed the bâtonnier and dismissed the secretary. I am convinced that the attack against me is connected to this infiltration."

Four men were eventually arrested for the attack. One of them, Ruddy Terranova, was proved to be a police informant. Achoui positively identified him as the shooter. The other three men were determined to be intermediaries and a part of organized crime.
