= University of Western Brittany =

Public university in Brest, France

- Université de Bretagne Occidentale
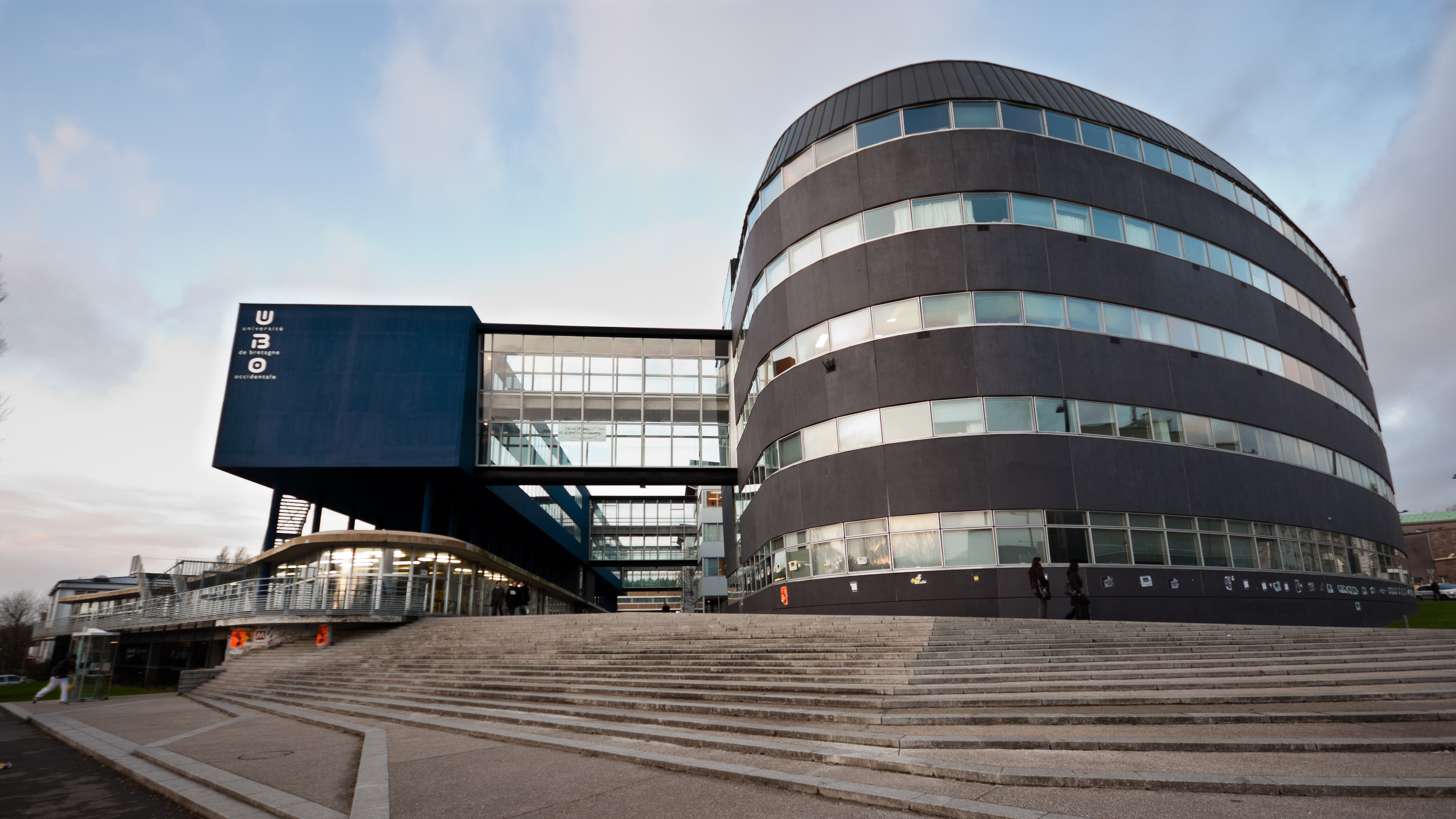
- Type: Public
- Established: 1971
- President: Pascal Olivard
- Students: 23,000
- Location: Brest, Bretagne, France; 48°23′56″N 4°29′56″W
- Campus: Brest, Quimper, Morlaix
- Nickname: UBO
- Website: http://www.univ-brest.fr/GB/

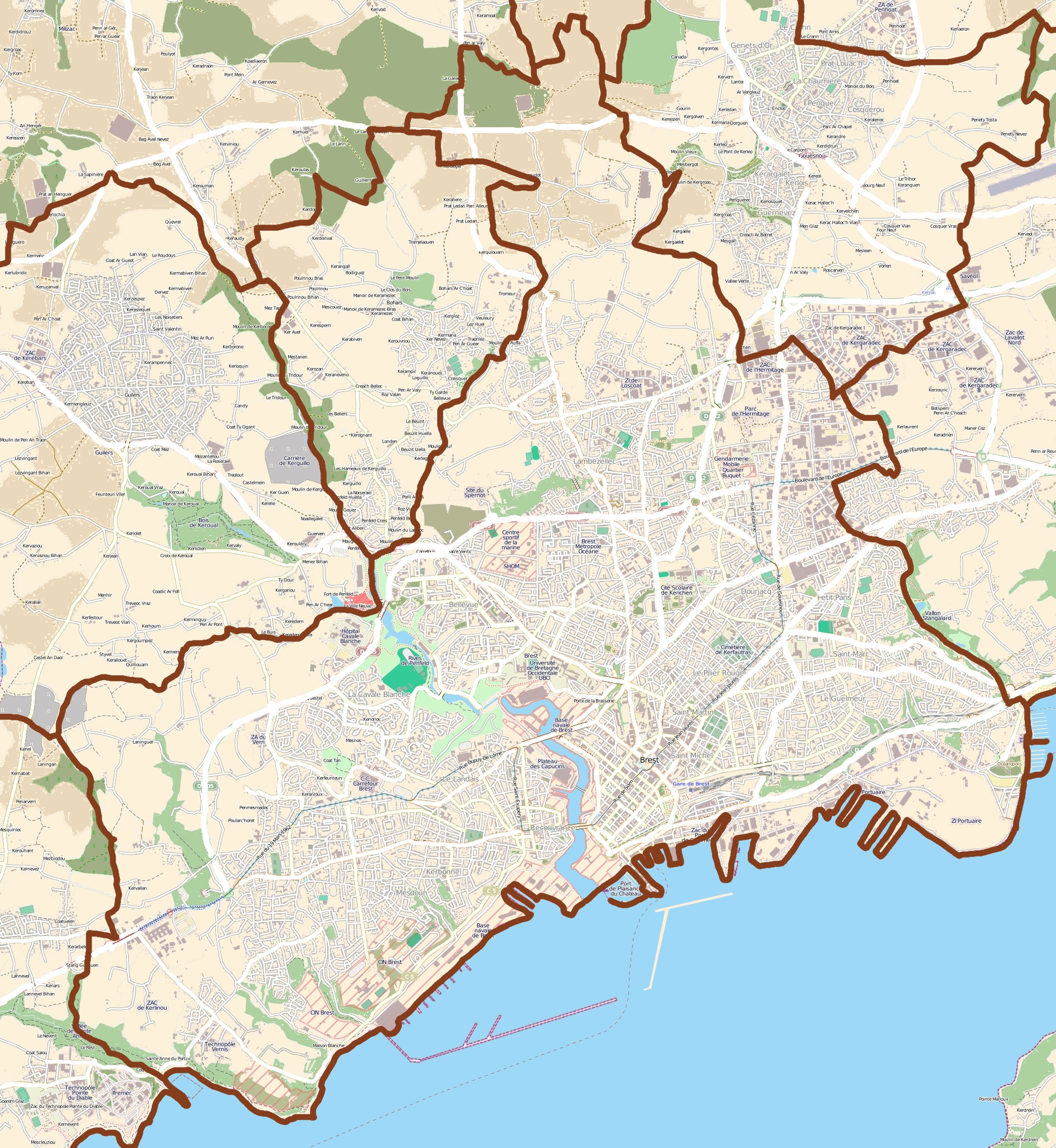
- Location in Brest

The University of Western Brittany (French: Université de Bretagne-Occidentale; UBO; Breton: Skol-Veur Breizh-Izel) is a French university, located in Brest, in the Academy of Rennes. On a national scale, in terms of graduate employability, the university oscillates between 18th and 53rd out of 69 universities depending on fields of study. Overall, the university is ranked 12th out of 76 universities in France.

== Location ==
The University of Western Brittany is in Brittany, on the north-western coast of France. It is a multicampus university, with the main site in Brest and satellite campuses in Quimper and Morlaix. Brest is an hour from Paris by air, or four hours by train. Brest is one of the world's marine science capitals and is home to 60% of French marine researchers, as well as several major organizations such as IFREMER and IPEV. The city is also famous for its sailing activities. Brittany's economic development is driven by the agri-food, health, and telecommunications sectors.

== Academics ==
French universities function via a system of collegiate administration. Each institution is led by a team of lecturer-researchers and overseen by a president, bringing together representatives from all affiliated faculties and institutes, as well as student-elected delegates. Universities are chiefly financed by the French government.

=== List of faculties and schools ===
6 faculties

- Humanities and Social Sciences
- Science and Technology
- Law, Economics and Management
- Education and Sports Sciences
- Medicine and Health Sciences
- Dentistry

7 specialized institutes

- Institut Universitaire de Technologie de Brest (IUT),
- Institut Universitaire de Technologie de Quimper (IUT),
- Institut d’Administration des Entreprises (IAE) in Morlaix,
- Institut Universitaire Européen de la Mer (IUEM),
- École supérieure du professorat et de l'éducation (ESPE),
- Euro Institut d’Actuariat (EURIA),
- Institut de Formation en Masso-Kinésithérapie (IFMK), in partnership with the University Hospital of Brest.

1 engineering school

- École Supérieure d’Ingénieurs en Agroalimentaire de Bretagne atlantique (ESIAB)

1 midwifery school

- École de sage-femme, in partnership with the University Hospital of Brest.

=== International collaboration ===
The university is an active member of the University of the Arctic. UArctic is an international cooperative network based in the Circumpolar Arctic region, consisting of more than 200 universities, colleges, and other organizations with an interest in promoting education and research in the Arctic region.

The university also participates in UArctic's mobility program north2north. The aim of that program is to enable students of member institutions to study in different parts of the North.

== Research ==
French research is essentially academic in nature, encompassing the work of university laboratories and their partner organisations. UBO is home to 37 laboratories, some of which are supported by prestigious French research bodies, such as CNRS, INSERM, and IRD. There are four principal areas of research at UBO :

- Marine Sciences
- Health, Agrifood and Materials
- Maths-ICT
- Humanities and Social Sciences

== Notable people ==
=== Alumni ===
- Philippe Collin, anchor for France Inter radio
- (France) Benoît Hamon, politician and former minister of National Education
- (France) François Cuillandre, politician and former mayor of the city of Brest
- Didier Le Gac, politician and member of the National Assembly of France for the city of Brest
- (France) Joëlle Bergeron, politician and former member of the Europarliament
- (France) Christophe Miossec, musician and singer
- (France) Tristan Nihouarn, musician and singer
- (France) Christian Gourcuff, former football player and manager
- (France) Paul Le Guen, former football player and manager
- (France) Chantal Conand, marine biologist
- (Togo) Kofi Yamgnane, politician and engineer

=== Faculty ===
- (Spain) Fátima Rodríguez (b. 1961), writer, translator
- Françoise Conan was elected President of Femmes et Sciences in 2024

== See also ==
- List of public universities in France by academy
