= Place de la Contrescarpe =

Square in Paris, France

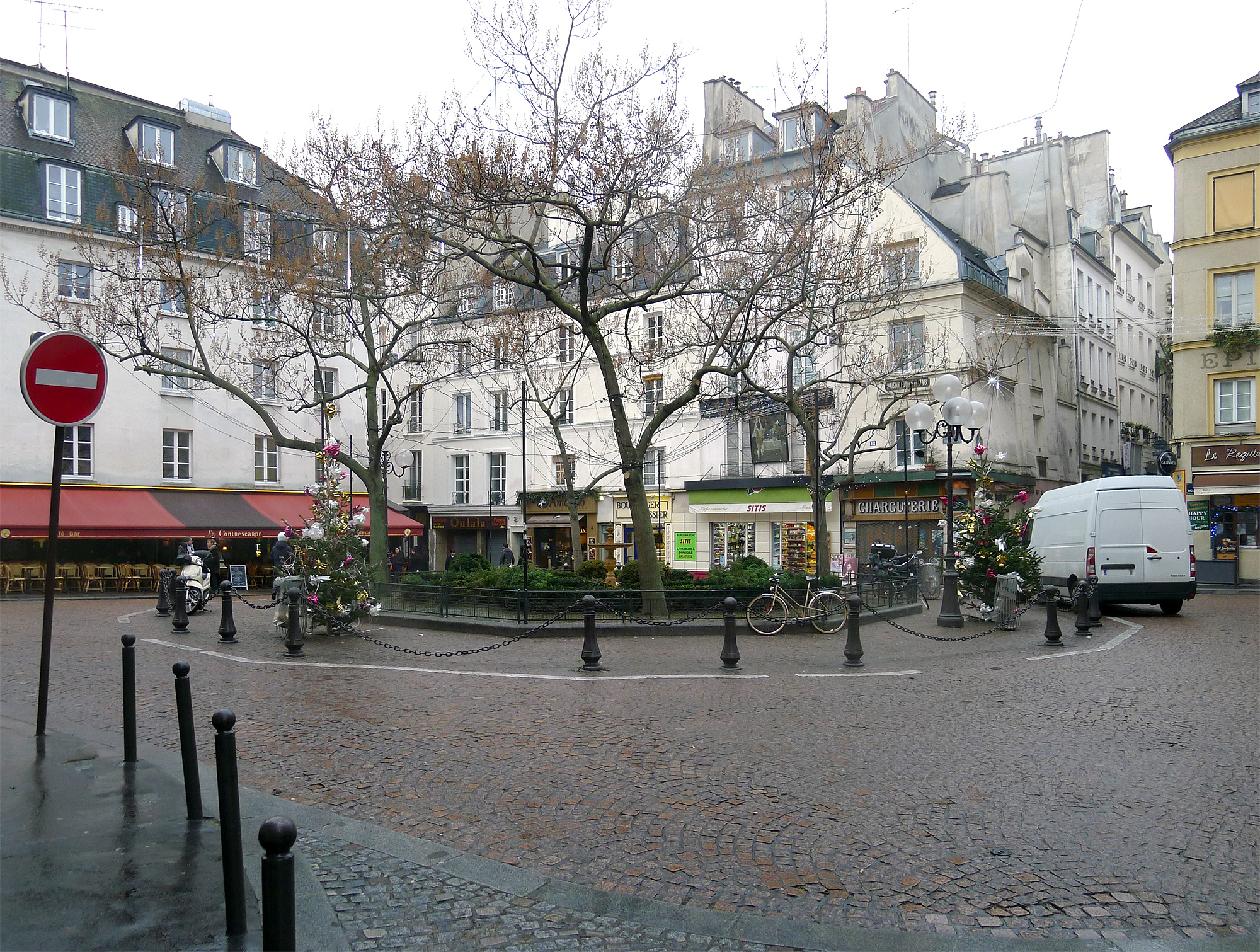
- General view

- Location within Paris
- Arrondissement: 5th
- Coordinates: 48°50′40″N 2°20′58″E

Construction
- Inauguration: 1852

The Place de la Contrescarpe (French pronunciation: [plas d(ə) la kɔ̃tʁɛskaʁp]) is a square in the 5th arrondissement of Paris.

== Location and access ==
The Place de la Contrescarpe is located along the Rue Mouffetard, at the end of the Rue Lacépède and the Rue du Cardinal-Lemoine. It is at the center of four administrative quartiers or districts; Saint-Victor, Jardin-des-Plantes, Val-de-Grâce and Sorbonne, making it a central point of the 5th arrondissement.

It has a diameter of around forty metres (130 feet) and has a circular traffic island in the middle, which is partly occupied by a public fountain.

Now popular with tourists, it contains many cafés, mostly recent. However, the facades of some buildings still show signs of the square as it used to be.

== Name history ==
The square takes its name from the area around the former Rue de la Contrescarpe-Saint-Marcel, now shared between the Rue Blainville and the Rue du Cardinal-Lemoine, which made reference to the word contrescarpe (counterscarp in English), the embankment outside the ditch in front of the Wall of Philip II Augustus.

Ernest Hemingway makes mention of it in his book A Moveable Feast, as he lived for a time just off this square at 74 Rue du Cardinal Lemoine. Between 1928 and 1930, George Orwell lived on the nearby Rue de Pot-du-Fer and writes of the Place de la Contrescarpe in his novel Down and Out in Paris and London.

== History ==
Opened in 1852, it was formed by the removal of a cluster of houses between the Rue du Cardinal-Lemoine, Rue Lacépède and Rue Mouffetard. This cluster would today be located adjacent to the café Les Arts, that is, around the eastern part of the square.
