= Kofi Yamgnane =

French politician (born 1945)

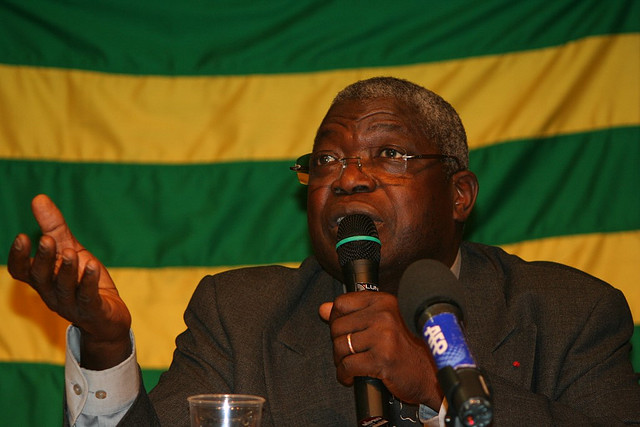
- Kofi Yamgnane in 2009

Secretary of State for Integration
- In office 1991–1993
- President: François Mitterrand
- Prime Minister: Édith Cresson; Pierre Bérégovoy

Member of the National Assembly for Finistère's 6th constituency
- In office 1997–2002
- Preceded by: Jean-Yves Cozan
- Succeeded by: Christian Ménard

Mayor of Saint-Coulitz
- In office 1989–2001

Personal details
- Born: 11 October 1945 (age 80) Bassar, Togo
- Party: Socialist Party
- Education: University of Western Brittany; École des mines de Nancy

Kofi Martin Yamgnane (born 11 October 1945) is a French-Togolese politician and engineer.

== Biography ==
Yamgnane was born in 1945 in Bassar, Togo. A member of the Bassar ethnic group in central Togo, he attended a missionary school as his early education. In 1957, he enrolled at the St. Joseph College in Lomé, capital of Togo. Yamgnane received his baccalauréat in 1964. Afterward, he moved to France to study engineering. He obtained a degree in mathematics from the University of Western Brittany in 1969. Yamgnane obtained French citizenship in 1975. After years of doing engineering work without qualifications, such as designing expressway structures, he enrolled at the École nationale supérieure des mines de Nancy in 1977 and graduated in 1981.

In 1983, he joined the town council of a village of Brittany, Saint-Coulitz (less than 400 inhabitants). He lost the election for mayor in the second round as a member of the Socialist Party. He became well known in France in 1989 after being elected mayor of Saint-Coulitz, and at this time, one out of only two black mayors in Metropolitan France. He created a council of elders, similar to governing bodies in Africa. This initiative won Yamgnane the "National Award of citizenship" in April 1990, and he was named "Breton of the year" by Armor Magazine.

A former engineer in the French Bridges and Roads administration, he was Secretary of State of Integration in the French government from 1991 to 1993. The following year, he was elected a Conseiller général of Finistère. Yamgnane became a representative in the French National Assembly on 1 June 1997, representing Finistère. He was a member of the delegation of the National Assembly to women's rights and equal opportunities between men and women. Yamagnane served on several commissions in the Assembly, including national defense, trade, cultural affairs, finance, constitutional laws, marine transport safety, and children's rights. His term ended on 18 June 2002.

After the death of Togolese president Gnassingbe Eyadema in 2005, Yamgnane thought of running for president but decided it was not the right time. He stood as a candidate in the 2010 Togolese presidential election. Yamgnane campaigned on improving the health of Togolese, fixing roads and bridges, reducing unemployment, and curbing corruption. He aimed to nationalize lage industries without creating "a witch hunt". However, his candidacy was rejected by the Constitutional Court due to doubts about his identity. His papers showed two different birth dates, 11 October 1945, and 31 December 1945. The October 11 date comes from an affidavit signed by his father on 16 March 1948, while the 31 December date is used by the Togolese government. "All Togolese know around them at least one person in my case. Does this mean that this whole section of the population should be excluded from universal suffrage?" Yamgnane said.

He was arrested in October 2014 on the charge of "influence peddling" and tax evasion in the context of the Christophe Rocancourt case.

== Personal life ==
Yamgnane is married to Anne-Marie la Bretonne, a retired professor of mathematics. They live in Lomé and have two children. He is friends with Togolese archbishop Denis Amouzou, as the two share an affinity for scouting.
