= Renaissance (French political party) =

- Abbreviation: RE
- General Secretary: Gabriel Attal
- Honorary President: Emmanuel Macron
- Leader in the National Assembly: Gabriel Attal
- Leader in the Senate: Vacancy
- Founder: Emmanuel Macron
- Founded: 6 April 2016; 10 years ago; 17 September 2022; 4 years ago (as Renaissance)
- Split from: Socialist Party; The Republicans
- Headquarters: 68, Rue du Rocher; 75008 Paris
- Youth wing: Les Jeunes en marche
- Membership (June 2025): ▲33,154
- Ideology: Liberalism (French)
- Political position: Centre to centre-right
- National affiliation: Ensemble
- European Parliament group: Renew Europe
- Colours: Navy (official); Yellow (customary)
- Anthem: Freedom justice brotherhood
- National Assembly: 87 / 577
- Senate: 14 / 348
- European Parliament: 5 / 81
- Presidency of departmental councils: 2 / 95
- Presidency of regional councils: 1 / 17

Website
- parti-renaissance.fr
- Politics of France; Political parties; Elections; A: Along with centre-right, the party has also been described as radical centrist, right-wing, and historically as a big tent/catch-all party.

Renaissance (RE) is a political party in France that is typically described as liberal and centrist or centre-right. The party was originally known as En Marche ! (EM) (Note: French: [ɑ̃ maʁʃ] In French, exclamation marks are preceded by a space. English-language media typically omit the space.) and later La République En Marche ! (transl. The Republic on the Move), LREM, LaREM or REM), before adopting its current name in September 2022. RE is the leading force of the centrist Ensemble coalition, coalesced around Emmanuel Macron's original presidential majority.

The party was established on 6 April 2016 by Macron, a former Minister of the Economy, Industry and Digital Affairs, who was later elected president in the 2017 presidential election with 66.1% of the second-round vote. Subsequently, the party ran candidates in the 2017 legislative election, including dissidents from the Socialist Party (PS) and the Republicans (LR), as well as minor parties, winning an absolute majority in the National Assembly. Macron was re-elected in the 2022 presidential election, but the party lost its absolute majority in the 2022 legislative election, and subsequently its relative majority too after the snap elections called by Macron two years later. Following these, the party has formed multiple minority governments with LR.

Macron conceived RE as a progressive movement, uniting both left and right. RE supports pro-Europeanism and globalization and wants to "modernise and moralise" French politics. The party has accepted members from other political parties at a higher rate than other parties in France, and does not impose any fees on members who want to join. The party has been a founding member of Renew Europe, the political group of the European Parliament representing liberals and centrists, since June 2019.

== History ==
=== Foundation ===
La Gauche Libre, the think tank for the movement, was declared as an organization on 1 March 2015. Afterwards, lesjeunesavecmacron.fr was registered as a domain on 23 June 2015. Eventually, two Facebook pageswere created and an extra domain registered. Another organization was eventually created by Macron, declared as L'Association pour le renouvellement de la vie politique and registered as a micro-party in January 2016. This was following en-marche.fr being claimed as a domain. L'Association pour le renouvellement de la vie politique was then registered as EMA EN MARCHE in March 2016.

En Marche! was established on 6 April 2016 in Amiens by Emmanuel Macron, then aged 38, with the help of political advisor Ismaël Emelien. The initials of the name of the party are the same as the initials of Macron's name.

The announcement of En Marche! was the first indication by Macron that he was planning to run for President, with Macron using En Marche! to fundraise for the potential presidential run. The launch of the party was widely covered throughout the media and media coverage continued to peak as tensions rose among Macron and other government ministers as his loyalty was questioned. In the weeks following the creation of En Marche!, Macron soared in the opinion polls, coming to be seen as the main competitor on the left.

The creation of En Marche! was welcomed by several political figures including Najat Vallaud-Belkacem, Jean-Pierre Raffarin and Pierre Gattaz, although it was also criticised by Jean-Luc Mélenchon and Christian Estrosi.

In an attempt to create the party's first campaign platform, Macron and head of operations Ludovic Chaker recruited 4,000 volunteers to conduct door-to-door surveys of 100,000 people, using the information gained to create a programme closer to the French electorate.

Later that year, Chaker structured the movement and became the first general secretary of Emmanuel Macron's party En Marche! and its first official employee. He was then appointed as deputy general secretary and coordinator of Macron's campaign operations for the 2017 French presidential election.

=== 2017 legislative election ===
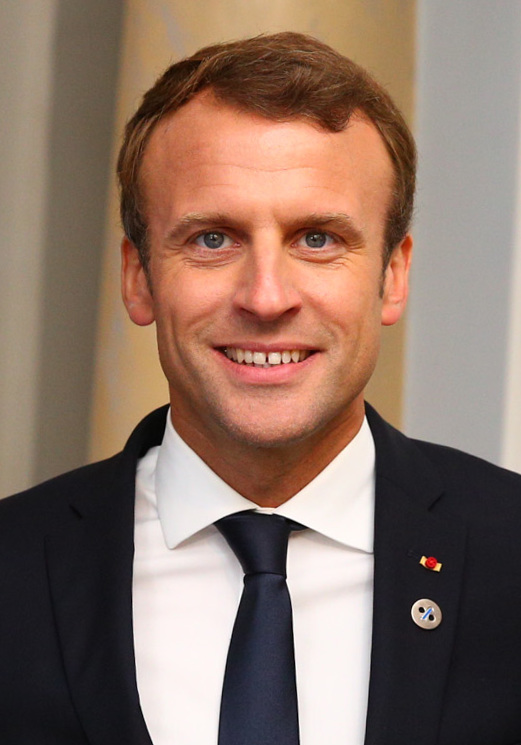
Emmanuel Macron

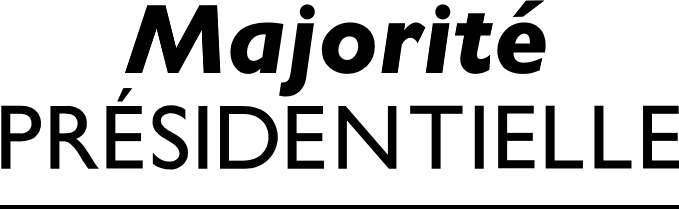
Logo of the Presidential Majority coalition of LaREM, MoDem and other liberal and centrist parties

La République En Marche! ran candidates in most constituencies. At least half its candidates came from civil society, the other half having previously held political office and half were women. Candidates could not be selected for more than one constituency. In addition to those parameters, Macron specified in his initial press conference on 19 January that he would require that candidates demonstrate probity (disqualifying any prospective candidates with a criminal record), political plurality (representing the threads of the movement) and efficacy. Those wishing to seek the endorsement of LREM had to sign up online and the movement received nearly 15,000 applications.

When dealing with nominations sought by those in the political world, the party considered the popularity, establishment and media skills of applicants, with the most difficult cases adjudicated by Macron himself. To present themselves under the label of La République En Marche!, outgoing deputies had to leave the Socialist Party (PS) or the Republicans (LR). Macron previously said the legislative candidates would have to leave the PS before they could join LREM, though on 5 May 2017 Macron waived this requirement. However, then-spokesperson of LREM Christophe Castaner later said they could stay in the PS as long as they supported Macron. Moreover, spokesperson Jean-Paul Delevoye said the members of civil society could be mayors or members of regional councils and departmental councils.

After François Bayrou endorsed Macron in February, the Democratic Movement (MoDem), which he leads, reserved 90 constituencies for MoDem candidates (running under the label of La République En Marche!), of which 50 were reported by Le Figaro to be winnable.

On 15 May 2017, the secretary general of the presidency announced the appointment of Édouard Philippe, a member of LR, as Prime Minister.

On 18 June 2017, La République En Marche! won an absolute majority in the National Assembly, securing 308 seats (or 53% of the seats) while collecting only 28.21% of the vote on the first round, and 43.06% on the second round. Additionally, MoDem secured 42 seats. LREM became France's party of power, in support of the President.

=== 2017 Senate election and first party congress ===
In the 2017 Senate election, La République En Marche! lost seats, ending up with 21, seven fewer than before. While hoping to double its representatives in the Senate, party officials noted that due to the electoral system of indirect universal suffrage, where deputies, senators and regional councilors elect senators, the party had a disadvantage due to being new.

In the same month, it was announced that the first party congress was to be held in Lyon. The first gathering of party members and representatives, party spokesman, Christophe Castaner announced his candidacy on 25 October 2017 with the endorsement of President Macron, allowing him to run unopposed. The congress took place on the 19 November 2017 and Castaner was elected the Executive Officer and leader of the party by a council of 800 people, with a quarter being members of the party. Castaner was elected for a term of three years. The congress generated media attention for criticism surrounding it, including a walk-out by attendees of the congress where a hundred attendees resigned from the party citing a lack of internal democracy and corruption.

The first by-election of the 15th National Assembly of France in Val-d'Oise's 1st constituency, which was a La République En Marche! seat, was called after it was ruled that deputy Isabelle Muller-Quoy's replacement Michel Alexeef was ineligible under the electoral code. Muller-Quoy, who had won the first round by 18 percentage points in 2017, won the first round of the by-election by only 5 percentage points, and went on to lose the seat to the LR candidate Antoine Savignat. The race was the first loss the party had endured in the National Assembly. Several subsequent by-elections showed a 10% overall swing against La République En Marche! since the June 2017 legislative elections.

=== 2019 European Parliament election ===
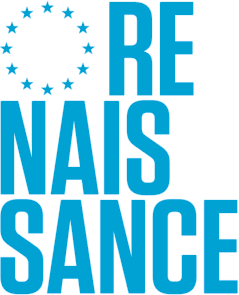
Logo of the Renaissance list of LREM, MoDem and other liberal parties

Ahead of the 2019 European Parliament election, La République En Marche! was widely expected to formalise a cooperation agreement with the Alliance of Liberals and Democrats for Europe (ALDE), the main liberal-centrist group in the European Parliament. However, amid the domestic upheaval caused by the Gilets Jaunes protests and the broader rise of nationalist and populist forces across Europe, President Emmanuel Macron recalibrated his strategy. Rather than aligning LREM directly with the existing ALDE brand, Macron chose to lead a more autonomous, pro-European campaign under the banner of Renaissance, framing it as a call for continental political renewal.

Following the election—during which the Renaissance list secured a strong second-place finish in France—LREM and its allies played a central role in the reorganisation of the ALDE parliamentary group. This process culminated in the launch of a new centrist and liberal alliance: Renew Europe, officially formed in June 2019. The group brought together Macron's Renaissance list, ALDE-affiliated parties, and other like-minded liberal and pro-European movements from across the European Union, making Renew Europe the third-largest political group in the European Parliament.

=== 2020 municipal elections ===
For the 2020 French municipal elections, La République En Marche! (LREM) set itself the ambitious objective of electing around 10,000 municipal councillors nationwide. Following the first round, party officials reported having already secured approximately 6,000 seats, mainly in small towns and rural communes. The party invested 592 lead candidates (têtes de liste) in municipalities with more than 9,000 inhabitants, of whom 289 were official LREM members.

Between the two rounds, LREM pursued a strategy of forging local alliances—76 with right-leaning lists and 33 with left-leaning ones—in towns over 9,000 residents. In several large cities, such as Bordeaux, Strasbourg, and Tours, the party aligned with centre-right incumbents to counter rising ecological or left-wing lists. According to party leadership, this skew toward the right was largely due to the political landscape inherited from the 2014 municipal elections, where the right had made significant gains. Marie Guévenoux, co-president of LREM's national investiture commission, justified the imbalance by saying that the party would have "preferred to forge alliances with the left," but left-wing groups generally declined to cooperate.

Despite the party's confident outlook following previous successes in the 2017 legislative and 2019 European elections, LREM ultimately failed to win any major city. It claimed 146 mayors invested or supported in municipalities with more than 9,000 inhabitants, and only three municipalities over 30,000 residents—all of which were victories by right-wing incumbents supported (but not officially labeled) by LREM.

In key symbolic cities such as Paris and Lyon, where the party had invested heavily, its candidates suffered heavy defeats, often finishing in third or fourth place. In Bordeaux, an alliance with the outgoing right-wing mayor failed to block a surge by the ecologists. Across the country, a "green wave" led by EELV swept through major urban centres, including Lyon, Strasbourg, and Bordeaux, dashing LREM's hopes of a metropolitan breakthrough.

The campaign also reflected deeper political tensions facing LREM. In many constituencies, candidates avoided displaying the party's logo due to widespread public dissatisfaction stemming from the Yellow vests movement, ongoing pension reform protests, youth-led climate strikes, and criticism over the government's handling of the COVID-19 pandemic.

=== 2022 legislative election ===
Logo of La République En Marche ! until the rebranding in 2022

In May 2022, following Emmanuel Macron's re-election as President of France, La République En Marche! announced a major rebranding effort as part of preparations for the legislative elections. The party declared that its parliamentary group would adopt the name Renaissance, a term intended to symbolise political renewal and the continuation of Macron's reformist agenda. This move coincided with the creation of a broader electoral confederation uniting Macron-aligned forces, including François Bayrou's MoDem and Édouard Philippe's Horizons.

In September 2022, LREM formally changed its name to Renaissance, establishing it as the new identity of the party itself and not just the parliamentary group. The name change was part of an effort to consolidate the presidential majority into a single political force, in line with Macron's long-standing goal of transcending the traditional left-right divide ("dépassement"). However, this ambition met with limited success. While two smaller Macron-aligned parties—Agir and Territories of Progress—formally merged into Renaissance, key allies such as MoDem and Horizons opted to retain their independence within the wider Ensemble coalition.

=== 2024 legislative election ===
Following a poor result in the European Parliament elections, Macron announced the dissolution of the National Assembly on 9 June 2024, triggering snap elections scheduled for 30 June and 7 July 2024. Renaissance led the centrist coalition known as Ensemble pour la République, which included MoDem, Horizons, UDI, and the Radical Party. However, internal tensions quickly arose, particularly with Édouard Philippe's Horizons party, which refused to fully campaign under the Renaissance banner and demanded more autonomy, leading to separate candidate declarations in several constituencies.

Renaissance invested more than 200 candidates, including several ministers (such as Gabriel Attal, Gérald Darmanin), former ministers (Élisabeth Borne, Olivier Véran), and new faces like Stéphane Séjourné and Loïc Signor. In the first round on 30 June, the Ensemble coalition obtained only around 21% of the vote, trailing both the Rassemblement National (33.1%) and the left-wing Nouveau Front Populaire (28%). Only four Ensemble candidates were elected outright, and Renaissance was leading in just 70 constituencies before the run-off.

In the second round, held on 7 July 2024, no single bloc obtained a majority. The left-wing Nouveau Front Populaire became the largest force with approximately 182 seats, followed by Ensemble with around 163 seats, and the Rassemblement National with about 143. Renaissance alone dropped from 245 seats in 2022 to about 160–162, according to projections. The outcome prompted a political crisis within the centrist bloc. Prime Minister Gabriel Attal convened an emergency meeting to coordinate second-round endorsements and later was elected president of the Renaissance group in the National Assembly on 13 July.

Following the election, discussions intensified over a possible alliance between Renaissance and the centre-right Republicans (LR) to form a working majority, though such a coalition would still fall short of the 289 seats required for an absolute majority.

== Ideology ==
Although Macron was a member of the PS from 2006 to 2009 and an independent politician from 2009 to 2016, La République En Marche! seeks to transcend traditional political boundaries to be a transpartisan organisation.

Various sources have described the party as being centrist, centre-right, or big tent. Historically, back in 2019, the party was also labelled by some sources as centre-left. Macron described the party in 2016 as being a progressive party of both the left and the right. In 2017, observers and political commentators have described the party as being culturally liberal, as well as socially liberal and economically liberal in ideology. The party has also been described as using anti-establishment, populist strategies and rhetoric, with discourse comparable to the Third Way as adopted by the Labour Party in the UK during its New Labour phase. The party has been described as supporting some policies close to centre-right classical liberalism.

According to an Ipsos survey conducted in March 2018, some public perception of the party has moved to the right since March 2017, with 45% of respondents classifying the party as being centre-right (25%) to right-wing (20%). 21% of respondents place it in the centre, compared to 33% in March 2017.

== Associate parties ==
Name	Ideology	Position	Leader	Current MPs
Democrats and Progressives	Social liberalism, Social democracy	Centre to centre-left	Xavier Iacovelli	9 / 577
Agir	Conservative liberalism, Pro-Europeanism	Centre-right	Franck Riester	4 / 577
Ecologist Party	Green politics, Green liberalism	Centre-left	François de Rugy	0 / 577
Guiana Rally	Liberalism, Autonomism	Centre	Rodolphe Alexandre	0 / 577
United Guadeloupe, Solidary and Responsible	Social liberalism, Autonomism	Centre	Guy Losbar	0 / 577

== Organisation ==
=== Symbols ===
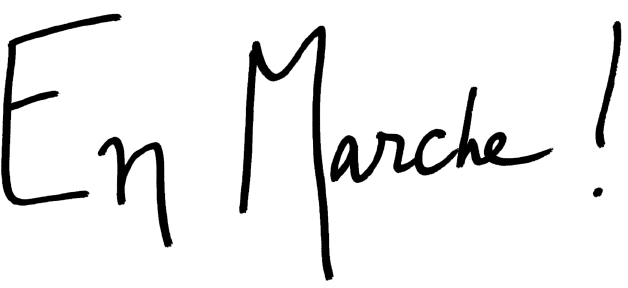
First logo, submitted to the INPI on 8 April 2016

Second logo, submitted to the INPI on 9 February 2017

Third logo, submitted to the INPI on 7 May 2017

Alternative logo, 2022

=== Membership ===
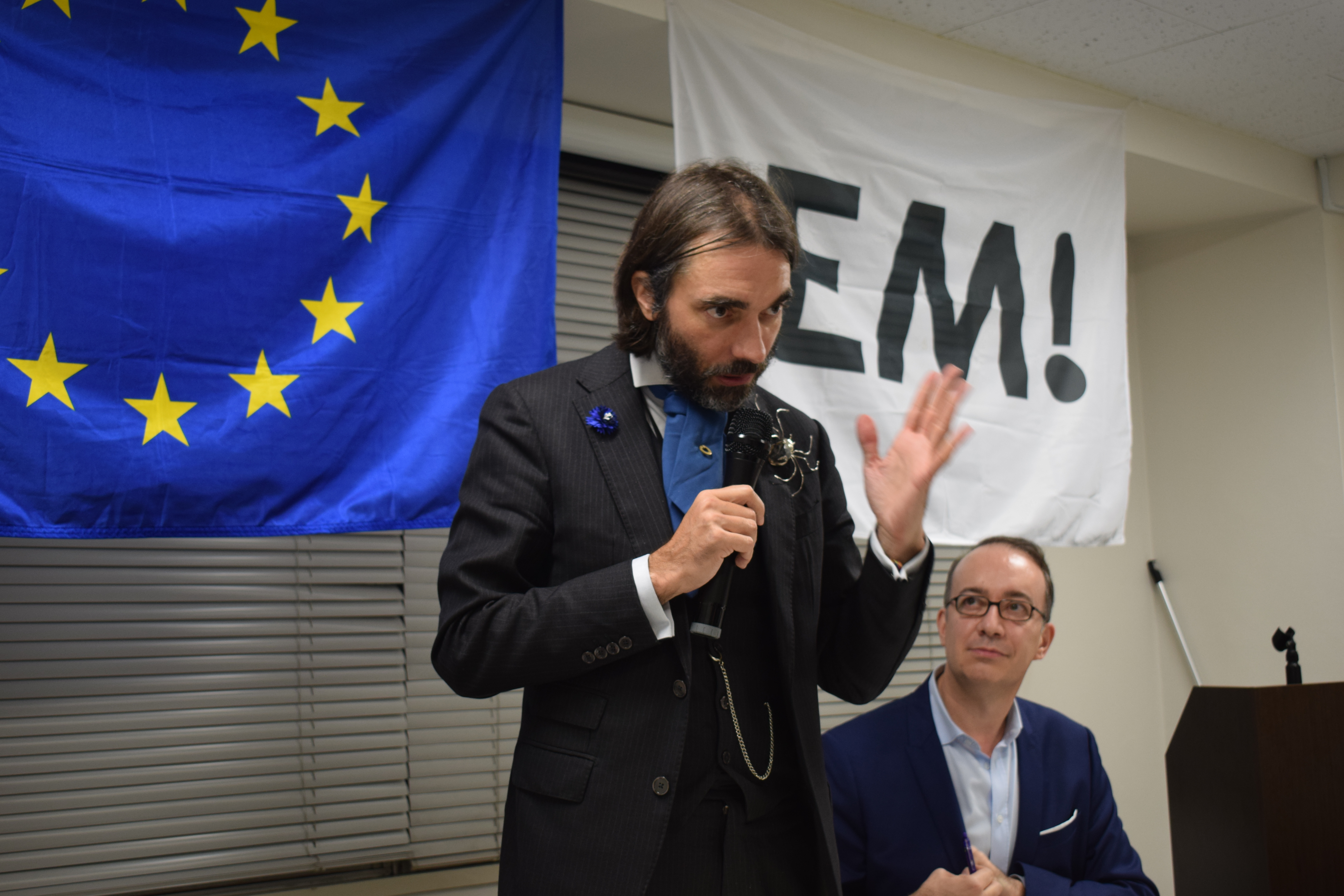
Cédric Villani at a public meeting of La République En Marche in Tokyo

La République En Marche! considers every person who submits identification information (date of birth, email, full address and telephone number) and adheres to the party's charter to be a member. Unlike other political parties, it does not require members to make a monetary donation. Macron has indicated that it is possible to join La République En Marche! while remaining a member of another republican party.

On 10 April 2016, a few days after the movement's launch, Macron claimed 13,000 members. Le Canard enchaîné accused him of inflating the figure and claimed that 13,000 was in reality the number of clicks that Macron had received on his website. Ismaël Emelien, Macron's advisor, clarified that "each member signs a charter of values and has a voice in the movement's general assembly" and "that has nothing to do with those who sign up for the newsletter, who are much greater in number". Sylvain Fort, another of Macron's advisors, affirmed that the movement verifies the email addresses of members but conceded that "the system relies on the honesty of each member".

In October 2016, Macron affirmed that En Marche! was "neck and neck with the Socialist Party" in terms of membership after only seven months of existence. According to Mediapart, this included many independents and executives, but few functionaries, farmers and unemployed people. Many of its members had never been engaged in politics. However, the majority had only shown interest by leaving their information on the party website.

La République En Marche! takes inspiration from the participatory model of Désirs d'avenir, Ségolène Royal's movement and intends to rely on its member files, according to deputy Pascal Terrasse and former leader of Désirs d'avenir. According to Libération, the movement relies on a pyramidal enrolment system inspired by Barack Obama's campaigns of 2008 and 2012.

By relying on a participatory political model, each La République En Marche! adherent has the opportunity to freely join or create a local committee. Each of these committees is led by one or more adherents who organize the committee by planning local events, meetings and debates centered around the ideas and values promoted by the movement. La République En Marche! counted more than 2,600 of these committees in December 2016.

=== Finance ===
Christian Dargnat, former general director of BNP Paribas Asset Management, leads the La République En Marche! financial association. Since its creation, the association has raised funds for the party. In 2016, Georges Fenech, a deputy of the Republicans, alerted the National Assembly that the association had continued fund raising even during Macron's trip to London. This led Prime Minister Manuel Valls to issue an official denial even though En Marche! had already done so. Macron declared in May 2016 that 2,000 donors had already contributed financially to the party. In December 2016, he spoke of more than 10,000 donors from 1 euro to 7,500 euros. By the end of December 2016, he had collected between 4 and 5 million euros in donations. At the end of March, this figure exceeded 9 million euros from 35,000 donations, averaging 257 euros per donation. 600 donors made up half of the total amount donated, with donations upwards of 5,000 euros.

In the book Dans l'enfer de Bercy: Enquête sur les secrets du ministère des Finances (JC Lattès, 2017) by journalists Frédéric Says and Marion L'Hour, Macron was accused of using 120,000 euros from the state budget from 1 January to 30 August 2016 in order to fund his presidential campaign.

=== European representation ===
In the European Parliament, La République En Marche sits in the Renew Europe group with five MEPs.

In the European Committee of the Regions, La République En Marche sits in the Renew Europe CoR group, with two full members for the 2025–2030 mandate. Anne Rudisuhli is Coordinator in the SEDEC Commission and Magali Altounian is the Chair of the CIVEX Commission and member of the Bureau of the Renew Europe CoR Group.

== Election results ==
=== Presidential elections ===
Presidency of the French Republic
Election year	Candidate	First round			Second round			Result
Election year	Candidate	Votes	%	Rank	Votes	%	Rank	Result
2017	Emmanuel Macron	8,656,346	24.01	▲1st	20,743,128	66.10	▲1st	Won
2022	Emmanuel Macron	9,783,058	27.85	1st	18,768,639	58.55	1st	Won

=== Legislative elections ===
National Assembly
Election year	Leader	First round		Second round		Seats	+/−	Rank (seats)	Government
Election year	Leader	Votes	%	Votes	%	Seats	+/−	Rank (seats)	Government
2017	Richard Ferrand	6,391,269	28.21	7,826,245	43.06	308 / 577	▲308	1st	Presidential majority (2017−2020)
2017	Richard Ferrand	6,391,269	28.21	7,826,245	43.06	308 / 577	▲308	1st	Presidential majority (2020−2022)
2017	Richard Ferrand	6,391,269	28.21	7,826,245	43.06	308 / 577	▲308	1st	Presidential majority (2022)
2022	Élisabeth Borne	5,857,364	25.71	8,003,240	38.57	133 / 577	▼175	1st	Presidential minority (2022−2024)
2024	Gabriel Attal	6,820,446	21.28	6,691,619	24.53	98 / 577	▼35	2nd	
2024	Gabriel Attal	6,820,446	21.28	6,691,619	24.53	98 / 577	▼35	2nd	Presidential minority (2024)
2024	Gabriel Attal	6,820,446	21.28	6,691,619	24.53	98 / 577	▼35	2nd	Presidential minority (2024−2025)
2024	Gabriel Attal	6,820,446	21.28	6,691,619	24.53	98 / 577	▼35	2nd	Presidential minority (2025−present)

=== European Parliament ===
European Parliament
Election	Leader	Votes	%	Seats	+/−	EP Group
2019 (Note: Run as part of Ensemble, which won 23 seats in total.)	Nathalie Loiseau	5,079,015	22.42 (#2)	12 / 79	New	RE
2024 (Note: Run as part of Ensemble, which won 13 seats in total.)	Valérie Hayer	3,589,114	14.56 (#2)	4 / 81	▼8	RE

== See also ==
- La République En Marche group (Senate)
- Liberalism and radicalism in France
- List of political parties in France
- Renaissance group
