= Alberto Giacometti à la Galerie Maeght, Paris, France, 1961 =

Photograph by Henri Cartier-Bresson

Alberto Giacometti à la Galerie Maeght, Paris, France, 1961 (1961) by Henri Cartier-Bresson

Alberto Giacometti à la Galerie Maeght, Paris, France, 1961, or, in English, Alberto Giacometti at the Galerie Maeght, Paris, France, 1961, is a black and white photograph by French photographer Henri Cartier-Bresson, taken in 1961. The picture depicts his old friend of two decades, the Swiss sculptor Alberto Giacometti, as he appears to be setting up his own exhibition at the Galerie Maeght, in Paris.

== History and description ==
Cartier-Bresson had a longtime friendship with Giacometti and the two shared many of the same interests and beliefs about artistic creation. The French photographer said about him: "I was overjoyed to learn that Alberto had the same three passions that I have: Cézanne, Van Eyck, and Uccello. He has said things that are so right about photography and the attitude one needs to have...”

This photograph is one of the most famous that Cartier-Bresson did of Giacometti. The Swiss sculptor appears blurred, walking in the set of one of his exhibitions, curved and smoking a cigarette, while carrying one of his sculptures on his hands. At the right, there is one of his high and white slender standing sculptures, while at the left, one of his walking sculptures of men, dark and slender, seems to be mirroring his own walk. Paintings and other of his sculptures, of smaller size, lie in the ground.

An article of the Huxley-Parlour Gallery states: "Much as Giacometti’s sculpture capitalises on the disjunct between movement and stillness, here, Cartier-Bresson’s photograph plays with temporality. Giacometti’s figure is perfectly mirrored by the sculpture to his left that steps into the frame of the picture with equal purpose to the artist. The blank wall behind him features paintings leaning expectantly. The scene before the camera is therefore one of liminality: finished art works in an unfinished interior."

== Public collections ==
There are prints of this photograph at the Henri Cartier-Bresson Foundation, in Paris, the Musée National d'Art Moderne, in Paris, and the Victoria and Albert Museum, in London.
