= Natcho Aguirre, Santa Clara, Mexico =

Photograph by Henri Cartier-Bresson

Natcho Aguirre, Santa Clara, Mexico (1934)

Natcho Aguirre, Santa Clara, Mexico, is a black and white photograph taken by Henri Cartier-Bresson in 1934, while in a travel to Mexico.

== History and description ==
The picture appears staged, but its context and significance are left unexplained. It depicts to the left a man, with his face cut out and only partially visible, exposing his bare chest covered by his crossed arms, with his hands held up in fists, while his pants are partially unzipped. The man seems to be contorting in either agony or ecstasy, in a somewhat Christ-like pose, like if he were protecting or piercing his breasts. Its visible at his right a shelving cabinet with two groups of shoes.

The enigmatic and erotic composition, with the juxtaposition of apparently unrelated elements demonstrates the influence of Surrealism and the notion of "convulsive beauty", exposed by André Breton, in the artist work, like also Cartier-Bresson's love of geometric forms.

== Public collections ==
There are prints of this photograph in several public collections, including the Henri Cartier-Bresson Foundation, in Paris, the Metropolitan Museum of Art, in New York, and the National Gallery of Australia, in Canberra.
