= Behind the Gare Saint-Lazare =

Photograph by Henri Cartier-Bresson

Behind the Gare Saint-Lazare (1932)

Behind the Gare Saint-Lazare is a black and white photograph taken by French photographer Henri Cartier-Bresson in Paris in 1932. The photograph has been printed at variable dimensions; the print donated by Cartier-Bresson to the Museum of Modern Art is listed at 35.2 × 24.1 cm. It is one of his best known and more critically acclaimed photographs and became iconic of his style that attempted to capture the decisive moment in photography. The photograph was considered by Time magazine to be one of the 100 most influential of all time.

== History and description ==
The spontaneous photograph was taken by Cartier-Bresson at the Place de l'Europe, outside the Saint-Lazare train station, in Paris, with his portable Leica camera. In this case, he took aim at a man who leaps above a shallow flooded space, without touching it, while his image is reflected beneath him, near a partially submerged ladder. Behind him posters in a wall advertise the pianist Alexander Brailowsky and dancers - that seem to echo the man's movement - although Cartier-Bresson stated that he had not noticed the posters until afterwards. The man is forever framed in the air, without touching the water, capturing the moment before he inevitably lands in the pool. This was one of the few photographs that the artist cropped. Cartier-Bresson explained that "There was a plank fence around some repairs behind the Gare [Saint] Lazare, and I was peeking through the spaces with my camera eye. This is what I saw. The space between the planks was not entirely wide enough for my lens, which is the reason the picture is cut off on the left.” The uncropped photograph shows the heavy dark shadow with a blurred edge on the left but also displays an uninspiring space below the pool which has also been removed.

It was exhibited as soon as 1933 at the Julien Levy gallery in New York under the name "homme sautant place de l'Europe".

== Art market ==
A print of the photograph sold at Christie's on November 17, 2011 for $590,455, then the highest price for a work by the artist.

== Public collections ==
There are prints of this photograph at several public collections, including the Henri Cartier-Bresson Foundation in Paris, the Musée National d'Art Moderne in Paris, at the Centre Pompidou in Paris, the Museum of Modern Art in New York, the International Center of Photography in New York, the Minneapolis Institute of Art, LACMA the Los Angeles County Museum of Art, and the San Francisco Museum of Modern Art.

== Derivative works ==
- Isabelle Le Minh, Trop tôt, trop tard (After Henri Cartier-Bresson) (2007)
- Charles Woodard, The History of Photography in Pen & Ink (2012)
- Mike Stimpson, Behind the Gare Saint-Lazare, after Henri Cartier-Bresson (2013)
- Irina Popova, Iconic Drawings (2015)
- Cortis & Sonderegger, The decisive moment, making of Derrière la Gare Saint-Lazare (2016)
- Vincent Morla, Parodie de Derrière la Gare Saint-Lazare (2020)

== See also ==
- List of photographs considered the most important
