= Gold Rush, Shanghai =

Photograph by Henri Cartier-Bresson

Gold Rush, Shanghai (1948)

Gold Rush, Shanghai, also known by other titles like Gold Rush. The Last Days of Kuomintang, Shanghai, is a black and white photograph taken by Henri Cartier-Bresson in 1948.

== History and description ==
Cartier-Bresson went to China in December 1948, initially on a short assignment for Life magazine, but then staying on for far longer, documenting the historical events and the general environment as the Kuomintang government fell while the Chinese Communist Party was about to seize power and to proclaim what would become the People's Republic of China, in 1949.

This is one of the most famous photographs from the large number shot by Cartier-Bresson during this period. It was taken in Shanghai, on 23 December 1948, recording what happened when the currency crashed and the Kuomintang decided to distribute 14 grams of gold per person. Thousands of people then queued to exchange this gold for cash, with many crushed to death as a result.

The picture, entirely spontaneous despite what might seem like a choreographed composition, shows one of these instances; a crowd of desperate customers, men and women, pressed together in their panic to reach the bank and sell their gold. Cartier-Bresson carefully waited for the drama of the scene to fall in place, only then capturing it for posterity.

== Public collections ==
There are prints of this photograph at the Henri Cartier-Bresson Foundation, in Paris, the Museum Ludwig, in Cologne, and at the Metropolitan Museum of Art, in New York.
