= Louis Franck (ice hockey) =

Belgian ice hockey player and sailor

Personal information
- Born: 28 December 1907 Antwerp, Belgium
- Died: 5 September 1988 (aged 80) Bern, Switzerland

Sport
- Sport: Ice hockey, sailing
- Team: CPA, Antwerpen
Medal record
Representing Belgium
Ice Hockey European Championships
Silver medal – second place	1927 Vienna	Team

Louis Franck (28 December 1907 – 5 September 1988) was a Belgian ice hockey player and sailor. He won a silver medal at the Ice Hockey European Championships in 1927.

He also represented Belgium with Sailing at the 1948 Summer Olympics.

He was son of Pierre François Jean Franck and nephew of the Belgian politician Louis Franck. He became director and major shareholder at merchant bank Samuel Montagu & Co. in London and was art collector. His daughter Martine Franck married photographer Henri Cartier-Bresson.
