= Treasure of Rue Mouffetard =

Collection of gold coins found in Paris in 1983

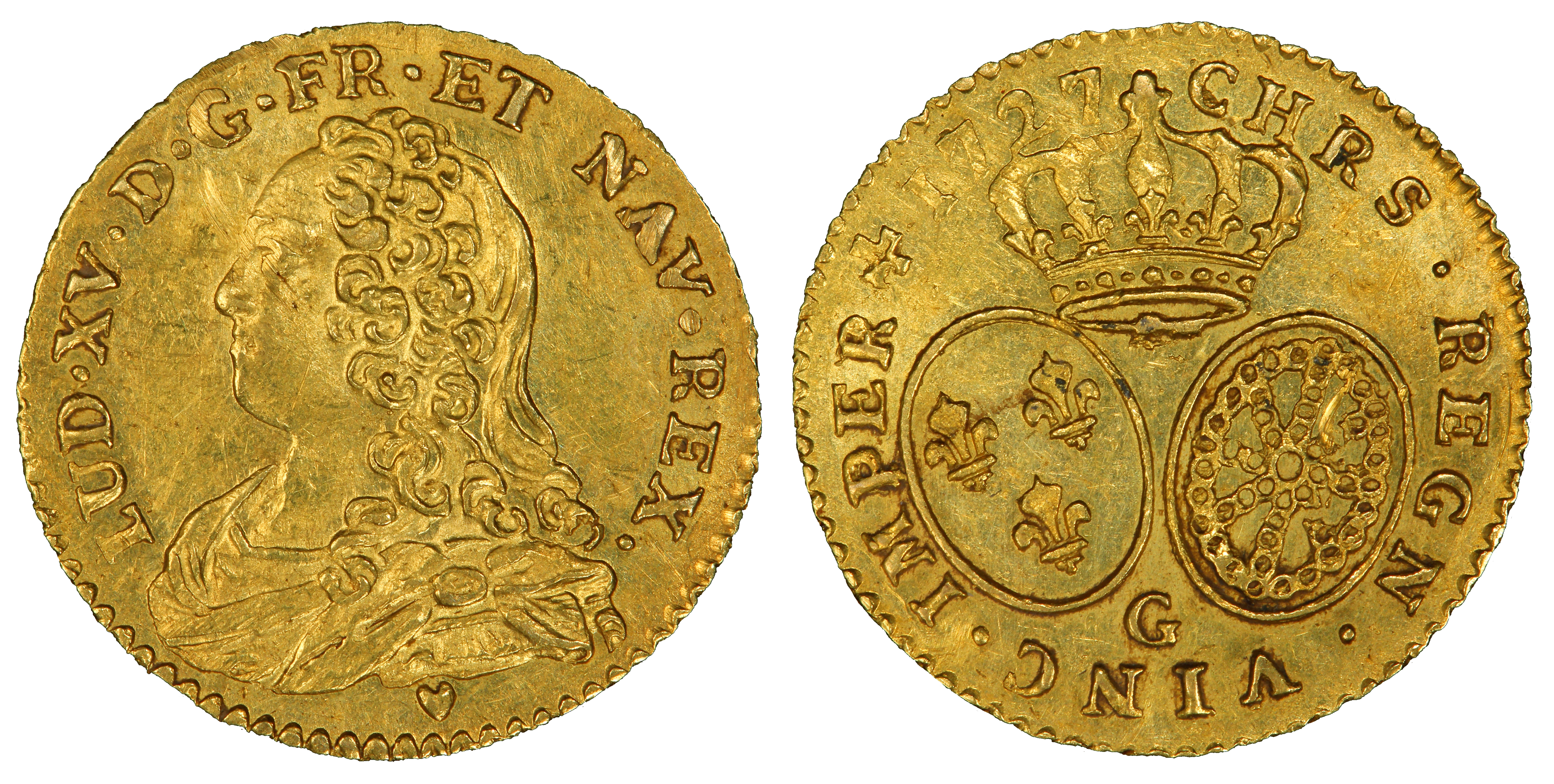
Louis XV coin from 1727.

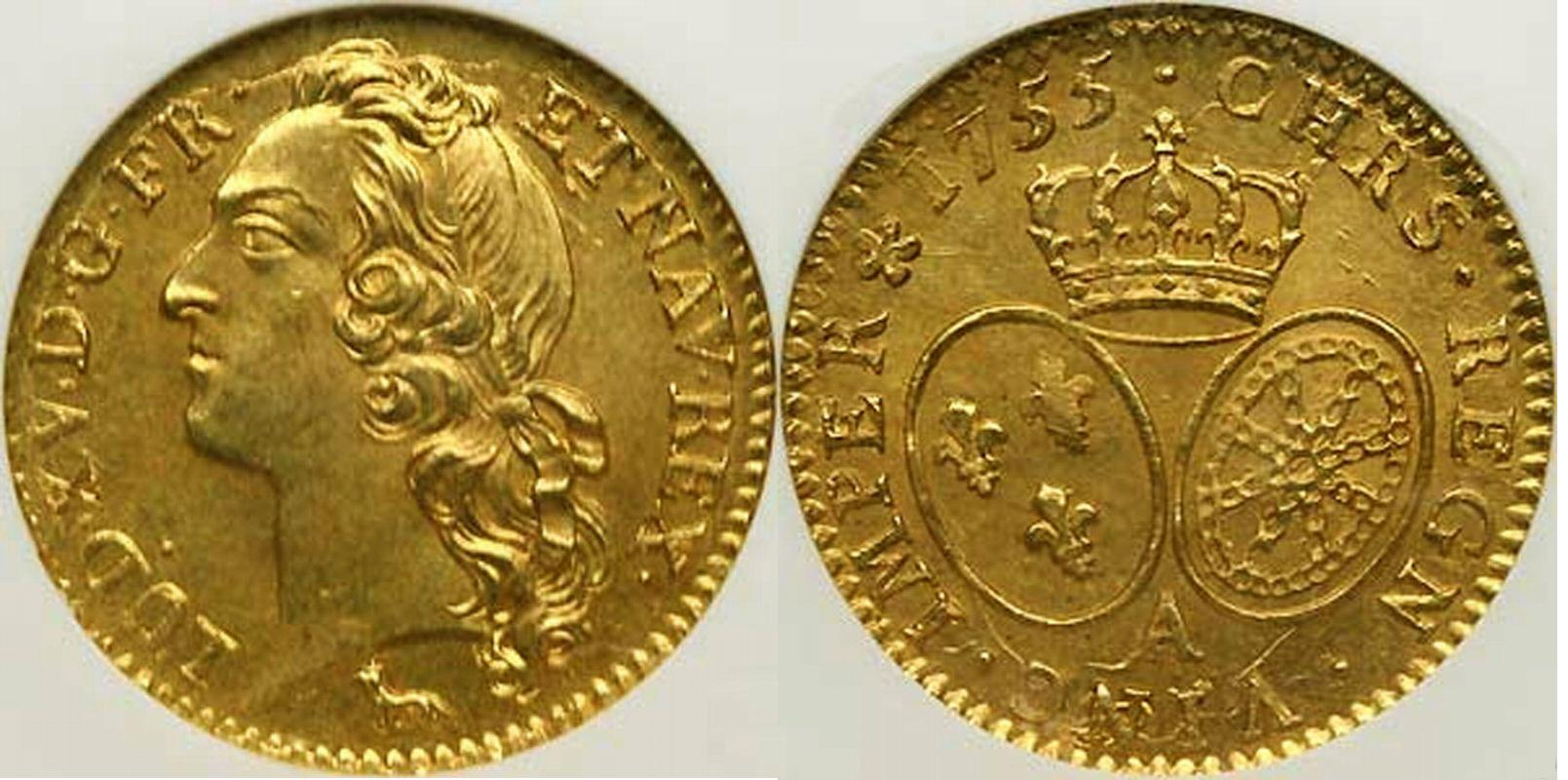
Louis XV coin from 1755.

The Treasure of Rue Mouffetard (French: Le Trésor de la rue Mouffetard) is a collection of 3210 gold coins discovered by chance in 1938 in Rue Mouffetard, Paris. The coins date to the reign of Louis XV.

On May 24, 1938, workers were demolishing buildings at 51 and 53, Rue Mouffetard in Paris when they noticed a hiding place in a wall at the building at No. 53. The workers then found several rolls of coins wrapped in pieces of canvas. At first, a worker who had taken some of the coins believed them to be worthless copper coins, and gave them to his son to play marbles. But a passer-by realized their value and informed the worker.

Further inspection found a will written by Louis Nivelle, "Counselor, Secretary of the King" leaving the coins to his daughter Anne-Louise-Claude Nivelle. It transpired that Louis Nivelle had died of a sudden heart attack before telling his daughter about the coins.

On June 7, 1949, the discovery was eventually declared legal, based on French laws regarding the discovery of treasures. The proceeds were to be shared by three groups. One part went to the workers, one part to the city of Paris, and the rest to the current owner of the building and the 82 attested heirs of Anne Nivelle. The coins were sold over time, and the sales lasted until 1960.

== Sources ==
- Sabine Bourgey, Le Trésor de la rue Mouffetard, éditions Bourgey, 2010.
- Sabine Bourgey, Trésors, archives secrètes, édition Errances, Paris, 1998. Le trésor de la rue Mouffetard, pages 49 – 67.
- Sabine Bourgey, Trésors, légendes et réalités, éditions de L’Amateur, 1996. ISBN 978-2859172046
