= Sonderegger =

Sonderegger is a surname. Notable people with the name include:

- Emil Sonderegger (1868–1934), Swiss military officer
- Frauke Sonderegger, Swiss orienteering competitor
- John L. Sonderegger (1914–1992), American businessman and politician
- Katherine Sonderegger, American Episcopal priest
- Urs Sonderegger (born 1964), Swiss entrepreneur and racing driver

== See also ==
- Cortis & Sonderegger, collaborative team of two Swiss artists, Jojakim Cortis and Adrian Sonderegger
- Sonderegger Pine
