= Ratna Mohini =

Indonesian dancer

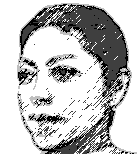
- Ratna Mohini
- Born: 17 May 1904
- Died: 24 October 1988 (aged 84)
- Spouse: Henri Cartier-Bresson (m. 1937; div. 1967)

Ratna "Elie" Mohini (17 May 1904 – 24 October 1988) was a Javanese dancer who was the wife of the French photographer Henri Cartier-Bresson from 1937 to 1967.

She was born in Batavia as Carolina Jeanne de Souza-IJke. Ratna was known as "Elie" to her friends. Between 1930 and 1935 she was married to the Dutch journalist Willem L. Berretty.

Cartier-Bresson and Mohini divorced in 1967, after 30 years of marriage, and Cartier-Bresson then married the photographer Martine Franck in 1970.

Mohini died in Paris in 1988.
