= Rue Mouffetard, Paris (photograph) =

Photograph by Henri Cartier-Bresson

Rue Mouffetard, Paris (1954), by Henri Cartier-Bresson

Rue Mouffetard, Paris is a black and white photograph taken by Henri Cartier-Bresson in a Paris street, Rue Mouffetard, in 1954.

== History and description ==
The picture is one of the best known of the artist and is named after the street where the event was caught on camera. It was taken candidly in the Rue Mouffetard, in Paris, and it exemplifies what he described as the decisive moment. The picture is also one of the best examples of the genre of street photography, which was cultivated by the author. The atmosphere of the photograph is very light-hearted. It depicts a young smiling child, named Michel Gabriel, walking while carrying two bottles of wine on his arms. Behind him, at the left, the blurred image shows two girls that watch him amused. Two adult women, also blurred, are seen at the bottom left, of those only one is looking at the scene.

== Public collections ==
There are prints of this photograph at the Henri Cartier-Bresson Foundation, in Paris, the Museum of Fine Arts, in Houston, and at the Museum of Modern Art, in New York.
