= Place Georges-Moustaki =

Square in Paris, France

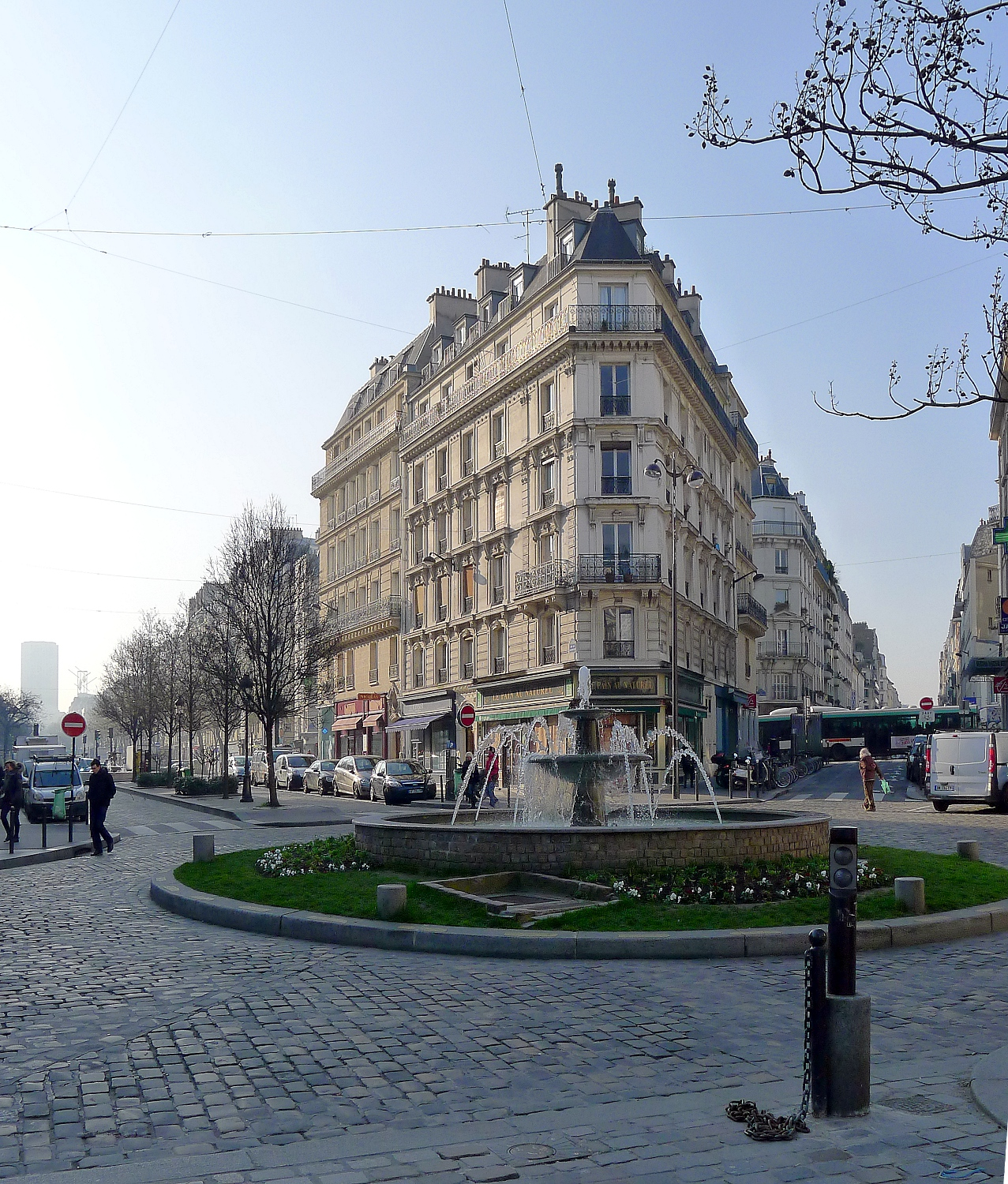
Place Georges-Moustaki

The Place Georges-Moustaki is a public square in the 5th arrondissement of Paris.

== History ==
The roundabout is at the intersection of the Rue Censier, Rue Mouffetard, Rue de Bazeilles, and Rue Pascal.

On May 23, 2017, the Place Georges-Moustaki was officially inaugurated in honor of the singer Georges Moustaki. Present at the inauguration were his daughter, as well as Anne Hidalgo, the Mayor of Paris, and Florence Berthout, the Mayor of the 5th arrondissement.
