= Quartier du Jardin-des-Plantes =

Coordinates: 48.844036°N 2.3597321°E

Jardin-des-Plantes
- Quartier du Jardin-des-Plantes
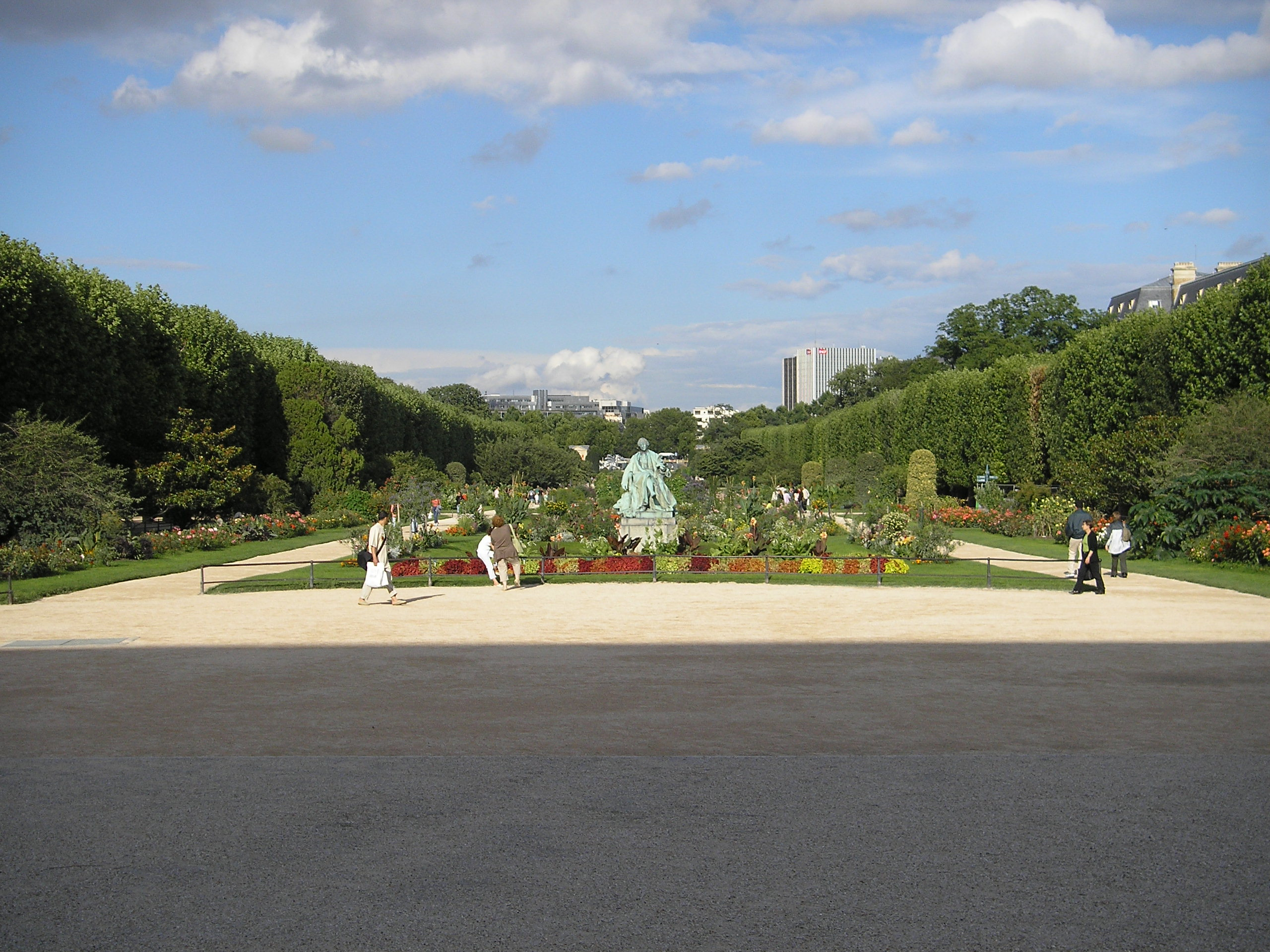
- Jardin des Plantes
- Interactive map of Jardin-des-Plantes
- Country: France
- Region: Île-de-France
- Ville: Paris
- Arrondissement: 5th

Area
  - Total: 0.798 km^{2} (0.308 sq mi)

Population (2016)
  - Total: 22,414
  - Density: 17,886/km^{2} (46,320/sq mi)

The Quartier du Jardin-des-Plantes is the 18th administrative district of Paris, located in the 5th arrondissement, south and west of the Jardin des Plantes.

Several streets in this district (and in the neighboring Quartier Saint-Victor) bear the names of naturalists from the Jardin du Roi, which became the National Museum of Natural History: Buffon, Cuvier, Daubenton, Geoffroy Saint-Hilaire, Guy de La Brosse, Jussieu, Lacépède…

== Boundaries ==
The Jardin-des-Plantes district is bordered (clockwise):

- to the east by Boulevard de l'Hôpital;
- to the south by Boulevard Saint-Marcel and a small section of Boulevard de Port-Royal;
- to the west by Rue Pascal and Rue Mouffetard;
- to the north by Rue Lacépède, Rue Cuvier, and the Seine River.

Its population was estimated at approximately 16,864 in 2024.

The quartiers of the 5th arrondissement.

== Specific sites ==
- The Jardin des Plantes and the National Museum of Natural History
- Saint-Médard Church
- The Censier campus
- The Grand Mosque of Paris
