= Martin Munkácsi =

Hungarian photographer (1896–1963)

- Born: Mermelstein Márton; 18 May 1896; Kolozsvár, Hungary (now Cluj-Napoca, Romania)
- Died: 13 July 1963 (aged 67); New York City, New York, U.S.

Martin Munkácsi (born Mermelstein Márton; 18 May 1896 – 13 July 1963) was a Hungarian photographer who worked in Germany (1928–1934) and the United States, where he was based in New York City.

== Life and works ==
Munkácsi was a newspaper writer and photographer in Hungary, specializing in sports. At the time, sports action photography could only be done in bright light outdoors. Munkácsi's innovation was to make sport photographs as meticulously composed action photographs, which required both artistic and technical skill.

Munkácsi's break was to happen upon a fatal brawl, which he photographed. Those photos affected the outcome of the trial of the accused killer, and gave Munkácsi considerable renown. That renown helped him get a job in Berlin in 1928, for Berliner Illustrirte Zeitung, where his first published photo was a motorcycle splashing its way through a puddle. He also worked for the fashion magazine Die Dame.

More than just sports and fashion, he photographed Berliners, rich and poor, in all their activities. He traveled to Turkey, Sicily, Egypt, London, New York and Liberia, for photo spreads in Berliner Illustrirte Zeitung.

The speed of the modern age and the excitement of new photographic viewpoints enthralled him, especially flying. There are aerial photographs; there are air-to-air photographs of a flying school for women; there are photographs from a Zeppelin, including the ones on his trip to Brazil, where he crossed over a boat whose passengers wave to the airship above.

On 21 March 1933, he photographed the fateful Day of Potsdam, when the aged President Paul von Hindenburg handed Germany over to Adolf Hitler. On assignment for Berliner Illustrirte Zeitung, he photographed Hitler's inner circle, although he was a Jewish foreigner.

Munkácsi left for New York City, where he signed on, for a substantial $100,000, with Harper's Bazaar, a fashion magazine. He was discovered by Carmel Snow, who in 1933 persuaded him to photograph the Harper's Bazaar December edition's 'Palm Beach' bathing suit issue. For this issue, he had the model Lucille Brokaw run toward the camera while he photographed her, which was the first instance of a fashion model being photographed in motion.

In a change from usual practice, he often left the studio to shoot outdoors, on the beach, on farms and fields, at an airport. He produced one of the first articles in a popular magazine to be illustrated with nude photographs.

In 1934, the Nazis nationalized Berliner Illustrirte Zeitung, fired its Jewish editor-in-chief, Kurt Korff, and replaced its innovative photography with pictures of German troops. He died on July 13, 1963.

Munkácsi's portraits include Katharine Hepburn, Leslie Howard, Jean Harlow, Joan Crawford, Jane Russell, Louis Armstrong, and the definitive dance photograph of Fred Astaire.

Munkácsi died in poverty and controversy after suffering a heart attack while attending a soccer game at Randall’s Island in New York City. Several universities and museums declined to accept his archives, and they were scattered around the world. Berlin's Ullstein Archives and Hamburg's F. C. Gundlach collection are home to two of the largest collections of Munkácsi's work.

Munkácsi's family (The Hilbert Family) remain in Hungary.

== Munkácsi's influence ==
In 1932, the young Henri Cartier-Bresson, at the time an undirected photographer who catalogued his travels and his friends, saw the Munkácsi photograph Three Boys at Lake Tanganyika, taken on a beach in Liberia (An edit added: Lake Tanganyika is not located in Liberia. It lies within the territories of DR Congo, Tanzania, Zambia, and Burundi.) Cartier-Bresson later said,

For me this photograph was the spark that ignited my enthusiasm. I suddenly realized that, by capturing the moment, photography was able to achieve eternity. It is the only photograph to have influenced me. This picture has such intensity, such joie de vivre, such a sense of wonder that it continues to fascinate me to this day.

He paraphrased this many times during his life, saying,

I suddenly understood that photography can fix eternity in a moment. It is the only photo that influenced me. There is such intensity in this image, such spontaneity, such joie de vivre, such miraculousness, that even today it still bowls me over.

Richard Avedon said of Munkácsi,

He brought a taste for happiness and honesty and a love of women to what was, before him, a joyless, loveless, lying art. Today the world of what is called fashion is peopled with Munkácsi's babies, his heirs. ... The art of Munkácsi lay in what he wanted life to be, and he wanted it to be splendid. And it was.

W. Eugene Smith credited Munkácsi,

For the first time I realized how tremendously deep, rhythmic, and powerful photography could be. It was this simple revelation by Munkacsi-- that photography offered a great deal more than I had seen-- that affected me greatly. [Vicki Goldberg (ed.) 1981 p.433]

In 2005, the House of Photography in the Deichtorhallen Hamburg mounted the retrospective exhibition Martin Munkácsi: Think While You Shoot!, which was then presented at the International Center of Photography in 2007, in conjunction with the show Henri Cartier-Bresson's Scrapbook: Photographs, 1932-46. In 2009, the Howard Greenberg Gallery in New York City staged a joint exhibit of photographs by Edward Steichen and Munkácsi.

In 2021, the Jewish Museum in New York City included several of Munkácsi's photographs in an exhibit titled "Modern Look: Photography and the American Magazine," exploring how photography, graphic design, and popular magazines converged to transform American visual culture from 1930 to 1960.
