= With the Abraham Lincoln Brigade in Spain =

1938 documentary film

- Directed by: Henri Cartier-Bresson; Herbert Kline
- Release date: 1938
- Running time: 18 minutes
- Language: English

With the Abraham Lincoln Brigade in Spain (French: Avec la brigade Abraham Lincoln en Espagne) is a 1938 silent war documentary film directed by Henri Cartier-Bresson and Herbert Kline. Filmed in black and white, it documents the Lincoln Brigade in the Spanish Civil War, combining footage shot by Cartier-Bresson and Kline with newsreel material by Robert Capa and additional footage by Jacques Lemare. Initially shot in 35mm, a 16mm version of the film was produced to be shown in union halls and clubs. The purpose of the documentary was to raise money to help wounded International Brigades volunteers return home.

The film was considered lost until it was discovered by curator Juan Salas in the office of the Veterans of the Lincoln Brigade in 2010.

With the Abraham Lincoln Brigade in Spain was selected for preservation in the U.S. National Film Registry of the Library of Congress in 2017, for being "culturally, historically, or aesthetically significant".
