= Three Boys at Lake Tanganyika =

1930 photograph by Martin Munkácsi

Three Boys at Lake Tanganyika, ca. 1930

Three Boys at Lake Tanganyika is a photograph taken by Martin Munkácsi in 1929 or 1930.

While Munkácsi is known for his fashion photography, he established his reputation with his news photography that was mostly published in German weeklies. This photograph inspired Henri Cartier-Bresson, the father of modern photojournalism, who said about it, "I suddenly understood that photography can fix eternity in a moment."

It shows three naked young African boys, caught in near-silhouette, running into the surf of Lake Tanganyika. It captured the freedom, grace and spontaneity of their movement and their joy at being alive.
