= Montjustin =

- Commune
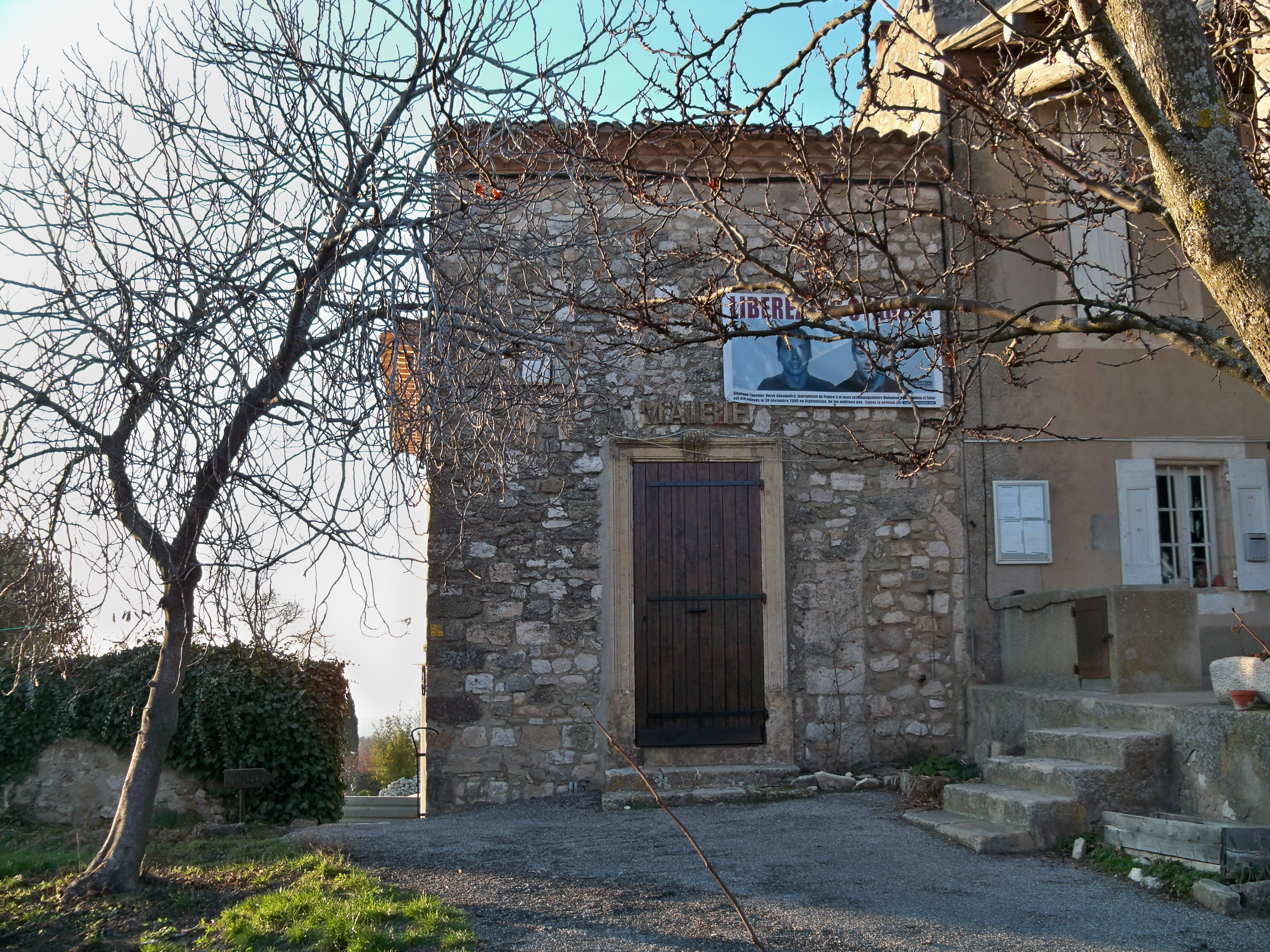
- Town hall

- Coat of arms
- Location of Montjustin
- Location within France Location within Provence-Alpes-Côte d'Azur
- Coordinates: 43°51′00″N 5°38′08″E
- Country: France
- Region: Provence-Alpes-Côte d'Azur
- Department: Alpes-de-Haute-Provence
- Arrondissement: Forcalquier
- Canton: Reillanne
- Intercommunality: Haute-Provence-Pays de Banon

Government
  - Mayor (2026–32): Justin de Gonzague
- Area^{1}: 10.15 km^{2} (3.92 sq mi)
- Elevation: 550 m (1,800 ft)
- Highest elevation: 721 m (2,365 ft)
- Lowest elevation: 386 m (1,266 ft)
- Population (2023): 54
  - Density: 5.3/km^{2} (14/sq mi)
- Time zone: UTC+01:00 (CET)
  - Summer (DST): UTC+02:00 (CEST)
- INSEE/Postal code: 04129 /04110
- ^{1} French Land Register data, which excludes lakes, ponds, glaciers > 1 km^{2} (0.386 sq mi or 247 acres) and river estuaries.

Montjustin (French pronunciation: [mɔ̃ʒystɛ̃]) is a commune in the Alpes-de-Haute-Provence department in southeastern France.

== Population ==
Historical population
Year	Pop.	±% p.a.
1968	46	—
1975	45	−0.31%
1982	47	+0.62%
1990	54	+1.75%
1999	60	+1.18%
2007	51	−2.01%
2012	53	+0.77%
2017	58	+1.82%
2023	54	−1.18%
Source: INSEE

== Personalities ==
- Henri Cartier-Bresson was buried in the cemetery of Montjustin.

== See also ==
- Luberon
- Communes of the Alpes-de-Haute-Provence department
