= François-Jacques Guillotte =

French police officer (Died 1766)

François-Jacques Guillotte (? Paris – 1766 ?, id.) was an 18th-century French police officer and Encyclopédiste.

== Life ==
When the Diderot family moved at #6 rue Mouffetard in the Parisian parish of Saint-Médard in April 1746, there lived also François-Jacques Guillotte, a police officer in their vicinity. The two men became friends, they united their common interest in philosophy and in the development of the society of the Ancien régime.

François-Jacques Guillotte wrote the article Pont militaire (military bridge) for the Encyclopédie by Denis Diderot.

== Sources ==
- Joseph-Marie Quérard, La France littéraire, t. 5, Paris, Firmin-Didot, 1862, 1833, p. 611.
