= Quartier Saint-Victor =

Coordinates: 48.846255°N 2.3547629°E

Saint-Victor
- Quartier Saint-Victor
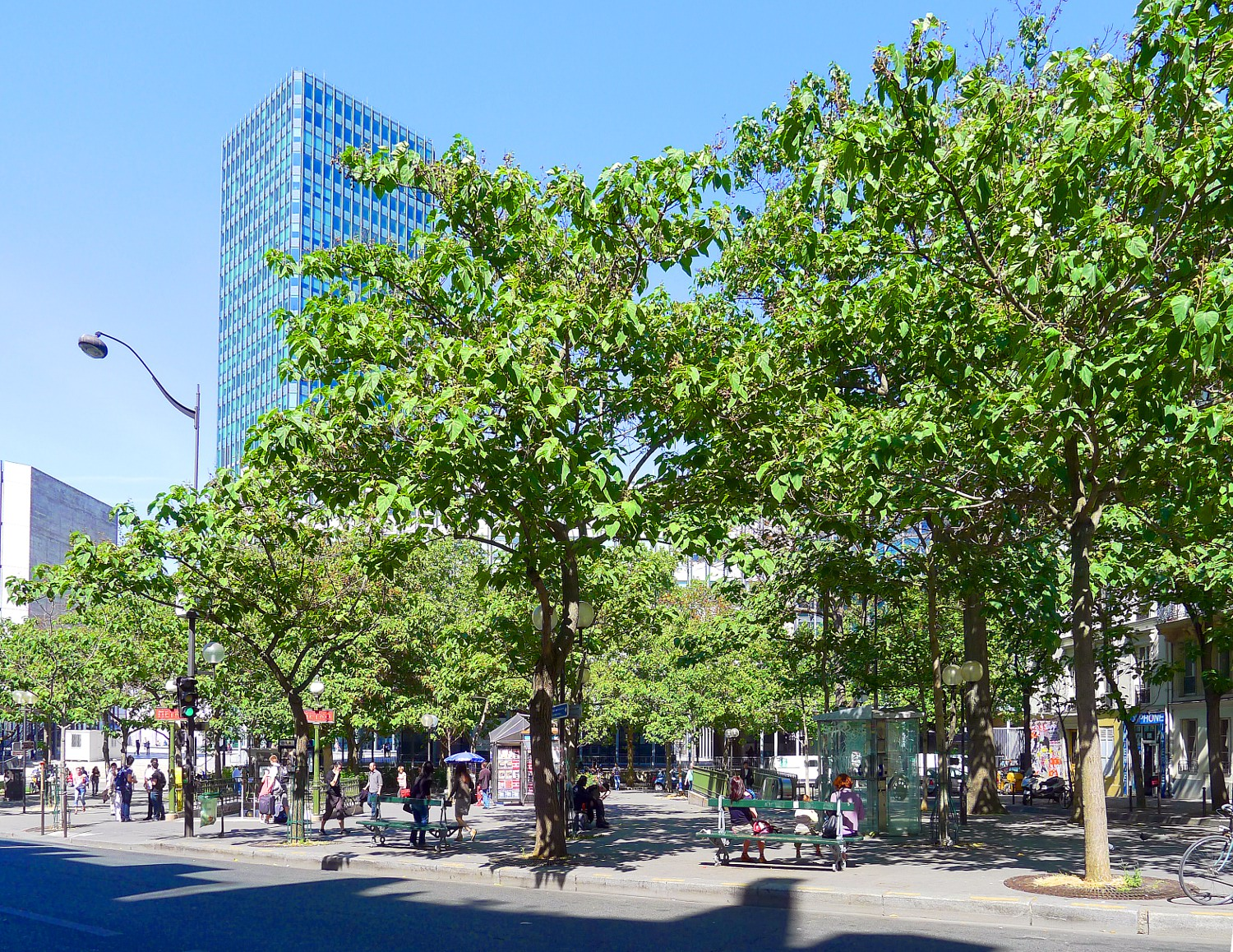
- Place Jussieu
- Interactive map of Saint-Victor
- Country: France
- Region: Île-de-France
- Ville: Paris
- Arrondissement: 5th

Area
  - Total: 0.604 km^{2} (0.233 sq mi)

Population (2016)
  - Total: 19,444
  - Density: 11,744/km^{2} (30,420/sq mi)

The Quartier Saint-Victor is the 17th administrative district of Paris, located in the 5th arrondissement. It takes its name from the former Faubourg Saint-Victor, which in turn derived its name from the Abbey of Saint-Victor.

== Boundaries ==
The Saint-Victor district is bounded by Rue Lacépède and Rue Cuvier to the south, the Seine to the northeast, and Rue Descartes and Rue de la Montagne-Sainte-Geneviève to the west.

== History ==
The quartiers of the 5th arrondissement.

In the 1st century, a Gallo-Roman amphitheater in Lutetia drew local crowds to this spot. Although abandoned at the end of the 3rd century, the amphitheater was later repaired in 577 AD by the King Chilperic I, who staged performances there.

A document from 1284, cited by Du Boulay, refers to a location known as "Les Arènes" (The Arenas) in front of Saint-Victor. The Philip Augustus Wall cut across the site in the 14th century. The modern-day Saint-Victor district straddles this wall: the northwestern half comprises the former Terre d'Alez, while the southeastern half corresponds to the Quartier du Jardin-des-Plantes.

The banks of the Seine served as a timber depot and a shipyard. Inside the Philip Augustus Wall lay the Grands Degrés district—situated on the northeastern slope of the Montagne Sainte-Geneviève, facing the Archbishop's Palace—while the area outside the wall featured a mix of vegetable gardens, the Saint-Victor Abbey, and a residential suburb of the same name. Also located outside the wall after 1612 was the Hôpital de la Pitié; this hospital was relocated in 1911—with its original buildings subsequently demolished—to its current site adjacent to the Hôpital de la Salpêtrière. The abbey, closed in 1790, was demolished in 1810 and later replaced by the Paris Faculty of Science (now the IPG) and the Halle aux Vins (now the Jussieu campus).

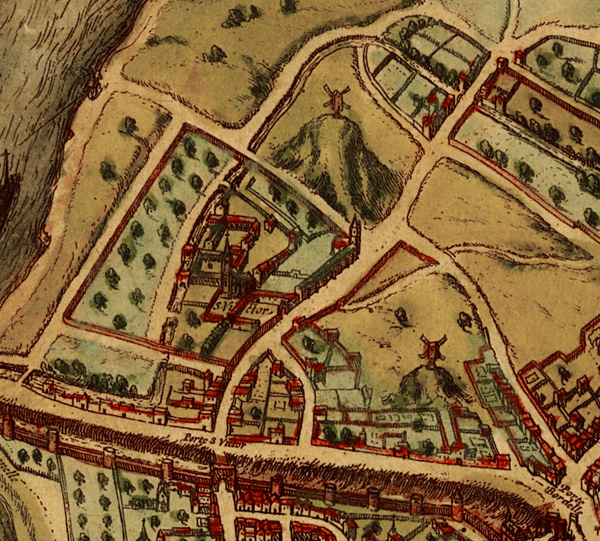
Quartier Saint-Victor, map of Münster (1572).

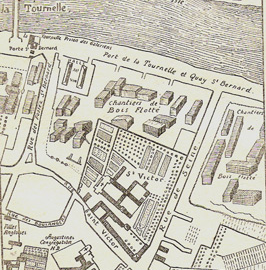
Quartier Saint-Victor, Félibien map (1734).

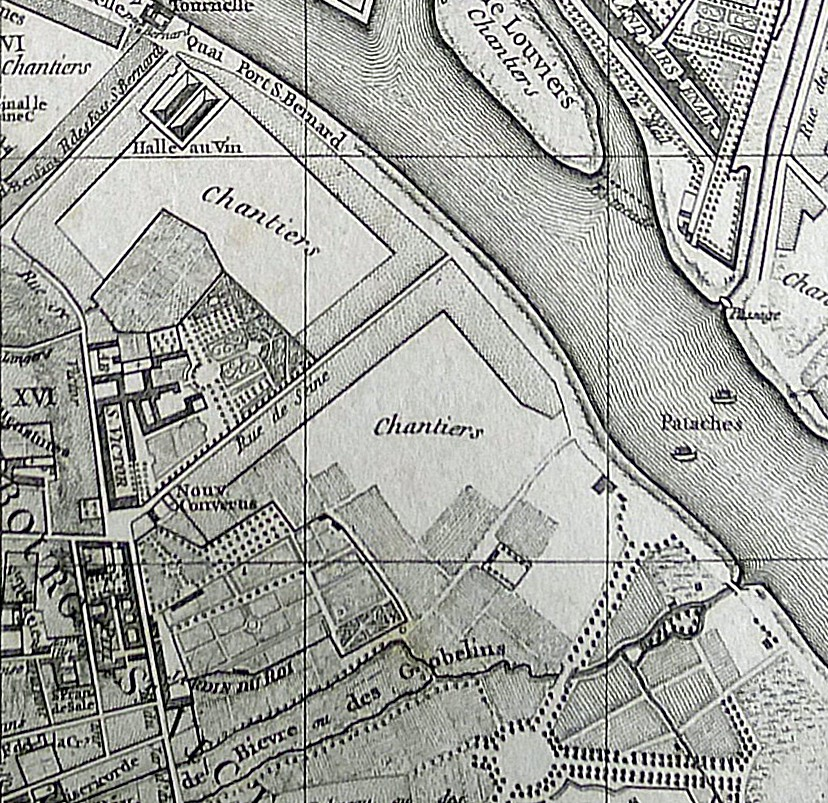
Saint-Victor Abbey, Vaugondy's plan (1760).

== Specific sites ==
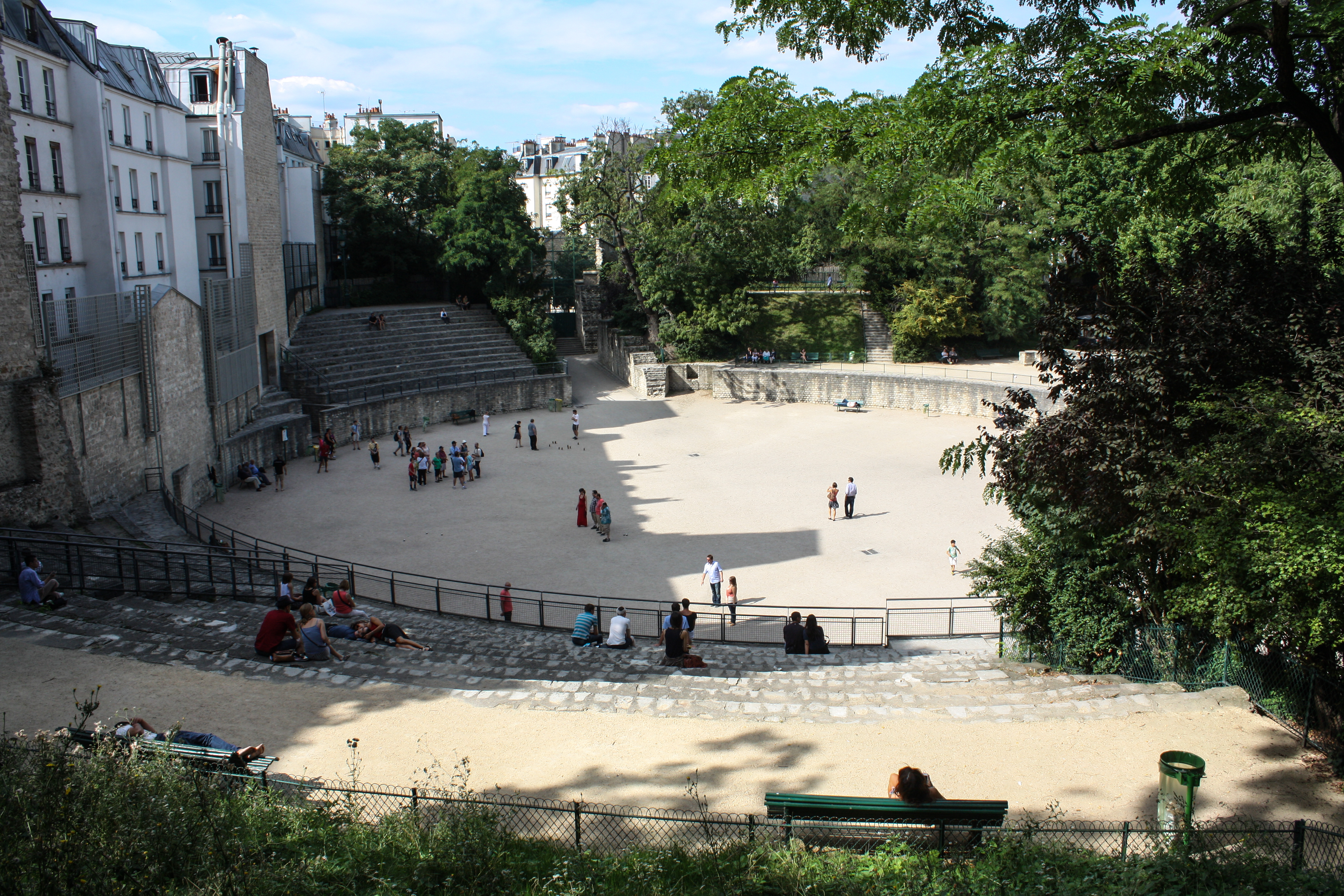
The arènes de Lutèce.

- Arènes de Lutèce
- Jussieu campus
- Institut du monde arabe
- Maison de la Mutualité
- Church of Saint-Nicolas-du-Chardonnet
- Collège des Bernardins
- Musée de la Sculpture en Plein Air
- Former École polytechnique campus, now the Ministry of Higher Education and Research

== Bibliography ==
- Gonzague Truc, Le quartier St-Victor et le Jardin des Plantes, Firmin-Didot, Paris, 1930.
