= Rue Mouffetard =

Street in Paris, France

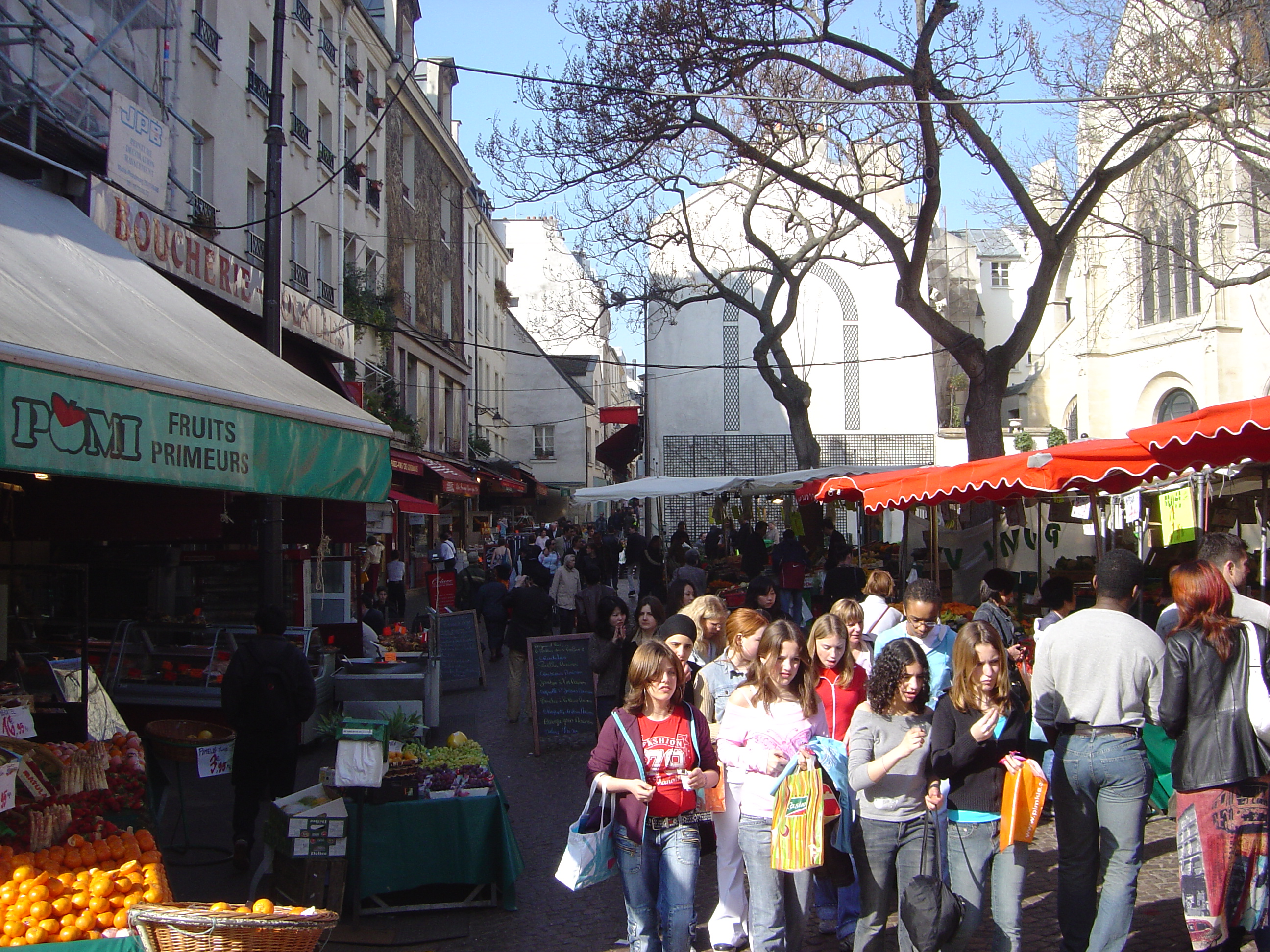
- Street market on the Rue Mouffetard

- Location within Paris
- Length: 605 m (1,985 ft)
- Width: 7 m (23 ft)
- Arrondissement: 5th
- Quarter: Saint-Victor; Jardin des Plantes; Val-de-Grâce; Sorbonne
- Coordinates: 48°50′31″N 2°20′59″E
- From: 3 rue Thouin
- To: Rue Censier; 2 rue Pascal

Construction
- Completion: c. 1st century

The Rue Mouffetard (French pronunciation: [ʁy muftaʁ]) is a street in the 5th arrondissement of Paris, France.

== Description ==
The Rue Mouffetard is one of Paris's oldest and liveliest neighbourhoods. These days the area has many restaurants, shops, and cafés, and a regular open market. It is centered on the Place de la Contrescarpe, at the junction of the Rue Mouffetard and the Rue Lacépède. Its southern terminus is at the Square Saint-Médard where there is a permanent open-air market. At its northern terminus, it becomes the Rue Descartes at the crossing of the Rue Thouin. It is closed to normal motor traffic much of the week, and is predominantly a pedestrian street.

== Name origin ==
The Rue Mouffetard runs along a flank of the Montagne Sainte-Geneviève, which was called the Mont Cétarius or Mont Cetardus from Roman times; many historians consider "Mouffetard" to be a derivation of this early name. Over the centuries, the Rue Mouffetard has appeared as the Rue Montfétard, Maufetard, Mofetard, Moufetard, Mouflard, Moufetard, Moftard, Mostard, and also the Rue Saint-Marcel, Rue du Faubourg Saint-Marceau ("street of the suburb Saint-Marceau") and Rue de la Vieille Ville Saint-Marcel ("street of the old town Saint-Marcel").

== History ==
The origins of this thoroughfare are ancient, dating back to Neolithic times. As with today's Rue Galande, Rue Lagrange, Rue de la Montagne Sainte-Geneviève and Rue Descartes, it was a Roman road running from the Roman Rive Gauche city south to Italy.

From the Middle Ages, a church along this section of roadway became centre of a Bourg Saint-Médard (Saint-Médard village), and from 1724 was integrated into Paris as the main artery of the Faubourg Saint Médard.

The Diderot family moved at no. 6 rue Mouffetard in April 1746, where lived also François-Jacques Guillotte, a police officer who wrote an article (Pont militaire) for the Encyclopédie by Diderot.

The area remained relatively unchanged because of its location on the Montagne Sainte-Geneviève, which protected it from Baron Haussmann's redevelopment during the reign of Napoleon III.

The École de Paris painter Isaac Frenkel Frenel lived in the street from the 1950s until his death in 1981.

== Cultural references ==
- In 1910, Alexander Bogdanov delivered a lecture about Empiriomonism.
- Lenin replied quoting his own Materialism and Empiriocriticism in response.
- At the beginning of Chapter IV of The Sun Also Rises (1926), Ernest Hemingway describes a taxicab heading down the Rue Mouffetard from the Place de la Contrescarpe.
- The area and the street featured prominently in Krzysztof Kieślowski's Trois Couleurs: Bleu (1992), and stands as the central locale and 'character' in Agnès Varda's L'opéra-mouffe (1958).
- The iconic Henri Cartier-Bresson photograph Rue Mouffetard was taken on this street in 1954.
