= Martine Franck =

Belgian photographer (1938–2012)

- Franck in 1972, by Henri-Cartier Bresson
- Born: 2 April 1938; Antwerp, Belgium
- Died: 16 August 2012 (aged 74); Paris, France
- Occupations: Documentary and portrait photographer
- Spouse: Henri Cartier-Bresson (m. 1970; died 2004)
- Children: 1

Martine Franck (2 April 1938 – 16 August 2012) was a British-Belgian documentary and portrait photographer. She was a member of Magnum Photos for more than 32 years. Franck was the second wife of Henri Cartier-Bresson and co-founder and president of the Henri Cartier-Bresson Foundation.

== Early life ==
Franck was born in Antwerp to the Belgian banker Louis Franck and his British wife, Evelyn. After her birth the family moved almost immediately to London. A year later, her father joined the British army, and the rest of the family were evacuated to the United States, spending the remainder of the Second World War on Long Island and in Arizona.

Franck's father was an amateur art collector who often took his daughter to galleries and museums. Franck was in boarding school from the age of six onwards, and her mother sent her a postcard every day, frequently of paintings. Ms. Franck, attended Heathfield School, an all-girls boarding school close to Ascot in England, and studied the history of art from the age of 14. "I had a wonderful teacher who really galvanized me," she says. "In those days she took us on outings to London, which was the big excitement of the year for me."

== Career ==
Franck studied art history at the University of Madrid and at the Ecole du Louvre in Paris. After struggling through her thesis (on French sculptor Henri Gaudier-Brzeska and the influence of cubism on sculpture), she said she realized she had no particular talent for writing, and turned to photography instead.

In 1963, Franck's photography career started following trips to the Far East, having taken pictures with her cousin's Leica camera. Returning to France in 1964, now possessing a camera of her own, Franck became an assistant to photographers Eliot Elisofon and Gjon Mili at Time-Life. By 1969 she was a busy freelance photographer for magazines such as Vogue, Life and Sports Illustrated, and the official photographer of the Théâtre du Soleil (a position she held for 48 years). From 1970 to 1971 she worked in Paris at the Agence Vu photo agency, and in 1972 she co-founded the Viva agency.

In 1980, Franck joined the Magnum Photos cooperative agency as a "nominee", and in 1983 she became a full member. She was one of a very small number of women to be accepted into the agency.

In 1983, she completed a project for the now-defunct French Ministry of Women's Rights and in 1985 she began collaborating with the non-profit International Federation of Little Brothers of the Poor. In 1993, she first traveled to the Irish island of Tory where she documented the tiny Gaelic community living there. She also traveled to Tibet and Nepal, and with the help of Marilyn Silverstone photographed the education system of the Tibetan Tulkus monks. In 2003 and 2004 she returned to Paris to document the work of theater director Robert Wilson who was staging La Fontaine's fables at the Comédie Française.

Nine books of Franck's photographs have been published, and in 2005 Franck was made a chevalier of the French Légion d'Honneur.

Franck continued working even after she was diagnosed with bone cancer in 2010. Her last exhibition was in October 2011 at the Maison Européenne de la Photographie. The exhibit consisted of 62 portraits of artists "coming from somewhere else” collected from 1965 through 2010. This same year, there were collections of portraits shown at New York's Howard Greenberg Gallery and at the Claude Bernard Gallery, Paris.

== Work ==
Franck was well known for her documentary-style photographs of important cultural figures such as the painter Marc Chagall, philosopher Michel Foucault and poet Seamus Heaney, and of remote or marginalized communities such as Tibetan Buddhist monks, elderly French people, and isolated Gaelic speakers. Michael Pritchard, the Director-General of the Royal Photographic Society, observed: "Martine was able to work with her subjects and bring out their emotions and record their expressions on film, helping the viewer understand what she had seen in person. Her images were always empathetic with her subject." In 1976, Frank took one of her most iconic photos of bathers beside a pool in Le Brusc, Provence. By her account, she saw them from a distance and rushed to photograph the moment, all the while changing the roll of film in her camera. She quickly closed the lens just at the right moment, when happened to be most intense.

She cited as influences the portraits of British photographer Julia Margaret Cameron, the work of American photojournalist Dorothea Lange and American documentary photographer Margaret Bourke-White. In 2010, she told The New York Times that photography "suits my curiosity about people and human situations."

She worked outside the studio, using a 35 mm Leica camera, and preferring black and white film. The British Royal Photographic Society has described her work as "firmly rooted in the tradition of French humanist documentary photography."

== Personal life ==
Franck was often described as elegant, dignified and shy.

In 1966, she met Henri Cartier-Bresson, thirty years her senior, when she was photographing Paris fashion shows for The New York Times. In 2010, she told interviewer Charlie Rose "his opening line was, ‘Martine, I want to come and see your contact sheets.’" They married in 1970, had one child, a daughter named Mélanie, and remained together until his death in 2004.

Throughout her career Franck, who was sometimes described as a feminist, was uncomfortable being in the shadow of her famous husband and wanted to be recognized for her own work. In 1970, the Institute of Contemporary Arts in London planned to stage Franck's first solo exhibition: when she saw that the invitations included her husband's name and said he would be present at the launch, she cancelled the show. Franck once said that she put her husband's career ahead of her own. In 2003 Franck and her daughter launched the Henri Cartier-Bresson Foundation to promote Cartier-Bresson's photojournalism, and in 2004 Franck became its president.

Franck was diagnosed with leukemia in 2010, and died in Paris in 2012 at 74 years old.

== Publications ==
- Martine Franck: Dun jour, l'autre. France: Seuil, 1998. ISBN 978-2-02-034771-6
- Tibetan Tulkus, images of continuity. London: Anna Maria Rossi & Fabio Rossi Publications, 2000. ISBN 978-0-9520992-8-4
- Tory Island Images. Wolfhound Press, 2000. ISBN 978-0-86327-561-6
- Martine Franck Photographe, Musée de la Vie romantique, Paris-Musées/Adam Biro, 2002. ISBN 978-2-87660-346-2
- Fables de la Fontaine (production by Robert Wilson), Actes Sud. Paris, 2004
- Martine Franck: One Day to the Next. Aperture, 2005. ISBN 978-0-89381-845-6
- Martine Franck. Louis Baring. London: Phaidon, 2007. ISBN 978-0-7148-4781-8
- Martine Franck: Photo Poche. France: Actes Sud, 2007. ISBN 978-2-7427-6725-0
- Women/Femmes, Steidl, 2010. ISBN 978-3-86930-149-5
- Venus d'ailleurs, Actes Sud, 2011

== Exhibitions ==
- La vie et la mort, Rencontres d'Arles, Arles, France, 1980
- Martine Franck Photographe, Musée de la Vie romantique, Paris, 2004
- Les Rencontres, Rencontres d'Arles, Arles, France, 2004
