= Cortis & Sonderegger =

Team of two Swiss artists

Cortis & Sonderegger is a collaborative team of two Swiss artists, Jojakim Cortis and Adrian Sonderegger. They are best known for their photographs of their physical recreations of famous photographs.

== Life ==
Cortis was born in 1978 in Aachen, Germany. Sonderegger was born in 1980 in Bülach, Switzerland. Since 2001 they have lived and worked in Zurich, Switzerland. Their collaboration began in 2005 while they were students at the Zurich University of the Arts.

== Work ==
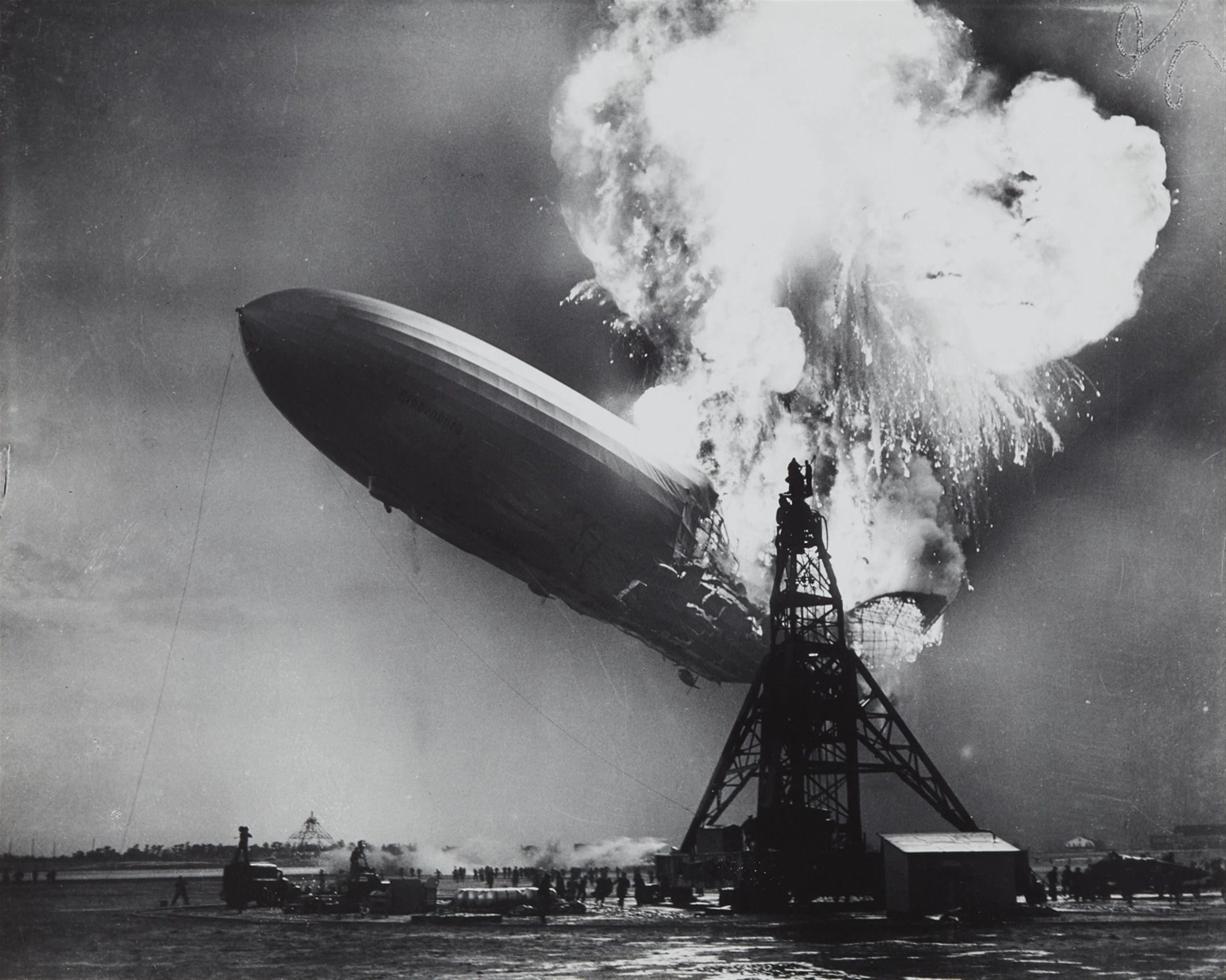
Sam Shere photograph of the Hindenburg disaster, used as a source by Cortis & Sonderegger

The duo are best known for their physical representations of famous photographs, titled Icons and begun in 2012. The recreations involve the use of precision model-making to create three-dimensional miniature dioramas of the scene in the original photograph. Once the diorama is built, the final product is a photograph of the overall scene, often including some of the tools and materials used in its making.

Andreas Gursky's Rhein, the most expensive photograph ever sold, was the first subject of their recreations.

Other subjects of their recreations include:

- the 1937 photography of the Hindenberg disaster by Sam Shere,
- Charles Levy's 1945 photograph of the Nagasaki nuclear bomb detonation, titled Making of 208-N-43888 by Charles Levy, 19452013,
- the 1934 photograph of the Loch Ness Monster, titled Making of “Nessie” (by Marmaduke Wetherell, 1934)
- the 1989 "Tank Man" photograph of a man obstructing a tank during the Tiananmen square crackdown, and
- Edwin Aldrin's photograph of man's first step on the Moon.
- Robert Frank's photograph of two people viewing a parade in New Jersey.
- a photograph of the 2004 Indian Ocean Tsunami.

== Collections ==
- Their work Making of Tiananmen (by Stuart Franklin, 1989) is included in the collection of the Museum of Contemporary Photography at Columbia College Chicago.
- Making of 'AS11-40-5878' (by Edwin Aldrin, 1969) is included in the collection of the Museum of Fine Arts, Houston.

== Awards ==
- 2015/2016 Vevey International Photography Award : Broncolor Prize
