= Henri Cartier-Bresson =

French photographer (1908–2004)

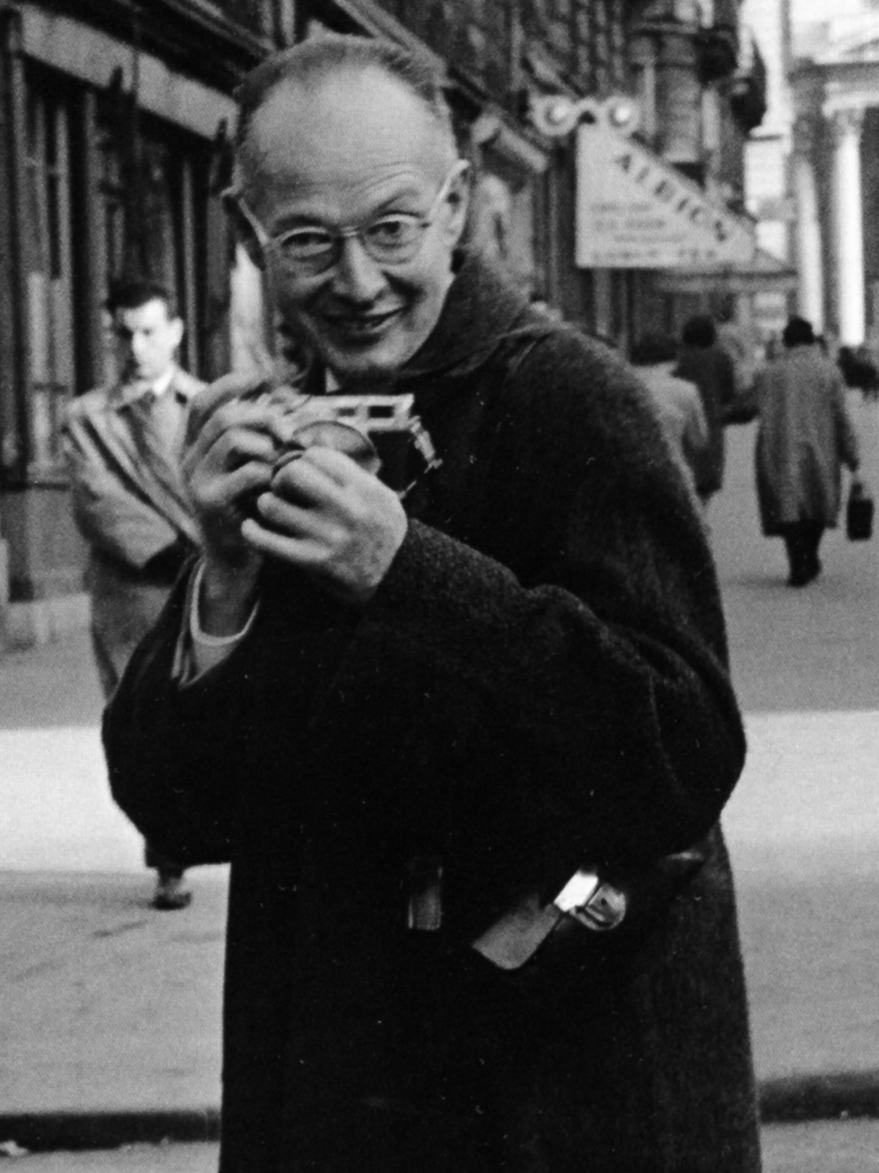
- Cartier-Bresson in 1954
- Born: 22 August 1908; Chanteloup-en-Brie, France
- Died: 3 August 2004 (aged 95); Céreste, France
- Burial place: Montjustin, France
- Education: Lycée Condorcet, Paris
- Occupations: Photographer; painter
- Spouses: Ratna Mohini (m. 1937; div. 1967) Martine Franck (m. 1970)
- Children: 1
- Awards: Grand Prix National de la Photographie (1981); Hasselblad Award (1982)

Henri Cartier-Bresson (French: [ɑ̃ʁi kaʁtje bʁɛsɔ̃]; 22 August 1908 – 3 August 2004) was a French humanist photographer and artist. He was considered a master of candid photography, and was an early user of 35mm film. He pioneered the genre of street photography and viewed capturing what he named the decisive moment as the essence of the very best pictures.

Cartier-Bresson was one of the founding members of Magnum Photos in 1947. In the 1970s he largely discontinued his photographic work, instead opting to paint.

== Early life ==
Henri Cartier-Bresson was born in Chanteloup-en-Brie, Seine-et-Marne, France. His father was a wealthy textile manufacturer, whose Cartier-Bresson thread was a staple of French sewing kits. His mother's family were cotton merchants and landowners from Normandy, where Henri spent part of his childhood. His mother was descended from Charlotte Corday.

The Cartier-Bresson family lived in a bourgeois neighborhood in Paris, Rue de Lisbonne, near Place de l'Europe and Parc Monceau. Since his parents were providing financial support, Henri pursued photography more freely than his contemporaries. Henri also sketched.

Young Henri took holiday snapshots with a Box Brownie; he later experimented with a 3×4 inch view camera. He was raised in traditional French bourgeois fashion, and was required to address his parents with formal vous rather than tu. His father assumed that his son would take up the family business, but Henri was strong-willed and also feared this prospect.

Cartier-Bresson attended École Fénelon, a Catholic school that prepared students for the Lycée Condorcet. A governess called "Miss Kitty", who came from across the Channel, instilled in him the love of, and competence in, the English language. The proctor caught him reading a book by Rimbaud or Mallarmé, and reprimanded him, "Let's have no disorder in your studies!". Cartier-Bresson said, "He used the informal 'tu', which usually meant you were about to get a good thrashing. But he went on, 'You're going to read in my office.' Well, that wasn't an offer he had to repeat."

=== Painting ===
He studied painting when he was just 5 years old, taking an apprenticeship in his uncle Louis' studio. After trying to learn music, Cartier-Bresson was introduced to oil painting by his uncle Louis, a gifted painter and winner of the Prix de Rome in 1910. But his painting lessons were cut short when uncle Louis was killed in World War I.

In 1927, Cartier-Bresson entered a private art school and the Lhote Academy, the Parisian studio of the Cubist painter and sculptor André Lhote, alongside William Klein, Frédéric Menguy and Gerda Sutton. Lhote's ambition was to integrate the Cubists' approach to reality with classical artistic forms; he wanted to link the French classical tradition of Nicolas Poussin and Jacques-Louis David to Modernism. Cartier-Bresson also studied painting with society portraitist Jacques Émile Blanche.

During that period, he read Dostoevsky, Schopenhauer, Rimbaud, Nietzsche, Mallarmé, Freud, Proust, Joyce, Hegel, Engels and Marx. Lhote took his pupils to the Louvre to study classical artists and to Paris galleries to study contemporary art. Cartier-Bresson's interest in modern art was combined with an admiration for the works of the Renaissance masters: Jan van Eyck, Paolo Uccello, Masaccio, Piero della Francesca. Cartier-Bresson regarded Lhote as his teacher of "photography without a camera".

=== Surrealists photography influence ===
Although Cartier-Bresson became frustrated with Lhote's "rule-laden" approach to art, the rigorous theoretical training later helped him identify and resolve problems of artistic form and composition in photography. In the 1920s, schools of photographic realism were popping up throughout Europe but each had a different view on the direction photography should take. The Surrealist movement, founded in 1924, was a catalyst for this paradigm shift. Cartier-Bresson began socializing with the Surrealists at the Café Cyrano, in the Place Blanche. He met a number of the movement's leading protagonists, and was drawn to the Surrealist movement's technique of using the subconscious and the immediate to influence their work. The historian Peter Galassi explains:

The Surrealists approached photography in the same way that Aragon and Breton...approached the street: with a voracious appetite for the usual and unusual...The Surrealists recognized in plain photographic fact an essential quality that had been excluded from prior theories of photographic realism. They saw that ordinary photographs, especially when uprooted from their practical functions, contain a wealth of unintended, unpredictable meanings.

Cartier-Bresson matured artistically in this stormy cultural and political atmosphere. But, although he knew the concepts, he couldn't express them; dissatisfied with his experiments, he destroyed most of his early paintings.

=== Cambridge and army ===
From 1928 to 1929, Cartier-Bresson studied art, literature, and English at the University of Cambridge, where he became bilingual. In 1930, he was conscripted into the French Army and stationed at Le Bourget near Paris, a time about which he later remarked: "And I had quite a hard time of it, too, because I was toting Joyce under my arm and a Lebel rifle on my shoulder."

=== Receives first camera ===
In 1929, Cartier-Bresson's air squadron commandant placed him under house arrest for hunting without a licence. Cartier-Bresson met American expatriate Harry Crosby at Le Bourget, who persuaded the commandant to release Cartier-Bresson into his custody for a few days. The two men both had an interest in photography, and Harry presented Henri with his first camera. They spent their time together taking and printing pictures at Crosby's home, Le Moulin du Soleil (The Sun Mill), near Paris in Ermenonville, France. Crosby later said Cartier-Bresson "looked like a fledgling, shy and frail, and mild as whey." Embracing the open sexuality offered by Crosby and his wife Caresse, Cartier-Bresson fell into an intense sexual relationship with her that lasted until 1931.

=== Escape to Africa ===
Two years after Harry Crosby died by suicide, Cartier-Bresson's affair with Caresse Crosby ended in 1931, leaving him broken-hearted. During conscription he read Conrad's Heart of Darkness. This gave him the idea of escaping and finding adventure on the Côte d'Ivoire in French colonial Africa. He survived by shooting game and selling it to local villagers. From hunting, he learned methods which he later used in photography. On the Côte d'Ivoire, he contracted blackwater fever, which nearly killed him. While still feverish, he sent instructions to his grandfather for his own funeral, asking to be buried in Normandy, at the edge of the Eawy Forest while Debussy's String Quartet was played. Although Cartier-Bresson took a portable camera (smaller than a Brownie Box) to Côte d'Ivoire, only seven photographs survived the tropics.

=== Photography ===
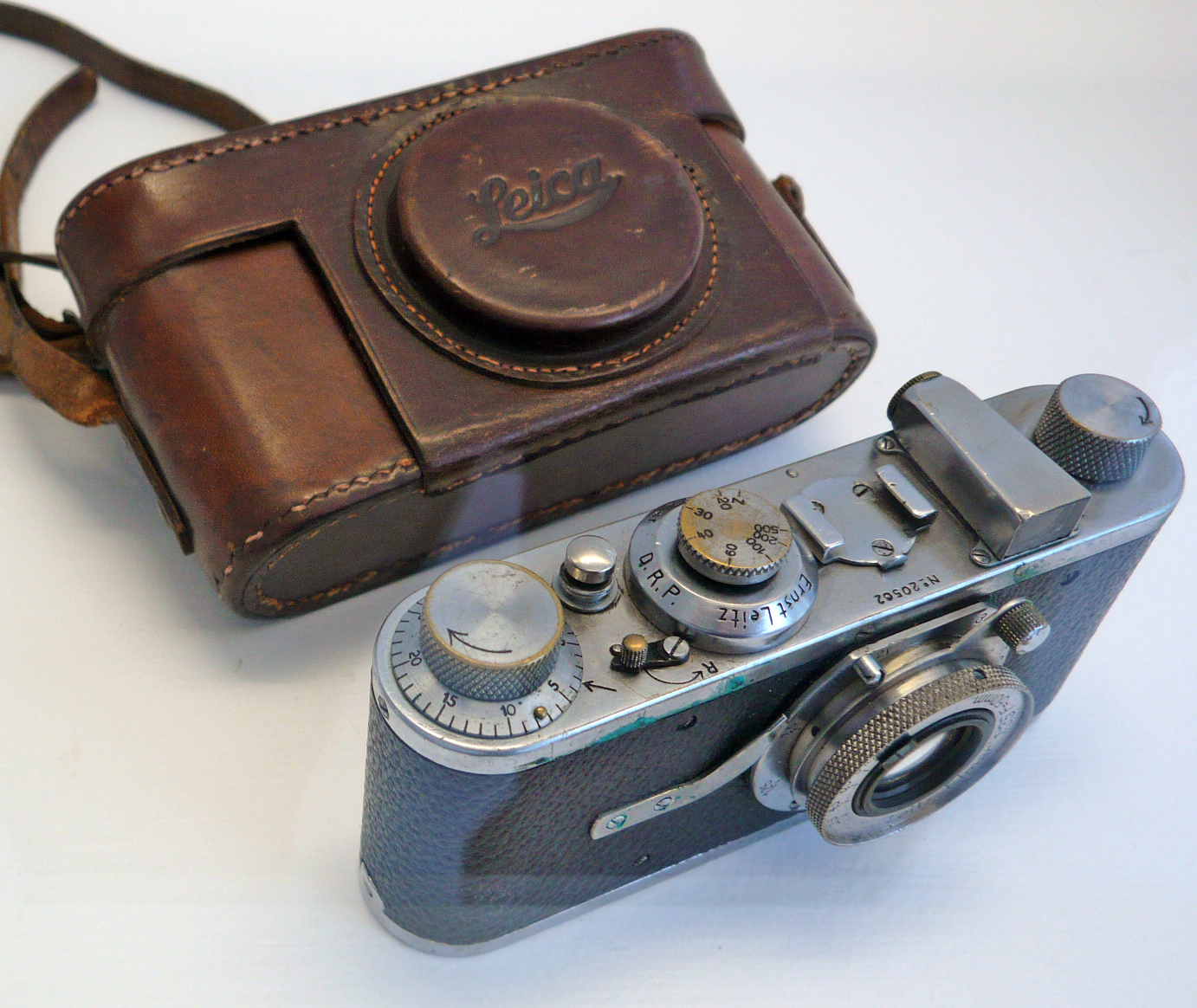
Cartier-Bresson's first Leica

Returning to France, Cartier-Bresson recuperated in Marseille in late 1931 and deepened his relationship with the Surrealists. He became inspired by a 1930 photograph by Hungarian photojournalist Martin Munkacsi showing three naked young African boys, caught in near-silhouette, running into the surf of Lake Tanganyika. Titled Three Boys at Lake Tanganyika, this captured the freedom, grace and spontaneity of their movement and their joy at being alive. That photograph inspired him to stop painting and to take up photography seriously. He explained, "I suddenly understood that a photograph could fix eternity in an instant."

He acquired the Leica camera with 50 mm lens in Marseilles that would accompany him for many years. The anonymity that the small camera gave him in a crowd or during an intimate moment was essential in overcoming the formal and unnatural behavior of those who were aware of being photographed. He enhanced his anonymity by painting all shiny parts of the Leica with black paint. The Leica opened up new possibilities in photography—the ability to capture the world in its actual state of movement and transformation. Restless, he photographed in Berlin, Brussels, Warsaw, Prague, Budapest and Madrid. His photographs were first exhibited at the Julien Levy Gallery in New York in 1933, and subsequently at the Ateneo Club in Madrid. In 1934 in Mexico, he shared an exhibition with Manuel Álvarez Bravo. In the beginning, he did not photograph much in his native France. It would be years before he photographed there extensively.

In 1934, Cartier-Bresson met a young Polish intellectual, a photographer named David Szymin who was called "Chim" because his name was difficult to pronounce. Szymin later changed his name to David Seymour. The two had much in common culturally. Through Chim, Cartier-Bresson met a Hungarian photographer named Endré Friedmann, who later changed his name to Robert Capa.

== United States exhibits ==
Cartier-Bresson traveled to the United States in 1935 with an invitation to exhibit his work at New York's Julien Levy Gallery. He shared display space with fellow photographers Walker Evans and Manuel Álvarez Bravo. Carmel Snow of Harper's Bazaar gave him a fashion assignment, but he fared poorly since he had no idea how to direct or interact with the models. Nevertheless, Snow was the first American editor to publish Cartier-Bresson's photographs in a magazine. While in New York, he met photographer Paul Strand, who did camerawork for the Depression-era documentary The Plow That Broke the Plains.

=== Filmmaking ===
When he returned to France, Cartier-Bresson applied for a job with renowned French film director Jean Renoir. He acted in Renoir's 1936 film Partie de campagne and in the 1939 La Règle du jeu, for which he served as second assistant and played a butler. Renoir made Cartier-Bresson act so he could understand how it felt to be on the other side of the camera. Cartier-Bresson also helped Renoir make Life Belongs to Us (1936; French: La vie est à nous), a film for the Communist party on the 200 families, including his own, who ran France. During the Spanish Civil War, Cartier-Bresson co-directed an anti-fascist film with Herbert Kline, to promote the Republican medical services.

=== Photojournalism start ===
Cartier-Bresson's first photojournalist photos to be published came in 1937 when he covered the coronation of King George VI and Queen Elizabeth, for the French weekly Regards. He focused on the new monarch's adoring subjects lining the London streets, and took no pictures of the king. His photo credit read "Cartier", as he was hesitant to use his full family name. Between 1937 and 1939, Cartier-Bresson worked as a photographer for the French Communists' evening paper, Ce soir. With Chim and Capa, Cartier-Bresson was a leftist, but he did not join the French Communist party.

== Marriage ==
In 1937, Cartier-Bresson married a Javanese dancer, Ratna Mohini. They lived in a fourth-floor servants' flat in Paris at 19, rue Neuve-des-Petits-Champs (now rue Danielle Casanova), a large studio with a small bedroom, kitchen, and bathroom where Cartier-Bresson developed film.

== World War II service ==
When World War II broke out in September 1939, Cartier-Bresson joined the French Army as a Corporal in the film and photo unit of the French Third Army. During the Battle of France, in June 1940 at St. Dié in the Vosges Mountains, he was captured by German soldiers and spent 35 months in prisoner-of-war camps doing forced labor under the Nazis. He twice tried and failed to escape from the prison camp, and was punished by solitary confinement. His third escape was successful and he hid on a farm in Touraine before getting false papers that allowed him to travel in France. In France, he worked for the underground, aiding other escapees and working secretly with other photographers to cover the occupation and then the liberation of France. In 1943, he dug up his beloved Leica camera, which he had buried in Vosges farmland.

At the end of the war he was asked by the American Office of War Information to make a documentary, Le Retour (The Return), about returning French prisoners and displaced persons. His film spurred a retrospective of his work at the Museum of Modern Art (MoMA), that would later tour the country. The show debuted in 1947 accompanied by the publication of his first book, The Photographs of Henri Cartier-Bresson. Lincoln Kirstein and Beaumont Newhall wrote the book's texts.

== Magnum Photos ==
In early 1947, Cartier-Bresson, with Robert Capa, David Seymour, William Vandivert and George Rodger founded Magnum Photos. Capa's brainchild, Magnum was a cooperative picture agency owned by its members. The team split photo assignments among the members. Rodger, who had quit Life in London after covering World War II, would cover Africa and the Middle East. Chim, who spoke a variety of European languages, would work in Europe. Cartier-Bresson would be assigned to India and China. Vandivert, who had also left Life, would work in America, and Capa would work anywhere that had an assignment. Maria Eisner managed the Paris office and Rita Vandivert, Vandivert's wife, managed the New York office and became Magnum's first president.

Cartier-Bresson achieved international recognition for his coverage of Gandhi's funeral in India in 1948 and the last stage of the Chinese Civil War in 1949. He covered the last six months of the Kuomintang administration and the first six months of the Maoist People's Republic. He also photographed the last surviving Imperial eunuchs in Beijing, as the city was being liberated by the communists. In Shanghai, he often worked in the company of photojournalist Sam Tata, whom Cartier-Bresson had previously befriended in Bombay. From China, he went on to Dutch East Indies (Indonesia), where he documented the gaining of independence from the Dutch. In 1950, Cartier-Bresson had traveled to the South India. He had visited Tiruvannamalai, a town in the Indian State of Tamil Nadu and photographed the last moments of Ramana Maharishi, Sri Ramana Ashram and its surroundings. A few days later he also visited and photographed Sri Aurobindo, Mother and Sri Aurobindo Ashram, Pondicherry.

Magnum's mission was to "feel the pulse" of the times and some of its first projects were People Live Everywhere, Youth of the World, Women of the World and The Child Generation. Magnum aimed to use photography in the service of humanity, and provided arresting, widely viewed images.

=== The Decisive Moment ===
1952 US edition of Cartier-Bresson's 1952 book The Decisive Moment (Images à la sauvette)

In 1952, Cartier-Bresson published his book Images à la sauvette, whose English-language edition was titled The Decisive Moment, (although the French-language title actually translates as "images on the sly" or "hastily taken images") Images à la sauvette included a portfolio of 126 of his photos from the East and the West. The book's cover was drawn by Henri Matisse. For his 4,500-word philosophical preface, Cartier-Bresson took his keynote text from Volume 2 of the Memoirs of 17th century Cardinal de Retz, "Il n'y a rien dans ce monde qui n'ait un moment decisif" ("There is nothing in this world that does not have a decisive moment"). Cartier-Bresson applied this to his photographic style. He said: "Photographier: c'est dans un même instant et en une fraction de seconde reconnaître un fait et l'organisation rigoureuse de formes perçues visuellement qui expriment et signifient ce fait" ("To me, photography is the simultaneous recognition, in a fraction of a second, of the significance of an event as well as of a precise organization of forms which give that event its proper expression.").

The title Images à la Sauvette came from Tériade, the Greek-born French publisher whom Cartier-Bresson admired. Dick Simon of Simon & Schuster came up with the English title The Decisive Moment. Margot Shore, Magnum's Paris bureau chief, translated Cartier-Bresson's French preface into English.

"Photography is not like painting", Cartier-Bresson told The Washington Post in 1957. "There is a creative fraction of a second when you are taking a picture. Your eye must see a composition or an expression that life itself offers you, and you must know with intuition when to click the camera. That is the moment the photographer is creative", he said. "Oop! The Moment! Once you miss it, it is gone forever." The photo, Rue Mouffetard, Paris, taken in 1954 by Cartier-Bresson, is a classic example of capturing a decisive moment.

Cartier-Bresson held his first exhibition in France at the Pavillon de Marsan in 1955.

== Later career ==
Cartier-Bresson's photography took him to many places, including China, Mexico, Canada, the United States, India, Japan, Portugal and the Soviet Union. While traveling in China in 1958, Cartier-Bresson documented the construction of the Ming Tombs Reservoir. He became the first Western photographer to photograph "freely" in the post-war Soviet Union.

Artist Amadour has noted that Cartier-Bresson photographed Marilyn Monroe,Clark Gable, and Montgomery Clift at the Mapes Hotel in Reno, Nevada, during the press preview of The Misfits (1961 film), the final film of Monroe and Gable.

In 1962, on behalf of Vogue, he went to Sardinia for about twenty days. There he visited Nuoro, Oliena, Orgosolo Mamoiada Desulo, Orosei, Cala Gonone, Orani (hosted by his friend Costantino Nivola), San Leonardo di Siete Fuentes, and Cagliari.

Cartier-Bresson withdrew as a principal of Magnum (which still distributes his photographs) in 1966 to concentrate on portraiture and landscapes.

He was also close friends with brothers Alberto Giacometti and Diego Giacometti in Paris.

In 1967, he was divorced from his first wife of 30 years, Ratna (known as "Elie"). In 1968, he began to turn away from photography and return to his passion for drawing and painting. He admitted that perhaps he had said all he could through photography. He married Magnum photographer Martine Franck, thirty years younger than himself, in 1970. The couple had a daughter, Mélanie, in May 1972. He held his first exhibition of drawings at the Carlton Gallery in New York in 1975. That year he also worked on one of his final photographic projects, documenting daily life in New Jersey at the request of the local public-broadcast television station WNET.

== Death and legacy ==
Cartier-Bresson died in Céreste (Alpes-de-Haute-Provence, France) on 3 August 2004, 19 days before his 96th birthday. No cause of death was announced. He was buried in the local cemetery nearby in Montjustin and was survived by his wife, Martine Franck, and daughter, Mélanie.

Cartier-Bresson worked for more than three decades on assignment for Life and other journals. During this period, he travelled widely, documenting major events of the 20th century, including the Spanish Civil War, the liberation of Paris in 1944, the Chinese Civil War and the establishment of the People’s Republic of China, the assassination of Mahatma Gandhi, the May 1968 protests in Paris, and the Berlin Wall. He also produced portraits of figures such as Albert Camus, Pablo Picasso, Colette, Henri Matisse, Ezra Pound, and Alberto Giacometti.

In addition to covering historical events and prominent cultural figures, many of his best-known photographs depict everyday life, including Behind the Gare Saint-Lazare.

Cartier-Bresson did not like to be photographed and treasured his privacy. Photographs of Cartier-Bresson are scant. When he accepted an honorary degree from Oxford University in 1975, he held a paper in front of his face to avoid being photographed. In a Charlie Rose interview in 2000, Cartier-Bresson noted that it wasn't necessarily that he hated to be photographed, but it was that he was embarrassed by the notion of being photographed for being famous.

Cartier-Bresson believed that what went on beneath the surface was nobody's business but his own. He did recall that he once confided his innermost secrets to a Paris taxi driver, certain that he would never meet the man again.

In 2003, he created the Henri Cartier-Bresson Foundation in Paris with his wife, the Belgian photographer Martine Franck, and his daughter to preserve and share his legacy. In 2018, the foundation relocated from the Montparnasse district to Le Marais.

The highest price reached by one of his photographs was when Behind the Gare Saint-Lazare sold at Christie's, on 17 November 2011, by $590,455.

=== Cinéma vérité ===
Cartier-Bresson's photographs were also influential in the development of cinéma vérité film. In particular, he is credited as the inspiration for the National Film Board of Canada's early work in this genre with its 1958 Candid Eye series.

== Technique ==
Cartier-Bresson almost always used a Leica 35 mm rangefinder camera fitted with a normal 50 mm lens, or occasionally a wide-angle lens for landscapes. He often wrapped black tape around the camera's chrome body to make it less conspicuous. With fast black and white film and sharp lenses, he was able to photograph events unnoticed. No longer bound by a 4×5 press camera or a medium format twin-lens reflex camera, miniature-format cameras gave Cartier-Bresson what he called "the velvet hand...the hawk's eye."

He never photographed with flash, a practice he saw as "impolite...like coming to a concert with a pistol in your hand."

He believed in composing his photographs in the viewfinder, not in the darkroom. He showcased this belief by having nearly all his photographs printed only at full-frame and completely free of any cropping or other darkroom manipulation. He insisted that his prints be left uncropped so as to include a few millimeters of the unexposed negative around the image area, resulting in a black frame around the developed picture.

Cartier-Bresson worked exclusively in black and white, other than a few experiments in color. He disliked developing or making his own prints and showed a considerable lack of interest in the process of photography in general, likening photography with the small camera to an "instant drawing". Technical aspects of photography were valid for him only where they allowed him to express what he saw:

Constant new discoveries in chemistry and optics are widening considerably our field of action. It is up to us to apply them to our technique, to improve ourselves, but there is a whole group of fetishes which have developed on the subject of technique. Technique is important only insofar as you must master it in order to communicate what you see... The camera for us is a tool, not a pretty mechanical toy. In the precise functioning of the mechanical object perhaps there is an unconscious compensation for the anxieties and uncertainties of daily endeavor. In any case, people think far too much about techniques and not enough about seeing.

— Henri Cartier-Bresson

He started a tradition of testing new camera lenses by taking photographs of ducks in urban parks. He never published the images but referred to them as 'my only superstition' as he considered it a 'baptism' of the lens.

Cartier-Bresson is regarded as one of the art world's most unassuming personalities. He disliked publicity and exhibited a ferocious shyness since his days of hiding from the Nazis during World War II. Although he took many famous portraits, his face was little known to the world at large. This, presumably, helped allow him to work on the street undisturbed. He denied that the term "art" applied to his photographs. Instead, he thought that they were merely his gut reactions to fleeting situations that he had happened upon.

In photography, the smallest thing can be a great subject. The little human detail can become a leitmotiv.

— Henri Cartier-Bresson

== Publications ==
- 1947: The Photographs of Henri Cartier-Bresson. Text by Lincoln Kirstein. New York: Museum of Modern Art.
- 1952: The Decisive Moment. Texts and photographs by Cartier-Bresson. Cover by Henri Matisse. New York: Simon & Schuster. French edition
  - 2014: Göttingen: Steidl. ISBN 978-3869307886. Facsimile edition. First edition, 2014. Third edition, 2018. Includes booklet with an essay by Clément Chéroux, "A Bible for Photographers".
- 1954: Les Danses à Bali. Texts by Antonin Artaud on Balinese theater and commentary by Béryl de Zoete Paris: Delpire. German edition.
- 1955: The Europeans. Text and photographs by Cartier-Bresson. Cover by Joan Miró. New York: Simon & Schuster. French edition.
- 1955: People of Moscow. London: Thames & Hudson. French, German and Italian editions.
- 1956: China in Transition. London: Thames & Hudson. French, German and Italian editions.
- 1958: Henri Cartier-Bresson: Fotografie. Prague and Bratislava: Statni nakladatelstvi krasné. Text by Anna Farova.
- 1963: Photographs by Henri Cartier-Bresson. New York: Grossman Publisher. French, English, Japanese and Swiss editions.
- 1964: China. Photographs and notes on fifteen months spent in China. Text by Barbara Miller. New York: Bantam. French edition.
- 1966: Henri Cartier-Bresson and the Artless Art. Text by Jean-Pierre Montier. Translated from the French L'Art sans art d'Henri Cartier-Bresson by Ruth Taylor. New York: Bulfinch Press.
- 1968: The World of HCB. New York: Viking Press. French, German and Swiss editions. ISBN 978-0670786640
- 1969: Man and Machine. Commissioned by IBM. French, German, Italian and Spanish editions.
- 1970: France. Text by François Nourissier. London: Thames & Hudson. French and German editions.
- 1972: The Face of Asia. Introduction by Robert Shaplen. New York and Tokyo: John Weatherhill; Hong Kong: Orientations. French edition.
- 1973: About Russia. London: Thames & Hudson. French, German and Swiss editions.
- 1976: Henri Cartier-Bresson. Texts by Cartier-Bresson. History of Photography Series. History of Photography Series. French, German, Italian, Japanese and Italian editions.
- 1979: Henri Cartier-Bresson Photographer. Text by Yves Bonnefoy. New York: Bulfinch. French, English, German, Japanese and Italian editions. ISBN 978-0821207567
- 1983: Henri Cartier-Bresson. Ritratti = Henri Cartier-Bresson. Portraits. Texts by André Pieyre de Mandiargues and Ferdinando Scianna, "I Grandi Fotografi". Milan: Gruppo Editoriale Fabbri. English and Spanish editions.
- 1985:
  - Henri Cartier-Bresson en Inde. Introduction by Satyajit Ray, photographs and notes by Cartier-Bresson. Text by Yves Véquaud. Paris: Centre national de la photographie. English edition.
  - Photoportraits. Texts by André Pieyre de Mandiargues. London: Thames & Hudson. French and German editions.
- 1987:
  - Henri Cartier-Bresson. The Early Work. Texts by Peter Galassi. New York: Museum of Modern Art. French edition. ISBN 978-0870702624
  - Henri Cartier-Bresson in India. Introduction by Satyajit Ray, photographs and notes by Cartier-Bresson, texts by Yves Véquaud. London: Thames & Hudson. French edition.
- 1989:
  - L'Autre Chine. Introduction by Robert Guillain. Collection Photo Notes. Paris: Centre National de la Photographie.
  - Line by Line. Henri Cartier-Bresson's drawings. Introduction by Jean Clair and John Russell. London: Thames & Hudson. French and German editions.
- 1991:
  - America in Passing. Introduction by Gilles Mora. New York: Bulfinch. French, English, German, Italian, Portuguese and Danish editions.
  - Alberto Giacometti photographié par Henri Cartier-Bresson. Texts by Cartier-Bresson and Louis Clayeux. Milan: Franco Sciardelli.
- 1994:
  - A propos de Paris. Texts by Véra Feyder and André Pieyre de Mandiargues. London: Thames & Hudson. French, German and Japanese editions. ISBN 978-0821220641
  - Double regard. Drawings and photographs. Texts by Jean Leymarie. Amiens: Le Nyctalope. French and English editions.
  - Mexican Notebooks 1934–1964. Text by Carlos Fuentes. London: Thames & Hudson. French, Italian, and German editions.
  - L'Art sans art. Text de Jean-Pierre Montier. Paris: Editions Flammarion. English, German and Italian editions.
- 1996: L'Imaginaire d'après nature. Text by Cartier-Bresson. Paris: Fata Morgana. German and English editions'
- 1997: Europeans. Texts by Jean Clair. London: Thames & Hudson. French, German, Italian and Portuguese editions.
- 1998: Tête à tête. Texts by Ernst H. Gombrich. London: Thames & Hudson. French, German, Italian and Portuguese editions.
- 1999: The Mind's Eye. Text by Cartier-Bresson. New York: Aperture. French and German editions.
- 1999: Henri Cartier-Bresson: A Biography. Text by Pierre Assouline, translated by David Wilson. London: Thames and Hudson.
- 2001: Landscape Townscape. Texts by Erik Orsenna and Gérard Macé. London: Thames & Hudson. French, German and Italian editions.
- 2003: The Man, the Image and the World. Texts by Philippe Arbaizar, Jean Clair, Claude Cookman, Robert Delpire, Jean Leymarie, Jean-Noel Jeanneney and Serge Toubiana. London: Thames & Hudson, 2003. German, French, Korean, Italian and Spanish editions.
- 2005:
  - Henri Cartier-Bresson: The Mind's Eye: Writings on Photography and Photographers, Aperture; 1st edition. ISBN 978-0893818753
  - Henri Cartier-Bresson: Masters of Photography Series, Aperture; Third edition. ISBN 978-0893817442
- 2006: An Inner SIlence: The portraits of Henri Cartier-Bresson, New York: Thames & Hudson. Texts by Agnès Sire and Jean-Luc Nancy.
- 2010: Henri Cartier-Bresson: The Modern Century, The Museum of Modern Art, New York; Reprint edition. ISBN 978-0870707780
- 2015: Henri Cartier-Bresson: The Decisive Moment, Steidl; Pck Slp Ha edition. ISBN 978-3869307886
- 2017: Henri Cartier-Bresson Fotógrafo. Delpire.

== Filmography ==
=== Films directed by Cartier-Bresson ===
Cartier-Bresson was second assistant director to Jean Renoir in 1936 for La vie est à nous and Une partie de campagne, and in 1939 for La Règle du Jeu.

- 1937: Victoire de la vie. Documentary on the hospitals of Republican Spain: Running time: 49 minutes. Black and white.
- 1938: L’Espagne Vivra. Documentary on the Spanish Civil War and the post-war period. Running time: 43 minutes and 32 seconds. Black and white.
- 1938 Avec la brigade Abraham Lincoln en Espagne (English: With the Abraham Lincoln Brigade in Spain), Henri Cartier-Bresson ja Herbert Kline. Running time 21 minutes. Black and white.
- 1944–45: Le Retour. Documentary on prisoners of war and detainees. Running time: 32 minutes and 37 seconds. Black and white.
- 1969–70: Impressions of California. Running time: 23 minutes and 20 seconds. Color.
- 1969–70: Southern Exposures. Running time: 22 minutes and 25 seconds. Color.

=== Films compiled from photographs by Cartier-Bresson ===
- 1956: A Travers le Monde avec Henri Cartier-Bresson. Directed by Jean-Marie Drot and Henri Cartier-Bresson. Running time: 21 minutes. Black and white.
- 1963: Midlands at Play and at Work. Produced by ABC Television, London. Running time : 19 minutes. Black and white.
- 1963–65: Five fifteen-minute films on Germany for the Süddeutscher Rundfunk, Munich.
- 1967: Flagrants délits. Directed by Robert Delpire. Original music score by Diego Masson. Delpire production, Paris. Running time: 22 minutes. Black and white.
- 1969: Québec vu par Cartier-Bresson / Le Québec as seen by Cartier-Bresson. Directed by Wolff Kœnig. Produced by the Canadian Film Board. Running time: 10 minutes. Black and white.
- 1970: Images de France.
- 1991: Contre l'oubli : Lettre à Mamadou Bâ, Mauritanie. Short film directed by Martine Franck for Amnesty International. Editing : Roger Ikhlef. Running time: 3 minutes. Black and white.
- 1992: Henri Cartier-Bresson dessins et photos. Director: Annick Alexandre. Short film produced by FR3 Dijon, commentary by the artist. Running time: 2 minutes and 33 seconds. Color.
- 1997: Série "100 photos du siècle": L'Araignée d'amour: broadcast by Arte. Produced by Capa Télévision. Running time: 6 minutes and 15 seconds. Color.

=== Films about Cartier-Bresson ===
- Henri Cartier-Bresson, point d'interrogation by Sarah Moon, screened at Rencontres d'Arles festival in 1994
- Henri Cartier-Bresson: L'amour Tout Court (70 mins, 2001. Interviews with Cartier-Bresson.)
- Henri Cartier-Bresson: The Impassioned Eye (72 mins, 2006. Late interviews with Cartier-Bresson.)

== Exhibitions ==
- 1933 Cercle Ateneo, Madrid
- 1933 Julien Levy Gallery, New York
- 1934 Palacio de Bellas Artes, Mexico City (with Manuel Alvarez Bravo)
- 1947 Museum of Modern Art, New York, Martin-Gropius-Bau, Berlin, Germany; Museum of Modern Art, Rome, Italy; Dean Gallery, Edinburgh; Museum of Modern Art, New York City; Museo Nacional de Bellas Artes, Santiago, Chile
- 1952 Institute of Contemporary Arts, London
- 1955 Retrospektive – Musée des Arts décoratifs, Paris
- 1956 Photokina, Cologne, Germany
- 1963 Photokina, Cologne, Germany
- 1964 The Phillips Collection, Washington
- 1965–1967 2nd retrospective, Tokyo, Musée des Arts Décoratifs, Paris, New York, London, Amsterdam, Rome, Zurich, Cologne and other cities.
- 1970 En France – Grand Palais, Paris. Later in the US, USSR, Australia and Japan
- 1971 Les Rencontres d'Arles festival. Movies screened at Théatre Antique.
- 1972 Les Rencontres d'Arles festival. "Flagrant Délit" (Production Delpire) screened at Théatre Antique.
- 1974 Exhibition about the USSR, International Center of Photography, New York
- 1974–1997 Galerie Claude Bernard, Paris
- 1975 Carlton Gallery, New York
- 1975 Galerie Bischofberger, Zurich, Switzerland
- 1980 Brooklyn Museum, New York
- 1980 Photographs, Art Institute of Chicago
- 1980 Portraits – Galerie Eric Franck, Geneva, Switzerland
- 1981 Musée d'Art Moderne de la Ville de Paris, France
- 1982 Museum of Fine Arts, Boston
- 1982 Hommage à Henri Cartier-Bresson – Centre National de la Photographie, Palais de Tokyo, Paris
- 1983 Printemps Ginza – Tokyo
- 1983 Fundación Juan March – Madrid
- 1984 Osaka University of Arts, Japan
- 1984–1985 Paris à vue d’œil – Musée Carnavalet, Paris
- 1985 Henri Cartier-Bresson en Inde – Centre National de la Photographie, Palais de Tokyo, Paris
- 1985 Museo de Arte Moderno de México, Mexico
- 1986 L'Institut Français de Stockholm
- 1986 Pavillon d'Arte contemporanea, Milan, Italy
- 1986 Tor Vergata University, Rome, Italy
- 1987 Museum of Modern Art, Oxford, UK (drawings and photography)
- 1987 Early Photographs – Museum of Modern Art, New York
- 1988 Institut Français, Athen, Greece
- 1988 Palais Lichtenstein, Vienna, Austria
- 1988 Salzburger Landessammlung, Austria
- 1988 Group exhibition: "Magnum en Chine" at Rencontres d'Arles, France.
- 1989 Chapelle de l'École des Beaux-Arts, Paris
- 1989 Fondation Pierre Gianadda, Martigny, Switzerland (drawings and photographs)
- 1989 Mannheimer Kunstverein, Mannheim, Germany (drawings and photography)
- 1989 Printemps Ginza, Tokyo, Japan
- 1990 Galerie Arnold Herstand, New York
- 1991 Taipei Fine Arts Museum, Taiwan (drawings and photographs)
- 1992 Centro de Exposiciones, Saragossa and Logrono, Spain
- 1992 Hommage à Henri Cartier-Bresson – International Center of Photography, New York
- 1992 L'Amérique – FNAC, Paris
- 1992 Musée de Noyers-sur-Serein, France
- 1992 Palazzo San Vitale, Parma, Italy
- 1993 Photo Dessin – Dessin Photo, Arles, France
- 1994 Henri Cartier-Bresson, point d'interrogation by Sarah Moon screened at Rencontres d'Arles festival, France.
- 1994 Dessins et premières photos – La Caridad, Barcelona, Spain
- 1995 Dessins et Hommage à Henri Cartier-Bresson – CRAC (Centre Régional d’Art Contemporain) Valence, Drome, France
- 1996 Henri Cartier-Bresson: Pen, Brush and Cameras – The Minneapolis Institute of Arts, US
- 1997 Les Européens – Maison Européenne de la Photographie, Paris
- 1997 Henri Cartier-Bresson, dessins – Musée des Beaux-Arts, Montreal
- 1998 Galerie Beyeler, Basel, Switzerland
- 1998 Galerie Löhrl, Mönchengladbach, Germany
- 1998 Howard Greenberg Gallery, New York
- 1998 Kunsthaus Zürich, Zurich, Switzerland
- 1998 Kunstverein für die Rheinlande und Westfalen, Düsseldorf, Germany
- 1998 Line by Line – Royal College of Art, London
- 1998 Tête à Tête – National Portrait Gallery, London
- 1998–1999 Photographien und Zeichnungen – Baukunst Galerie, Cologne, Germany
- 2003–2005 Rétrospective, Bibliothèque nationale de France, Paris; La Caixa, Barcelona; Martin Gropius Bau, Berlin; Museum of Modern Art, Rome; Dean Gallery, Edinburgh; Museum of Modern Art, New York; Museo Nacional de Bellas Artes, Santiago, Chile
- 2004 Baukunst Galerie, Cologne
- 2004 Martin-Gropius-Bau, Berlin
- 2004 Museum Ludwig, Cologne
- 2008 Henri Cartier-Bresson's Scrapbook Photographs 1932–46, National Media Museum, Bradford, UK
- 2008 National Gallery of Modern Art, Mumbai, India
- 2008 Santa Catalina Castle, Cadiz, Spain
- 2009 Musée de l'Art Moderne, Paris
- 2010 Museum of Modern Art, New York
- 2010 The Art Institute of Chicago, Chicago
- 2011 Museum of Design Zürich
- 2011 High Museum of Art, Atlanta, GA
- 2011 Maison de la Photo, Toulon, France
- 2011 Kunstmuseum Wolfsburg, Germany
- 2011 Queensland Art Gallery, Brisbane, Australia
- 2011-2012 KunstHausWien, Vienna, Austria
- 2014 Centre Georges Pompidou, Paris.
- 2015 Palacio de Bellas Artes, Mexico City
- 2015 Ateneum, Helsinki
- 2017 Leica Gallery, San Francisco.
- 2017 Museo Botero/Banco de la Republica, Bogota Colombia
- 2018 International Center of Photography, New York
- 2021 Le Grand jeu, Bibliothèque Nationale de France, Paris, France
- 2022 Cina 1948-49/1958, MUDEC, Milan, Italy
- 2022 L'expérience du paysage, Fondation Henri Cartier-Bresson, Paris, France
- 2026 Les Européens (The Europeans), Fondation Henri Cartier-Bresson, Paris France

== Public collections ==
Cartier-Bresson's work is held in the following public collections:

- Bibliothèque Nationale de France, Paris, France
- De Menil Collection, Houston, Texas, US
- Foundation Henri Cartier-Bresson, Paris, France
- University of Fine Arts, Osaka, Japan
- Victoria and Albert Museum, London, United Kingdom
- Maison Européenne de la Photographie, Paris, France
- Musée Carnavalet, Paris, France
- Museum of Modern Art, New York City
- The Art Institute of Chicago, Illinois, US
- Jeu de Paume, Paris, France
- J. Paul Getty Museum, Los Angeles
- Institute for Contemporary Photography, New York City
- The Philadelphia Art Institute, Philadelphia, Pennsylvania, US
- The Museum of Fine Arts, Houston, US
- Kahitsukan Kyoto Museum of Contemporary Art, Kyoto, Japan
- Museum of Modern Art, Tel Aviv, Israel
- Moderna Museet, Stockholm, Sweden
- International Photography Hall of Fame, St.Louis, Missouri

== Awards ==
- 1948: Overseas Press Club of America Award
- 1953: The A.S.M.P. Award
- 1954: Overseas Press Club of America Award
- 1959: The Prix de la Société française de photographie
- 1960: Overseas Press Club of America Award
- 1964: Honorary Fellowship of the Royal Photographic Society
- 1964: Overseas Press Club of America Award
- 1967: The Cultural Award from the German Society for Photography (DGPh), with Edwin H. Land
- 1981: Grand Prix National de la Photographie
- 1982: Hasselblad Award
- 2003: Lifetime Achievement Award from the Lucie Awards
- 2006: Prix Nadar for the photobook Henri Cartier-Bresson: Scrapbook

== Sources ==
- Assouline, P. (2005). Henri Cartier-Bresson: A Biography. London: Thames & Hudson.
- Galassi, Peter (2010). Henri Cartier-Bresson: the Modern Century. London: Thames & Hudson.
- Montier, J. (1996). Portrait: First Sketch. Henri Cartier-Bresson and the Artless Art (p. 12). New York: Bulfinch Press.
- Warren, J (2005), Encyclopedia of Twentieth-Century Photography. Routledge
