= Henri Cartier-Bresson Foundation =

Art gallery and museum in Paris

- Fondation Henri Cartier-Bresson

- Location within Paris
- Established: 2003
- Location: Rue des Archives, 75003 Paris
- Coordinates: 48.8629°N 2.36009°E
- Type: Art museum
- Collections: Henri Cartier-Bresson, Martine Franck
- Founders: Henri Cartier-Bresson, Martine Franck, Mélanie Cartier-Bresson
- Director: François Hébel
- Website: www.henricartierbresson.org/en/

The Henri Cartier-Bresson Foundation (French: Fondation Henri Cartier-Bresson), also known as Fondation HCB, is an art gallery and non-profit organisation in Paris that was established to preserve and show the work of Henri Cartier-Bresson and Martine Franck, and show the work of others. It was set up in 2003 by the photographer and painter Cartier-Bresson, his wife, also a photographer, Franck, and their daughter, Mélanie Cartier-Bresson.

The Foundation hosts four solo exhibitions per year by a variety of photographers, painters, sculptors, and illustrators. Agnès Sire is its artistic director and François Hébel its director.

== Mission ==
The Foundation's mission is to preserve the archives of Henri Cartier-Bresson and Martine Franck, and show their work and the work of others. It also exists to help researchers and curators to work with those archives.

== Exhibitions ==
The Foundation hosts four solo exhibitions per year by a variety of photographers, painters, sculptors, and illustrators.

The inaugural exhibition at the Rue des Archives venue, in November 2018, was Martine Franck – A Retrospective, which then toured to Musée de l'Élysée in Switzerland, and Fotomuseum Antwerp in Belgium.

== Archive ==
Cartier-Bresson and Franck's archives consist of over 50,000 prints and 200,000 negatives, as well as all kinds of documents. Prior to 2018, the archives were scattered over four sites, but since then they have all been housed in the new building.

== History ==
The Foundation was set up by Cartier-Bresson, Franck and Mélanie Cartier-Bresson. Cartier-Bresson gave his personal collection of his photographs to the Foundation. It opened in 2003 in a renovated 19th-century building at 2 Impasse Lebouis in the Montparnasse district of Paris. Between 2003 and 2018 it had 100,000 visitors a year.

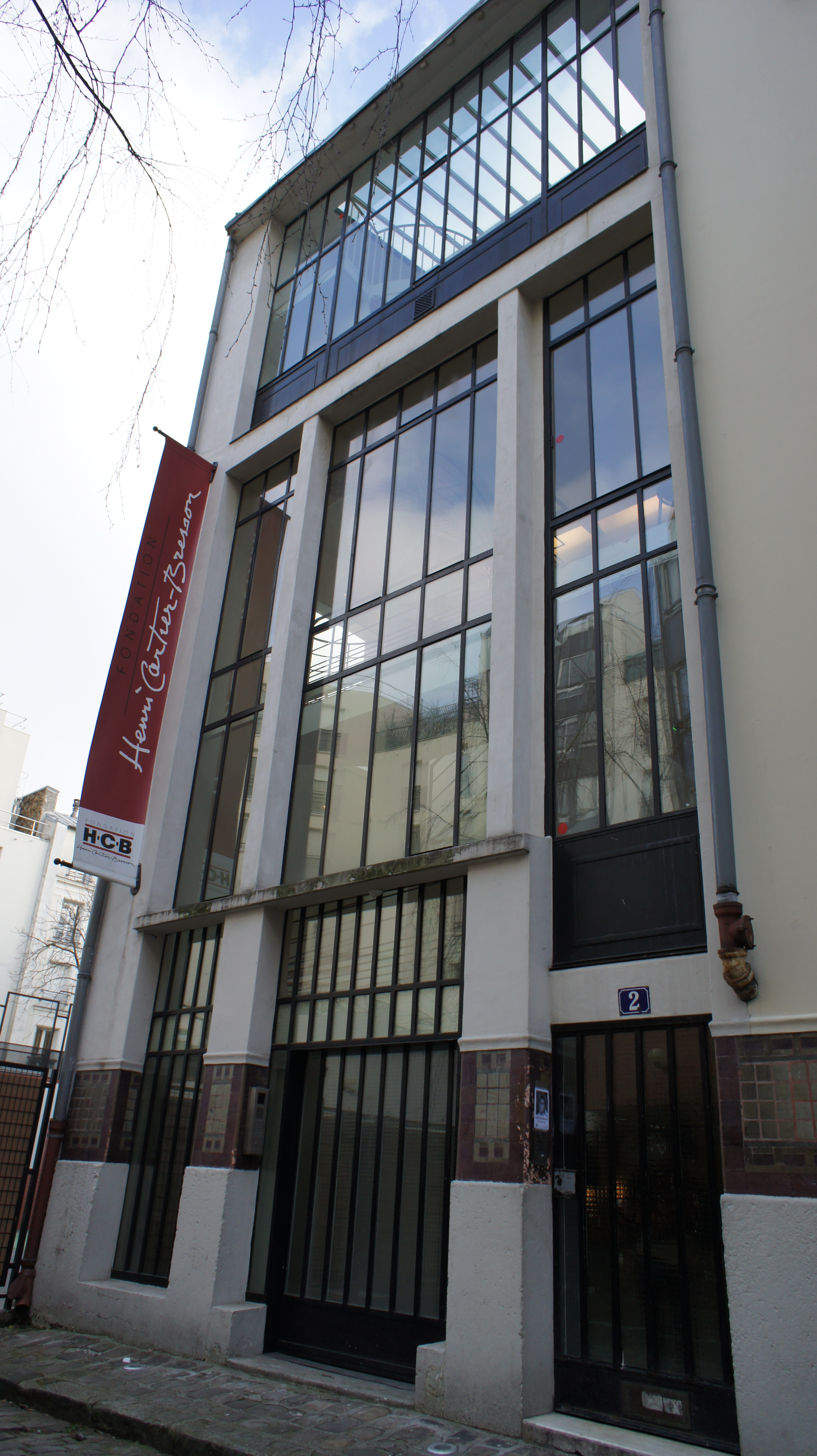
The Foundation's former building at Impasse Lebouis

In November 2018 it moved to 79 Rue des Archives, in the Marais district of Paris; a tall, narrow atelier in a 1913 building. The new building has significantly more exhibition and archive space than the previous, allowing for four exhibitions a year instead of three.

== Organisation ==
The non-profit Foundation is privately funded. A proportion of funds come from an endowment left by Franck, who died in 2012.

From 2003 Agnès Sire was its director. In November 2017 Sire became artistic director and François Hébel was appointed as director.

== HCB Award ==
The Foundation issues the HCB Award.

=== Winners ===
- 2021: Carolyn Drake for the project Centaur (working title)

== See also ==
- List of museums devoted to one photographer
