= Quartier Sainte-Avoye =

Coordinates: 48.8626998°N 2.3541355°E

Sainte-Avoye
- Quartier Sainte-Avoye
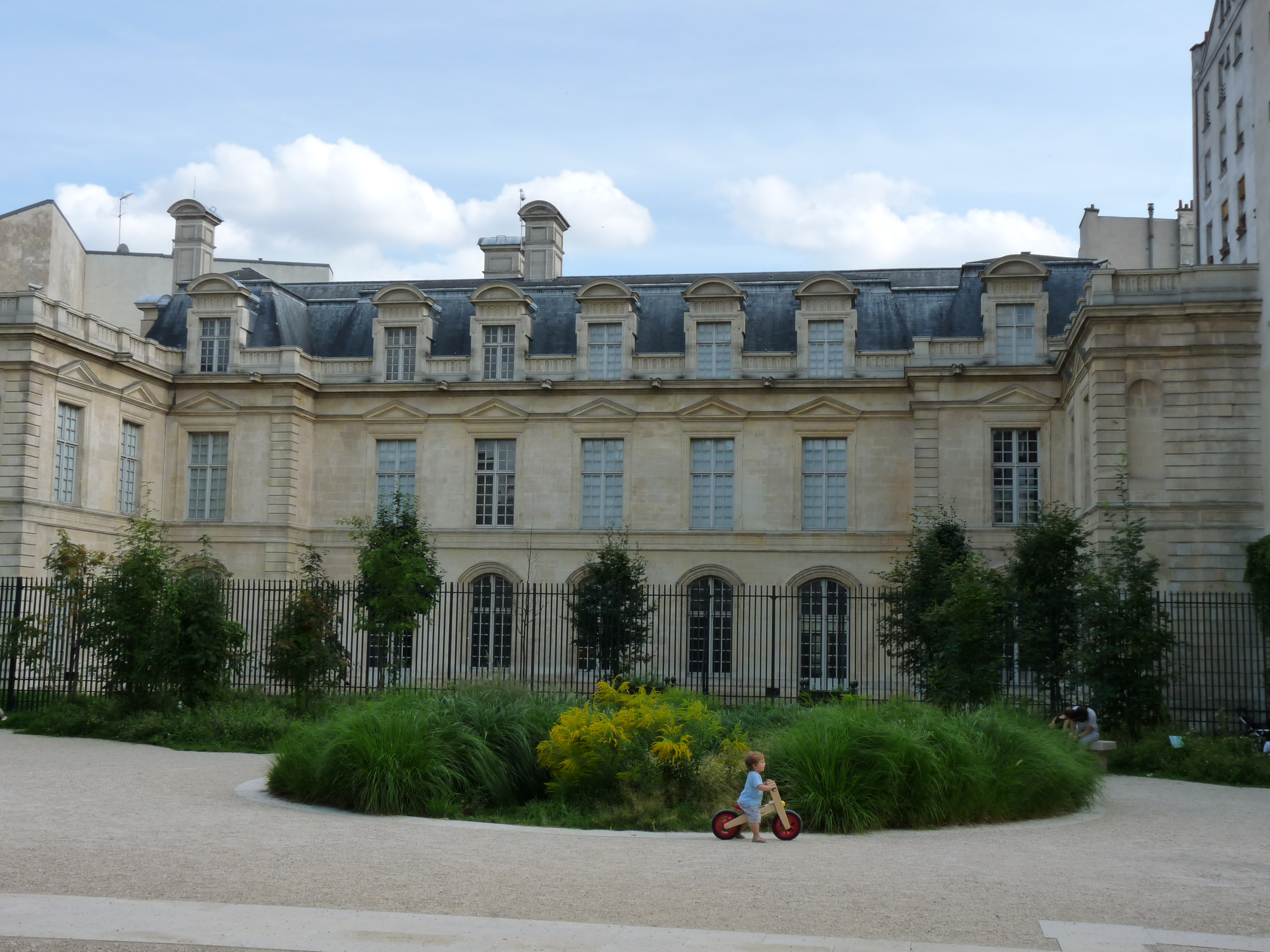
- Jardin Anne-Frank
- Country: France
- Region: Île-de-France
- Ville: Paris
- Arrondissement: 3rd

Area
  - Total: 0.213 km^{2} (0.082 sq mi)

Population (2016)
  - Total: 7,895
  - Density: 37,066/km^{2} (96,000/sq mi)

The Quartier Sainte-Avoye is the twelfth administrative district of Paris, located in the southwest of the 3rd arrondissement. It is named in honor of Saint Avoye, a 3rd-century martyr. Part of the present-day Rue du Temple, which runs through the district from south to north, was formerly called "Rue Sainte-Avoie".

The district also evokes the former Ursuline convent of Sainte-Avoye, which was dissolved in 1790.

Today, the district is home to a significant concentration of art galleries.:

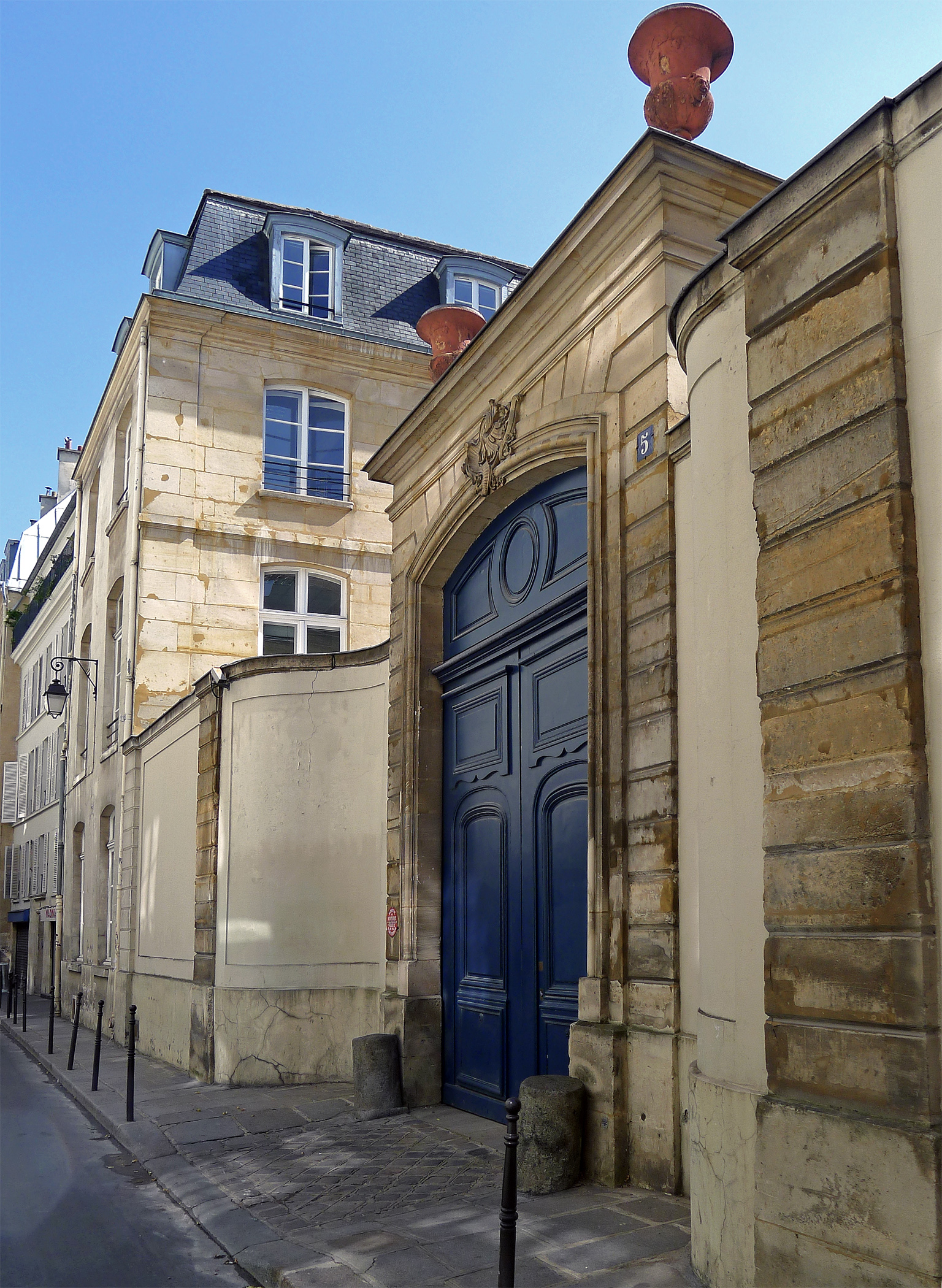
Formerly the Hôtel de Montmorency, now the Hôtel Thiroux de Lailly, rue de Montmorency.

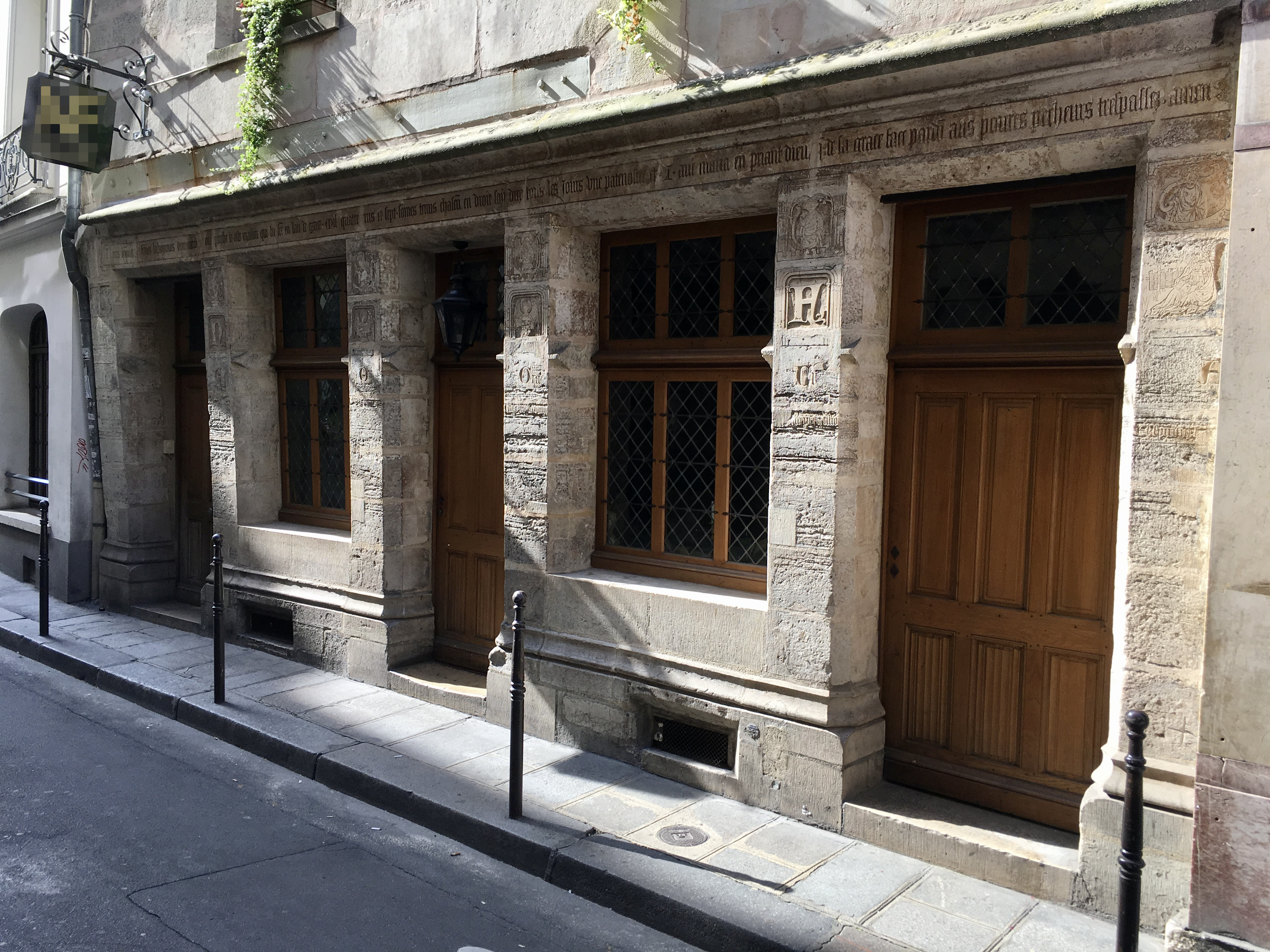
Nicolas Flamel's house, also on rue de Montmorency.

== Localisation ==
The Quartier Sainte-Avoye has been delimited since 1859

- to the south by Rue Rambuteau (border with the 4th arrondissement),
- to the east by Rue des Archives (border with the Quartier des Archives),
- to the north by Rue Pastourelle (border with the Quartier des Enfants-Rouges), and Rue des Gravilliers and Rue de Turbigo (border with the Quartier des Arts-et-Métiers),

to the west by a section of Boulevard de Sébastopol (border with the 1st and 2nd arrondissements).

== History ==
The old Quartier de Sainte-Avoye, from 1702 to 1789, differs from the current district of the same name. It was located between Rue de la Verrerie, Rue Vieille-du-Temple, Rue des Quatre-Fils, and Rue des Archives. The territory of the current district corresponds mainly to the southern part of the village of Saint-Martin-des-Champs, which resulted from the subdivision of land from the estate of the Abbey of Saint-Martin-des-Champs during the 13th century.

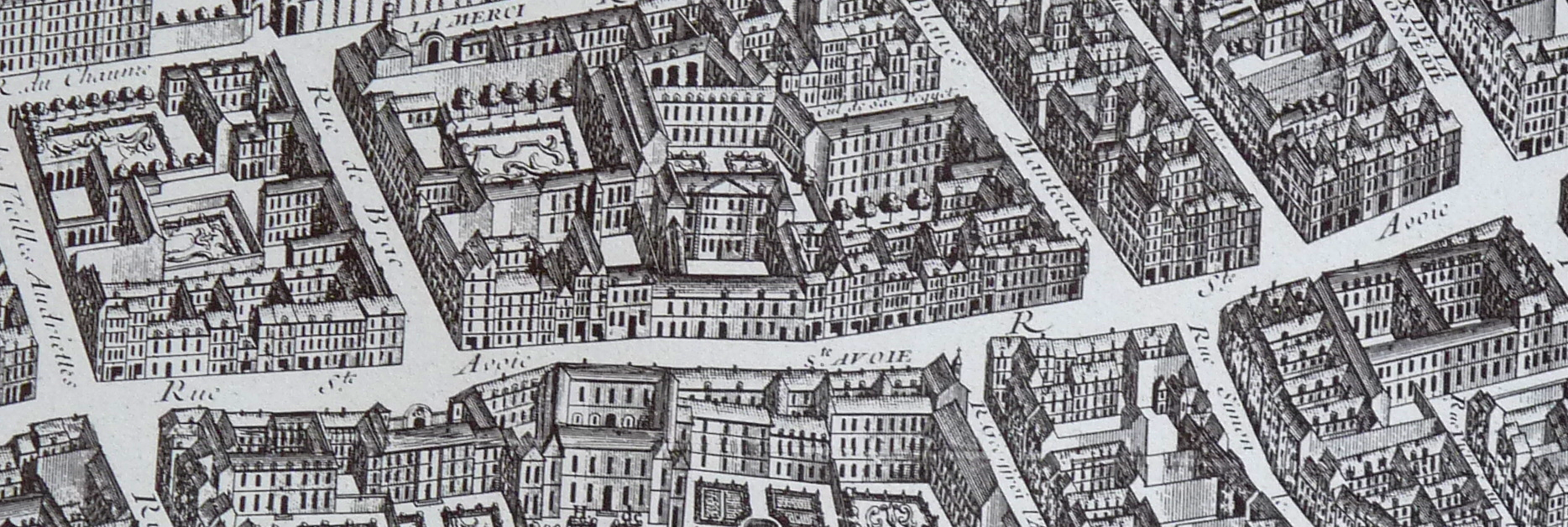
Rue Sainte-Avoie on Turgot's map (1739).
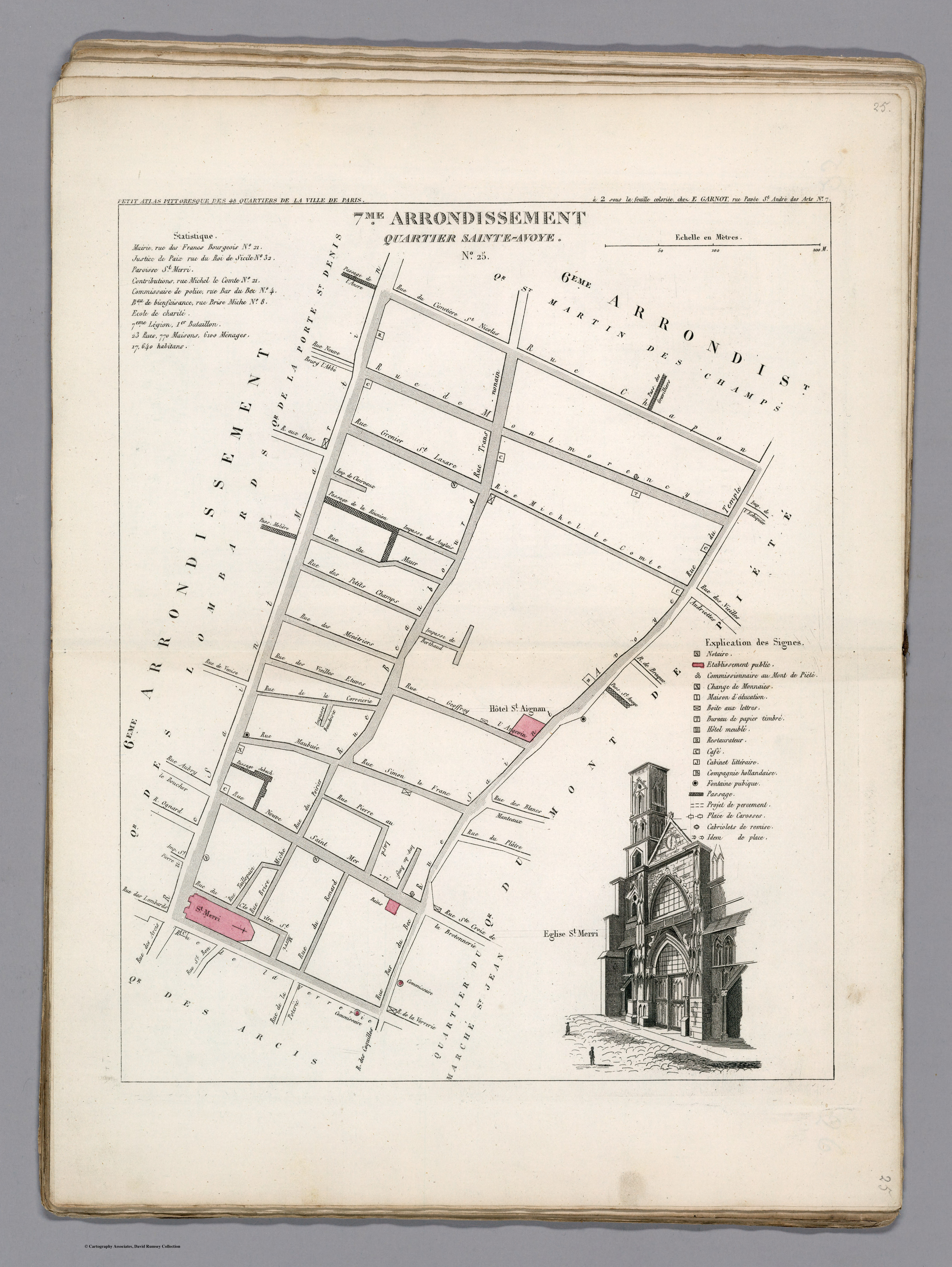
Map of the Sainte-Avoye district in the former 7th arrondissement in 1834.

The administrative districts of the 3rd arrondissement.

== Spelling ==
The spelling of the place name has fluctuated over the centuries; the one used for the administrative district and in use today in municipal documentation is "Sainte-Avoye".

== Main sites ==
=== Green space ===
- The Jardin Anne Frank, the only municipal public garden in the district.

=== Museums ===
- The Musée d'Art et d'Histoire du Judaïsme.
- The Musée de la Poupée (now closed).
