= Quartier des Archives =

Coordinates: 48.8596241°N 2.362539°E

Archives
- Quartier des Archives
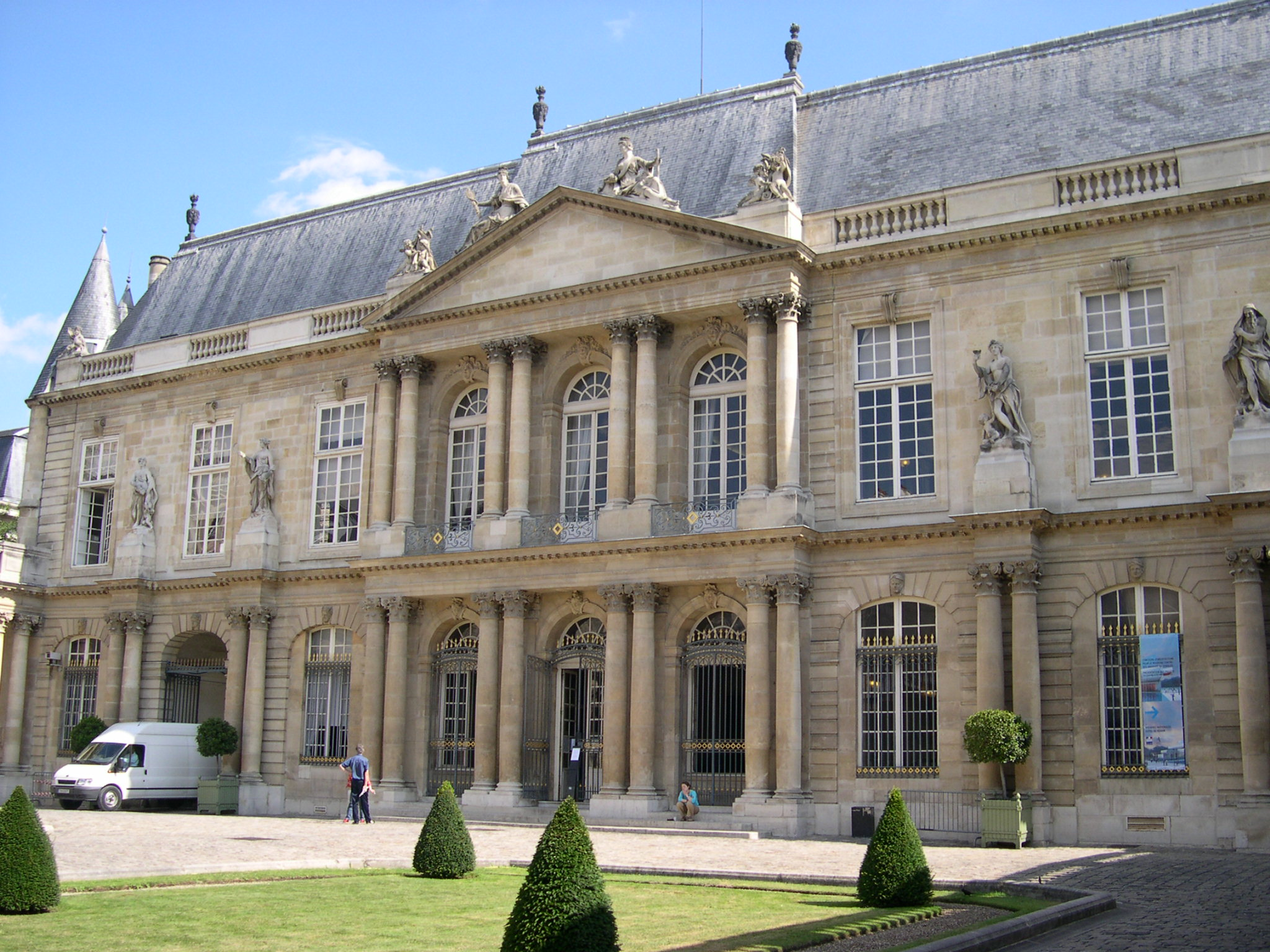
- Archives Nationales

- The administrative districts of the 3rd arrondissement
- Country: France
- Region: Île-de-France
- Ville: Paris
- Arrondissement: 3rd

Area
  - Total: 0.368 km^{2} (0.142 sq mi)

Population (2016)
  - Total: 8,176
  - Density: 22,217/km^{2} (57,540/sq mi)

The Quartier des Archives is an administrative district of Paris. Its name refers to the National Archives located to the west of the district.

== Location ==
the 11th administrative district of Paris, located in the 3rd arrondissement, in the Marais. Its name refers to the Archives Nationales housed in the Hôtel de Soubise and the Hôtel de Rohan, to the west of the district.

The Quartier des Archives is the 11th administrative district of Paris, located in the 3rd arrondissement, in the Marais. Its name refers to the Archives Nationales housed in the Hôtel de Soubise and the Hôtel de Rohan, to the west of the district.

The district is bordered:

- to the south by the Rue des Francs-Bourgeois and the Rue du Pas-de-la-Mule (border with the 4th arrondissement);
- to the east by the Boulevard Beaumarchais (border with the 11th arrondissement);
- to the north by the Rue Pastourelle, Rue de Poitou, and Rue du Pont-aux-Choux (border with the Quartier des Enfants-Rouges);
- to the west by the Rue des Archives (border with the Quartier Sainte-Avoye).

== Gallery ==
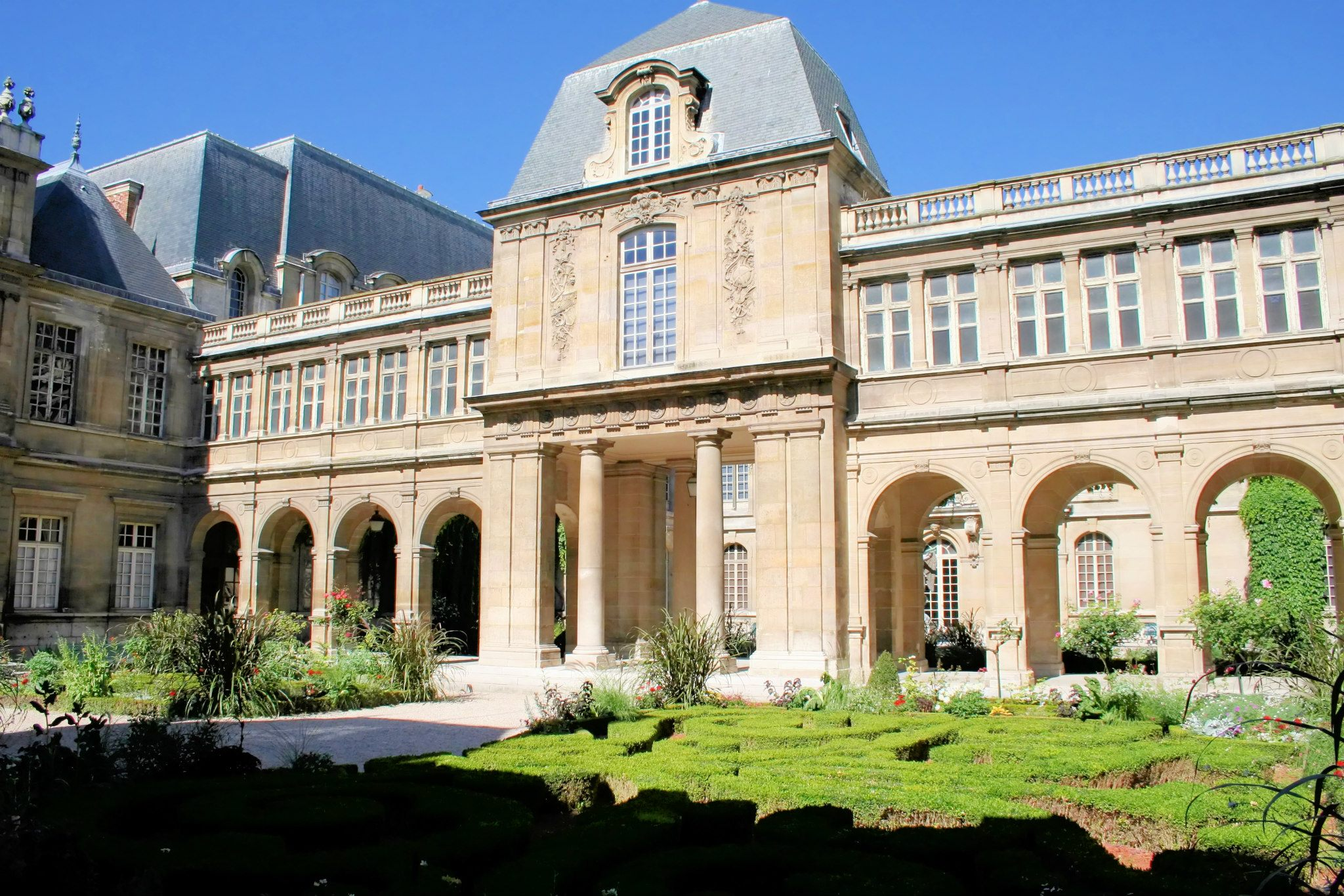
Musée Carnavalet, courtyard of the draper merchants.

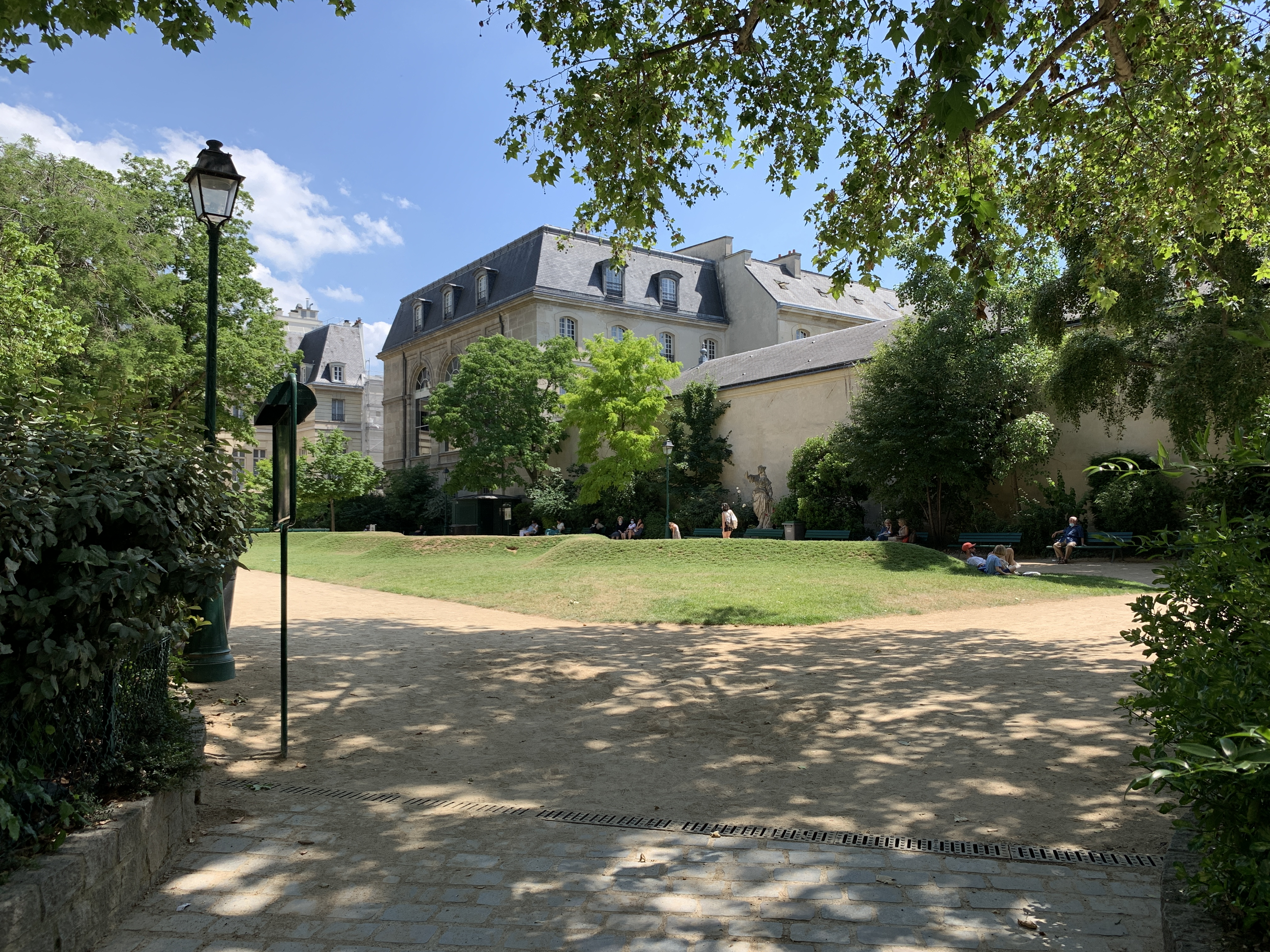
Square Léopold-Achille.
