= Rue Saint-Martin =

Street in Paris, France

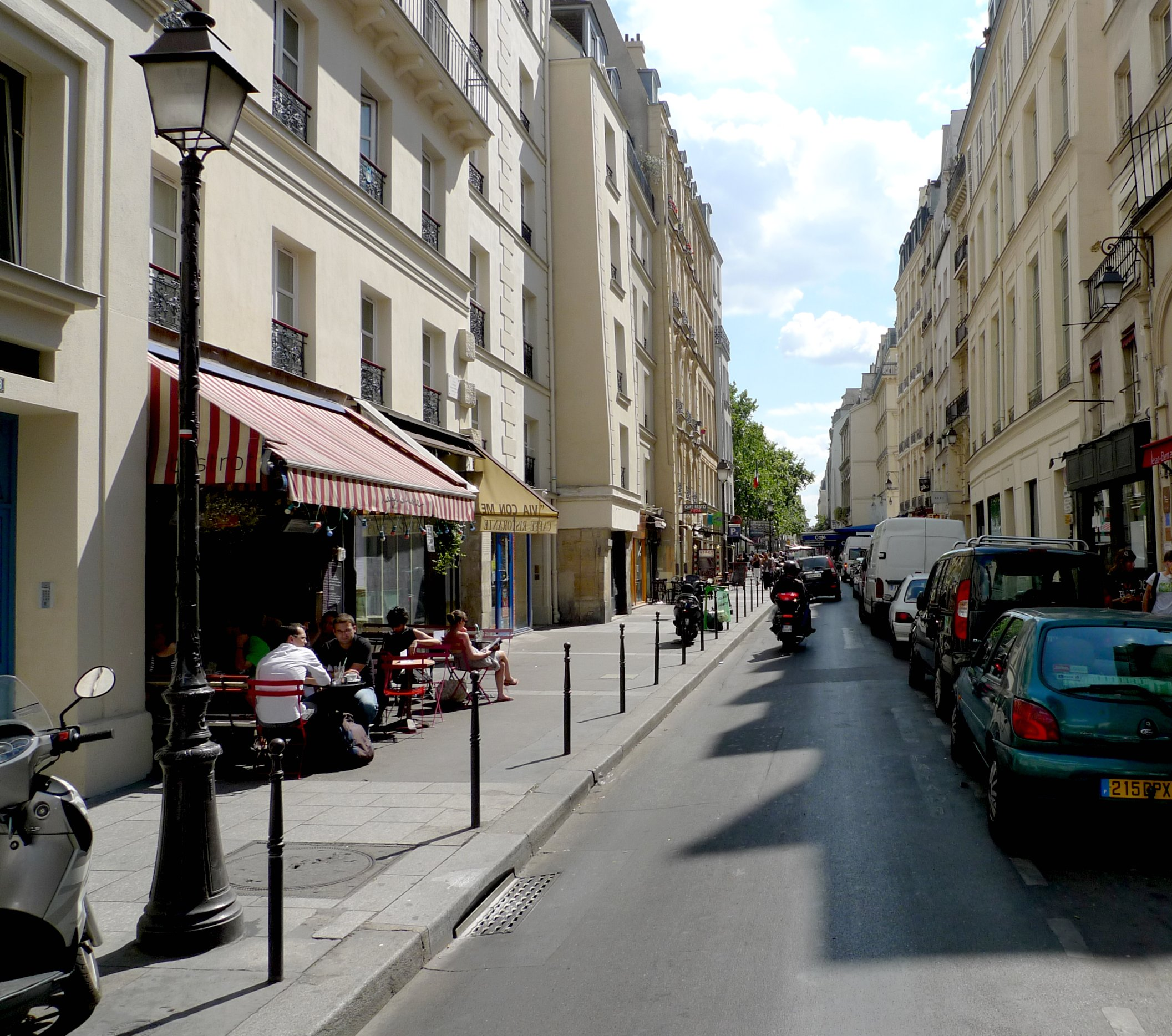
- Rue Saint-Martin in 2010

- Location within Paris
- Length: 1,420 m (4,660 ft)
- Width: 37 m (121 ft)
- Arrondissement: 3rd, 4th
- Quarter: Quartier des Arts-et-Métiers, Quartier Sainte-Avoye, Quartier Saint-Merri
- Coordinates: 48°51′45.5″N 2°21′8″E
- From: quai de Gesvres
- To: boulevard Saint-Denis, boulevard Saint-Martin

The Rue Saint-Martin is a street located in the 3rd and 4th arrondissements of Paris.

== Location ==
Currently, this 1,420-meter-long street spans the 3rd Arrondissement (comprising the Arts-et-Métiers and Sainte-Avoye districts) and the 4th Arrondissement (Saint-Merri district). It begins at 8–12 Quai de Gesvres and ends at 1 Boulevard Saint-Denis and 55 Boulevard Saint-Martin. Rue Saint-Martin continues northward beyond the Porte Saint-Martin as Rue du Faubourg-Saint-Martin. It is served by Metro Line 4 at the Châtelet, Les Halles, Étienne Marcel, Réaumur-Sébastopol, and Strasbourg-Saint-Denis stations.

== Origin of the name ==
It takes its name from the former Priory of Saint-Martin-des-Champs—now part of the Conservatoire national des arts et métiers (CNAM)—to which it leads.

== Bibliography ==
- Dictionnaire historique des rues de Paris.
- Félix et Louis Lazare, Dictionnaire administratif et historique des rues de Paris et de ses monuments.
- Henri Lemoine, La Rue Saint-Martin, des origines à nos jours, Mona Lisait, 1997, ISBN 2-912100-03-8.
- Jean de La Tynna, Dictionnaire topographique, étymologique et historique des rues de Paris, 1817.
