= Jardin Anne-Frank =

Garden in Paris, France

Coordinates: 48°51′41.959″N 2°21′18.192″E

Jardin Anne-Frank

The Jardin Anne-Frank is a green space in the Quartier Sainte-Avoye of the 3rd arrondissement of Paris, at 14, impasse Berthaud.

== Location and access ==
The site is accessible via 14 Impasse Berthaud.

It is served by metro line 11 at the Rambuteau station.

== Description ==
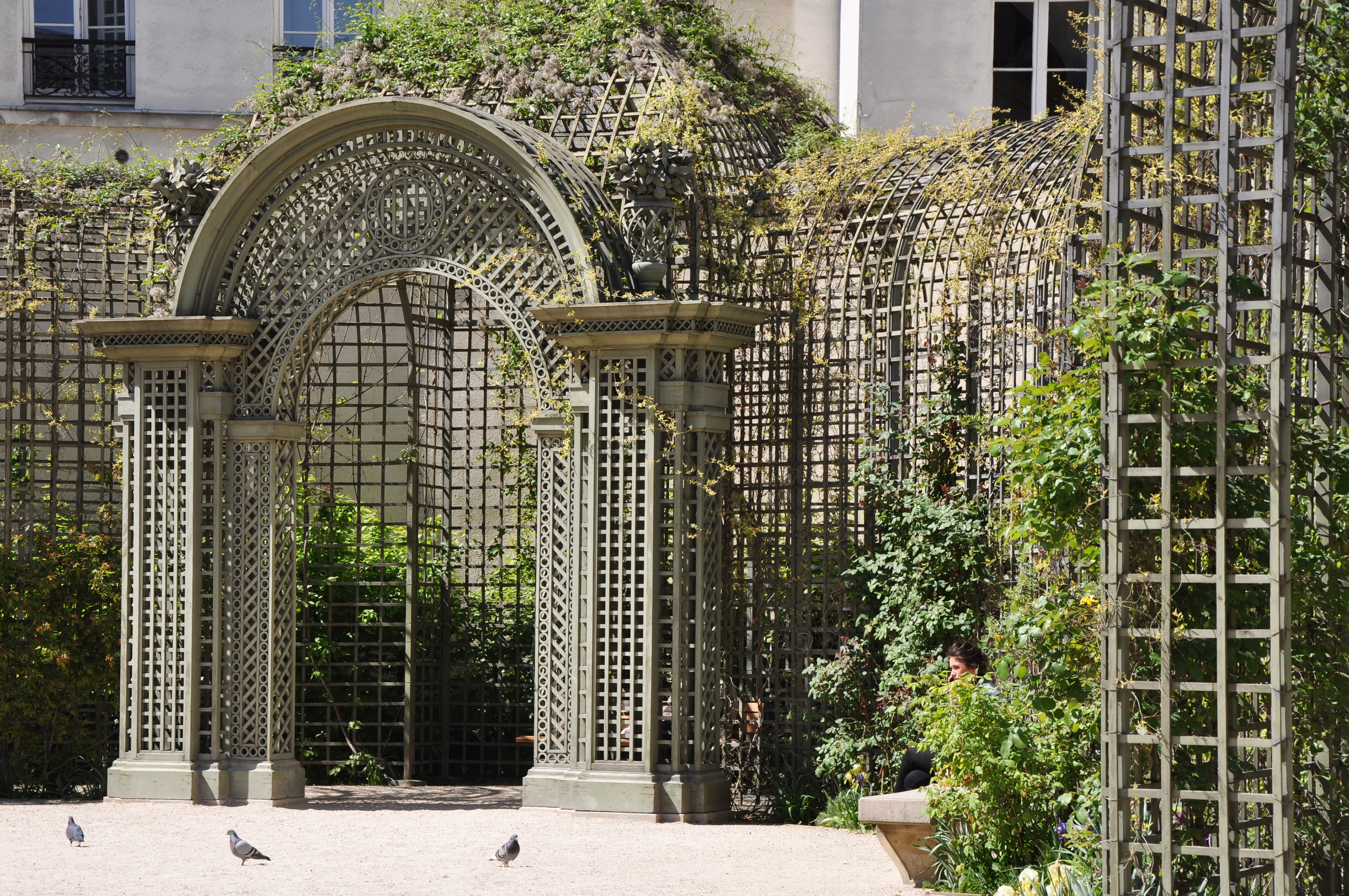
Garden trellis.

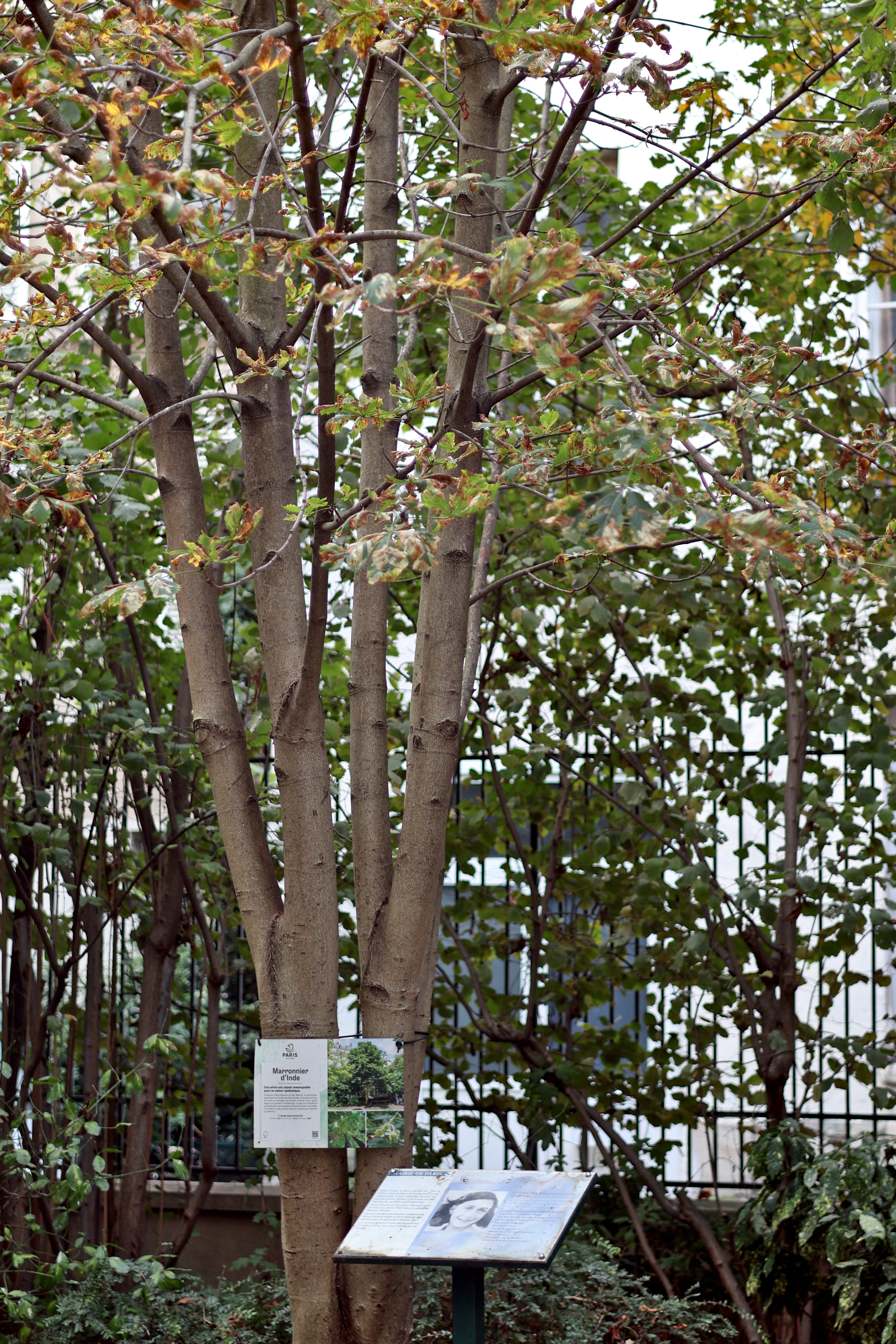
Horse chestnut tree, from the Anne Frank's horse chestnut tree in Amsterdam.

The inauguration ceremony, during which a sapling from Anne Frank's chestnut tree was planted, took place on June 20, 2007, in the presence of Bertrand Delanoë, Mayor of Paris, Pierre Aidenbaum, Mayor of the 3rd arrondissement, and Hans Westra, Director of the Anne Frank House in Amsterdam.

This garden covers 4,000 square meters in the former gardens of the Hôtel de Saint-Aignan, which now houses the Musée d'Art et d'Histoire du Judaïsme (entrance on Rue du Temple). It is the only municipal public garden in the Quartier Sainte-Avoye.

A group of sculptures in homage to Paul Celan, by Alexander Polzin, was installed at the garden's entrance in 2016.

== Origin of the name ==
This garden honors Annelies Marie Frank, better known as Anne Frank, who wrote a diary, The Diary of Anne Frank, while hiding with her family and four friends in Amsterdam during the German occupation in World War II in an attempt to escape the Holocaust.
