= Rue de Montmorency =

Street in Paris, France

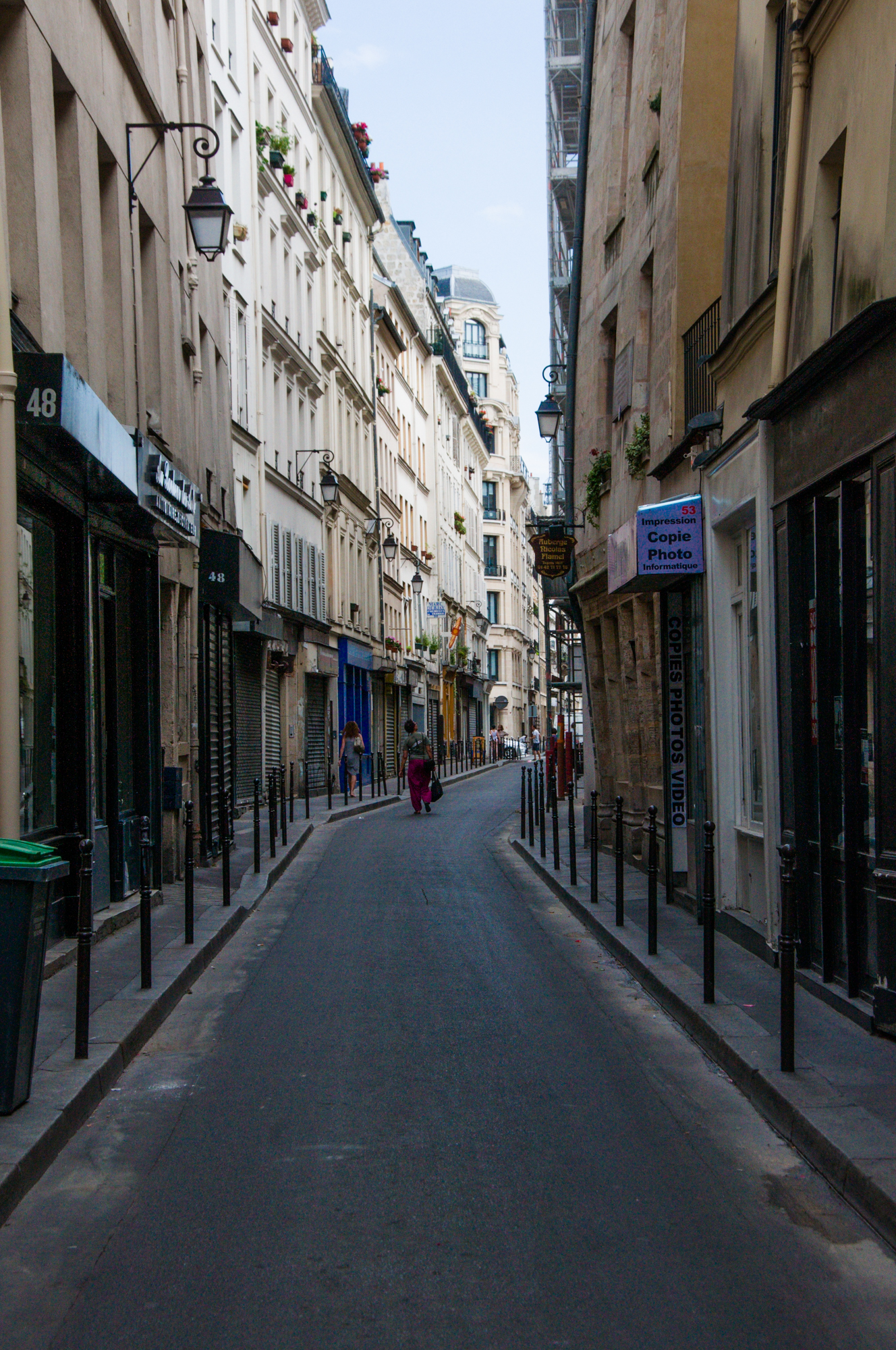
- Rue de Montmorency

- Location within Paris
- Coordinates: 48°51′45.8″N 2°21′22.97″E
- From: rue du Temple
- To: 212 rue Saint-Martin

The Rue de Montmorency is a street in the historic Le Marais quarter of Paris, part of the city's 3rd arrondissement. It runs from the Rue du Temple to the Rue Saint-Martin.

== History ==
The street was named in 1768 after the Montmorency family, prominent residents of Le Marais during the Renaissance period. The Montmorency family is one of the oldest and most distinguished families in France, derived from the city of Montmorency, now in the Val-d'Oise département, about 9 miles (15 km) northwest of Paris. As the Montmorency was a noble family, the street lost its name at the French Revolution. Therefore, it was known between the end of the French Revolution and 1806 as the Rue de la Réunion.

== Notable buildings ==
The Rue de Montmorency is fairly representative of the ancient streets of the heart of Paris.

- No. 5, stood a mansion where Mary Magdalene of Castile and Nicolas Fouquet lived from 1651 to 1658. She brought a dowry to this vast parish located in Saint-Nicolas-des-Champs, at the corner of future streets Michel-le-Comte, the Temple, and Montmorency. The mansion belonged until 1624 to the Montmorency family. Nicolas Fouquet was nominated Superintendent of Finance by Anne of Austria in 1653. Théophile de Viau also lived there. A neoclassical fountain is still visible in the garden of the current Hôtel Thiroux Lailly.
- No. 6, porch Louis Philippe. From 1966 to 2006, the Morder family (Bernard and Hela) and their two sons (Joseph and Robi) lived there. Joseph Morder became a film director and is considered the "Pope of the Super 8". From 2000 to 2005, the Iranian painter Zohreh Eskandari lived and worked there, as well as the singer Lio.
- No. 8, Madame de Sévigné lived from 1676 to 1677.
- No. 10 stood a print shop, La ruche ouvrière (The working hive), founded after the Second World War by Yervant Aprahamiantz, who had close relationship with European libertarian scene, more particularly with Nestor Makhno and Volin. This print shop that he managed took the form of a workers' cooperative. Many leaflets, posters, newspapers, pamphlets and books published by French, Bulgarian and Spanish libertarians were printed there. A fire destroyed the building in 1980, which was subsequently rebuilt.
- No. 44, Henry Segal lived there. He died in Slovakia on August 9, 1948, close to village Kozelnik working as volunteer on the Youth Railway Construction Project.
- No. 51, stands the house of Nicolas Flamel.

=== House of Nicolas Flamel ===
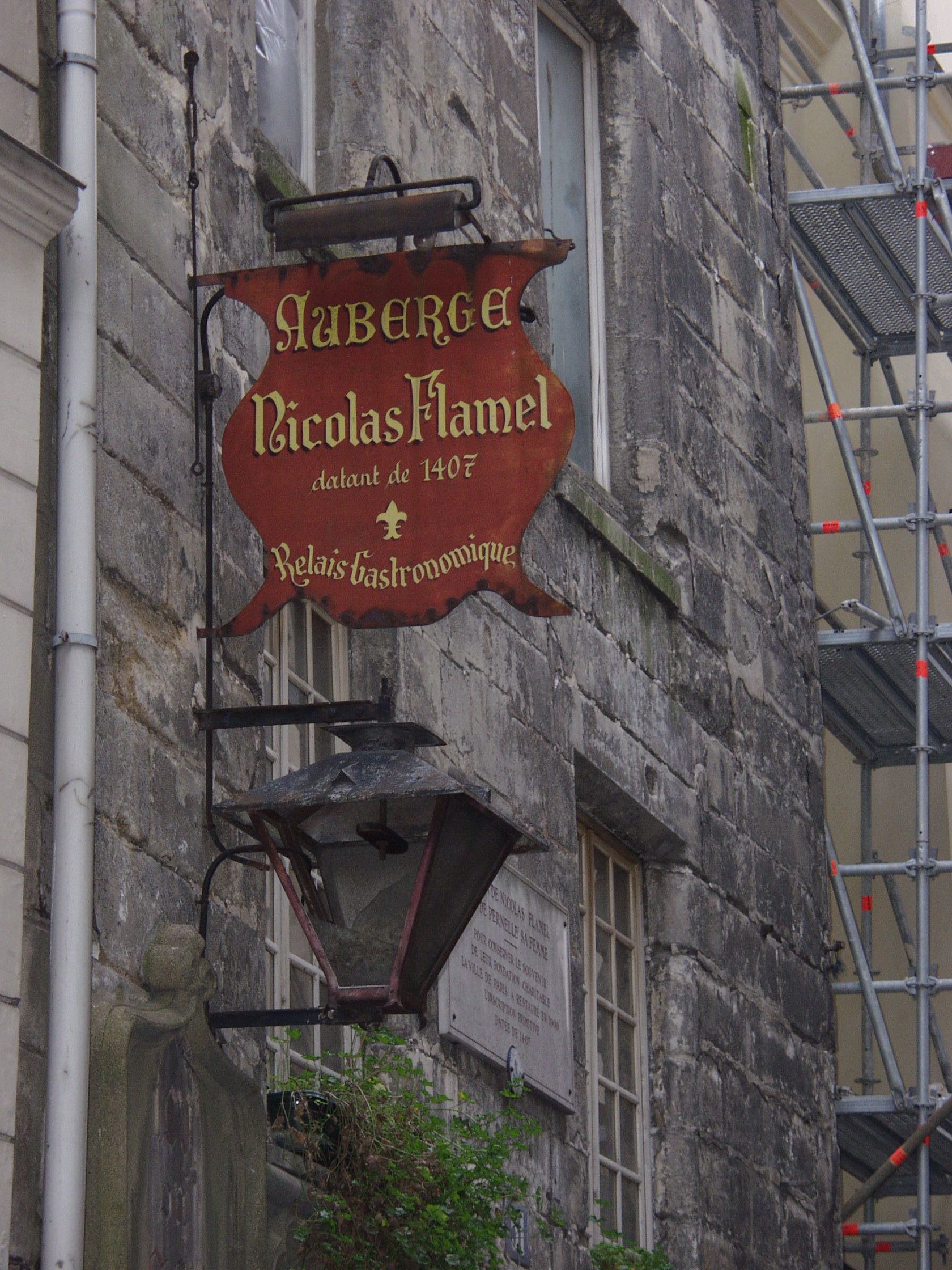
Auberge Nicolas Flamel, the oldest stone house in Paris, at 52 rue de Montmorency

The house of Nicolas Flamel, at no. 52, which was built in 1407 by Flamel himself, still stands, the oldest stone house in Paris, at 51 rue de Montmorency; the ground floor, always a tavern, currently houses the Auberge Nicolas Flamel. Nicolas Flamel, a scrivener and manuscript-seller who developed a reputation as an alchemist, claimed that he made the philosopher's stone, which turned lead into gold, and that he and his wife Pernelle achieved immortality. Engraved images were discovered during recent works on this house.

On the facade of the building one can still read this inscription: "Nous homes et femes laboureurs demourans ou porche de ceste maison qui fut faite en l'an de grâce mil quatre cens et sept somes tenus chascun en droit soy dire tous les jours une paternostre et un ave maria en priant Dieu que sa grâce face pardon aus povres pescheurs trespasses Amen".

This religious foundation included a gable wall, which has since disappeared. The first two floors remain and still retain their original decoration: the famous Gothic inscription mentioned above, as well as the pillars of the base moldings and decorations of angels and columns. On the second and fifth pillars are engraved with the initials "NF" in homage to the founder of the place. This decoration appears to be the work of a funerary engraver from the neighboring cemetery of Saint-Nicolas des Champs.

This house has been the subject of new restorations in June 2007 and is now a restaurant.

== Geographic situation ==
The street is close to the Conservatoire National des Arts et Métiers, housed in the medieval priory of Saint-Martin-des-Champs. It is also located very close to the Centre Georges Pompidou (also named Beaubourg Museum). Numerous modern art galleries can be found on the Rue de Montmorency.

== Trivia ==
The novel Rhum from the French writer Blaise Cendrars takes place in a brick foundry located at 14 rue de Montmorency.

== Places and monuments ==
- Place des Vosges
- Musée Picasso
- Centre Georges Pompidou
- Nicolas Flamel
- Conservatoire National des Arts et Métiers
