= Le Défenseur du Temps =

Work of art in France

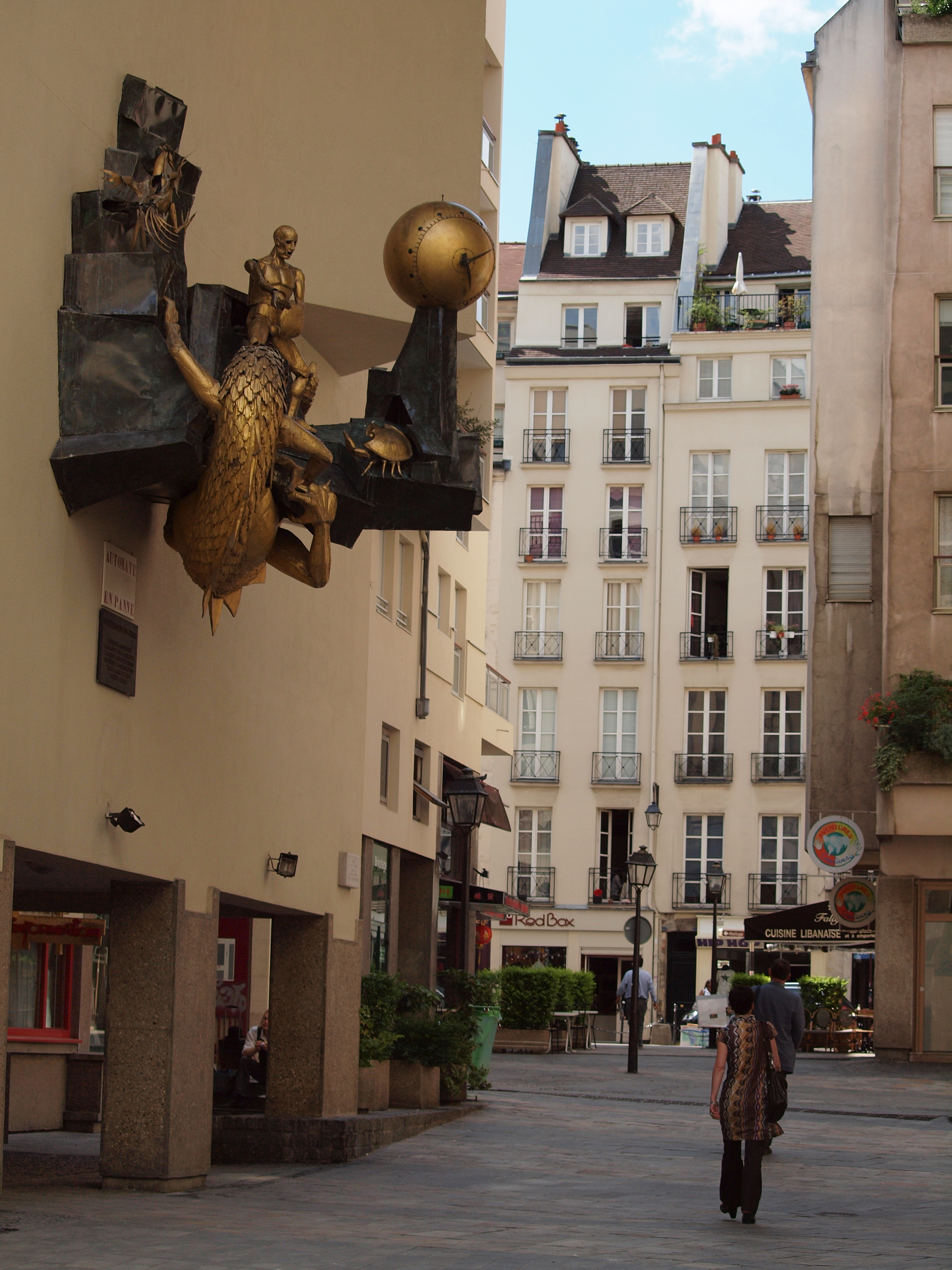
- Artist: Jacques Monestier
- Year: 1979
- Type: steel; brass
- Dimensions: 400 cm (160 in)
- Location: Paris, France; 48°51′44.89″N 2°21′9.38″E

Le Défenseur du Temps ('The Defender of Time') is a large mechanical work of art in the form of a clock created by the French artist Jacques Monestier.

== Description ==
Le Défenseur du temps is a clock made of automata. Close to the dial, a man perched on a rock with a sword and shield fights against a bird, a dragon, and a crab which respectively represent air, earth, and water. As originally designed, every hour from 9 am to 10 pm, he fights one of the three animals chosen randomly by a program. At noon, 6 pm, and 10pm, all three animals attack at the same time.

The time is announced by three strokes. While the man fights, he is accompanied by sounds of breaking waves, rumbling earth or the sound of wind, depending on the animal chosen.

Le Défenseur du temps is 4 meters high and weighs about 1 ton. The characters, animals and the clock face are hammered brass and gold leaf. The rock on which they sit is composed of oxidized brass. In its original configuration, a master electronic quartz circuit board controlled the random attacks chance, and used six cam timers and five tape recorders.

== Location ==
Le Défenseur du temps is located at 8 rue Bernard de Clairvaux, in the Quartier de l'Horloge in Paris's 3rd arrondissement. The area around the clock owes its name to this work.

== History ==
Le Défenseur du temps was commissioned in 1975 by COGEDIM. The scales of the dragon were made by Louis Desouches, and the construction of the steel structure was by Alain Moirod.

The clock was partially installed in September 1979. It was formally dedicated on 8 October 1979 by the Mayor of Paris, Jacques Chirac.

The clock underwent restoration in 1995. The master clock's quartz crystal was replaced by a radio clock, and the tape recorders were replaced by a compact disc player. Without funding for maintenance, the clock was stopped on July 1, 2003.

Under the direction of artist Cyprien Gaillard, the clock was taken down in February 2022 and renovated by the company Prêtre et Fils. In September 2022, it was installed at the Fondation Lafayette Anticipations as a part of Gaillard's two-site exhibition Humpty/Dumpty. Since the end of the exhibition in January 2023, Le Défenseur du Temps has returned to its original location and its initial settings as imagined by Jacques Monestier. It was reinstalled and restarted on February 6, 2023.
