= Quartier des Arts-et-Métiers =

Parisian administrative district

Coordinates: 48°51′58.68″N 2°21′24.66″E

- Neighborhood
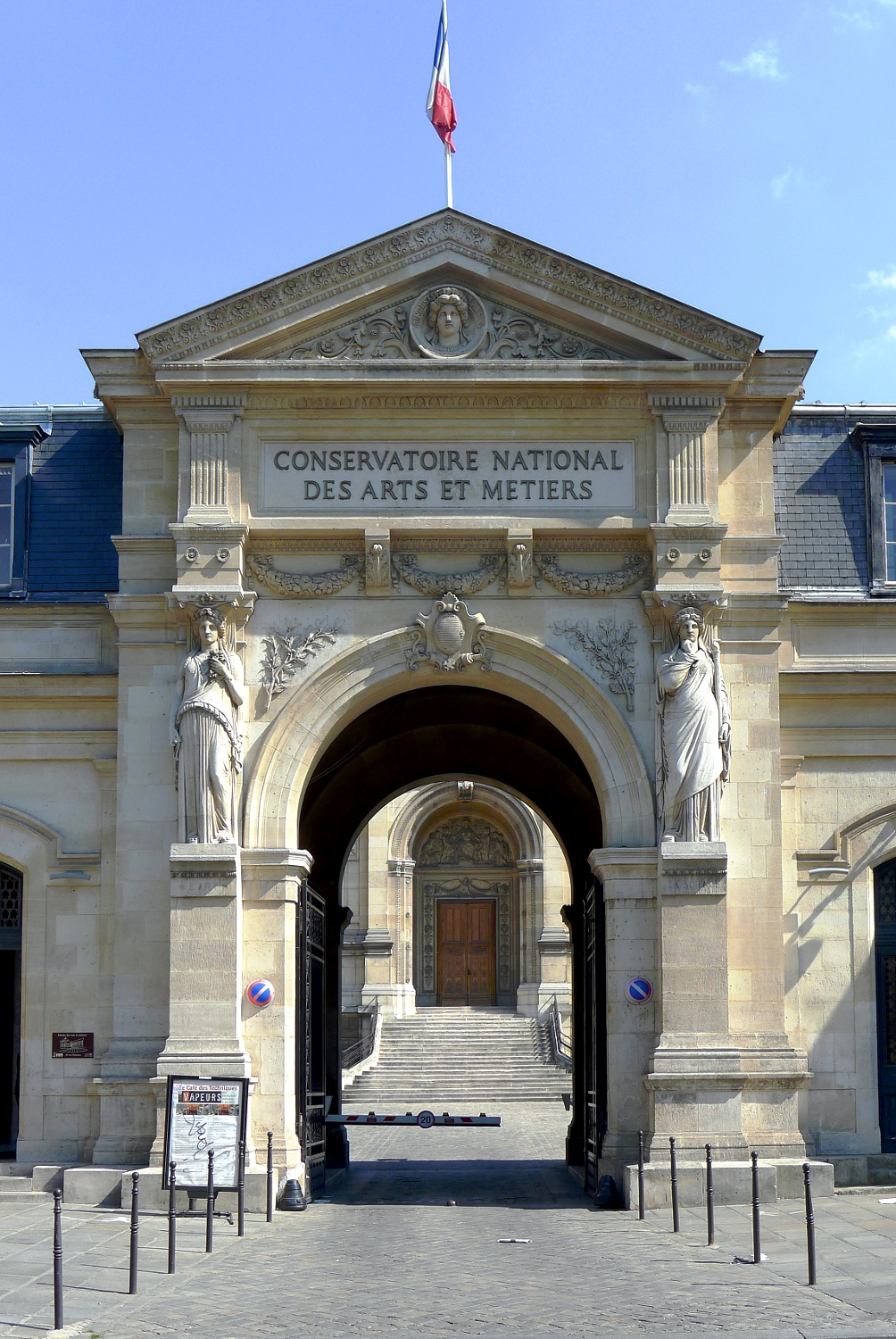
- Conservatoire national des arts et métiers

- Location within the 3r arrondissement.
- Country: France
- Region: Île-de-France
- City: Paris
- Arrondissement: 3r

Area
  - Total: 0,318 km^{2} (123 sq mi)

Population (2016)
  - Total: 9,722
  - Density: 30.6/km^{2} (79.2/sq mi)

The Quartier des Arts-et-Métiers is the 9th administrative district of Paris, located in the 3rd arrondissement.

It takes its name from the Conservatoire national des arts et métiers, which is located in the area and is sometimes nicknamed "Arzème".

== Delimitation ==
To the north, forming the limit with the 10th arrondissement, the part of Boulevard Saint-Denis between Boulevard de Sébastopol and Rue Saint-Martin, Boulevard Saint-Martin and the southwest part of Place de la République; to the east, forming the limit with the Enfants-Rouges district, rue du Temple; to the south forming the limit with the Sainte-Avoye district, rue des Gravilliers and the part of rue Turbigo between rue Saint-Martin and Boulevard de Sébastopol and to the west, at the edge of the 2nd arrondissement, Boulevard de Sébastopol.

== History ==
Most of its territory—with the exception of the area between Rue Saint-Martin and Boulevard de Sébastopol—corresponds to the northern section of the Saint-Martin-des-Champs Abbey estate, which was developed in the early 13th century to create the Saint-Martin-des-Champs district.

Part of the neighborhood is Paris's oldest Asian district.

The administrative districts of the 3rd arrondissement.

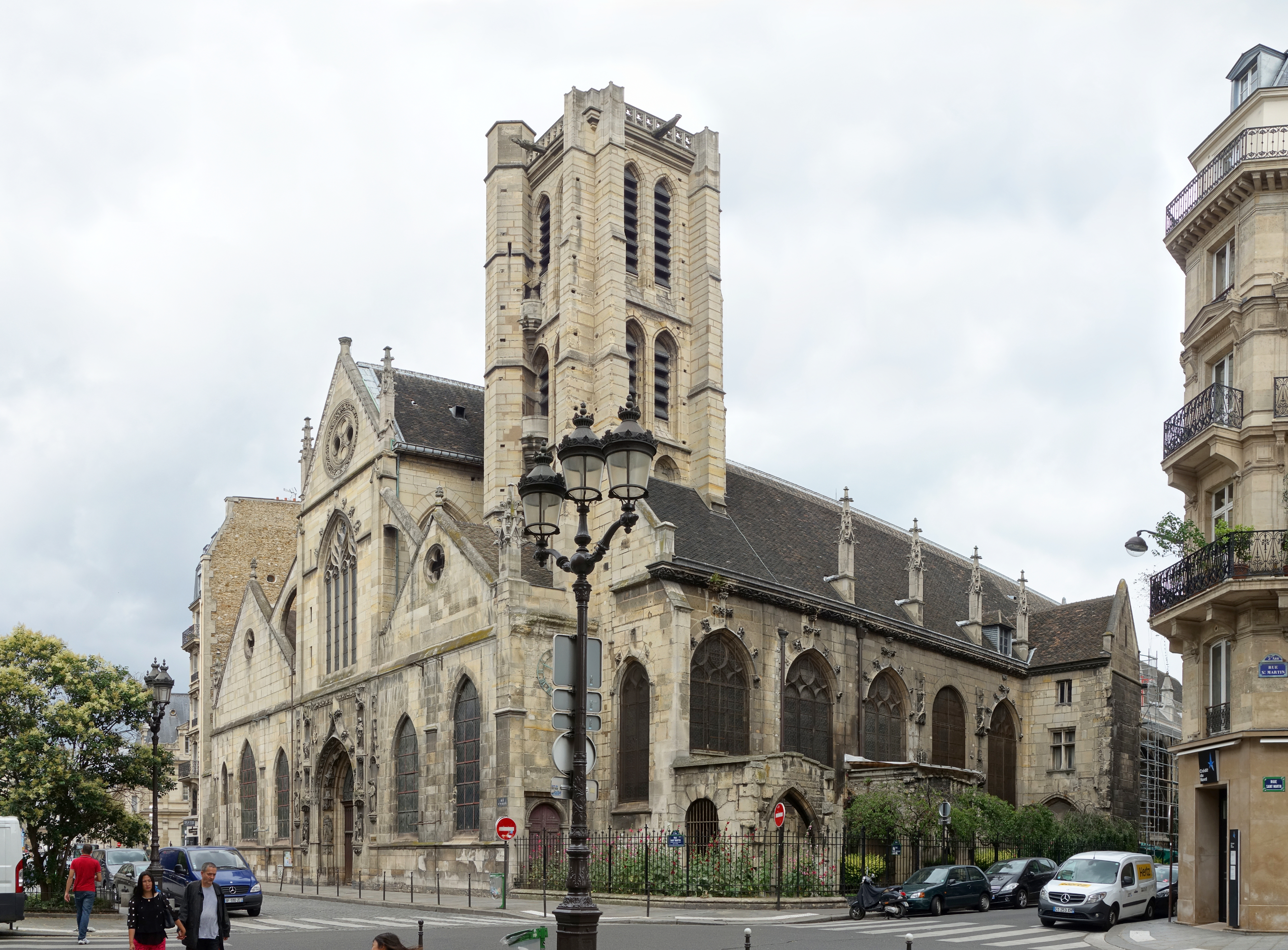
Saint-Nicolas-des-Champs, Paris.

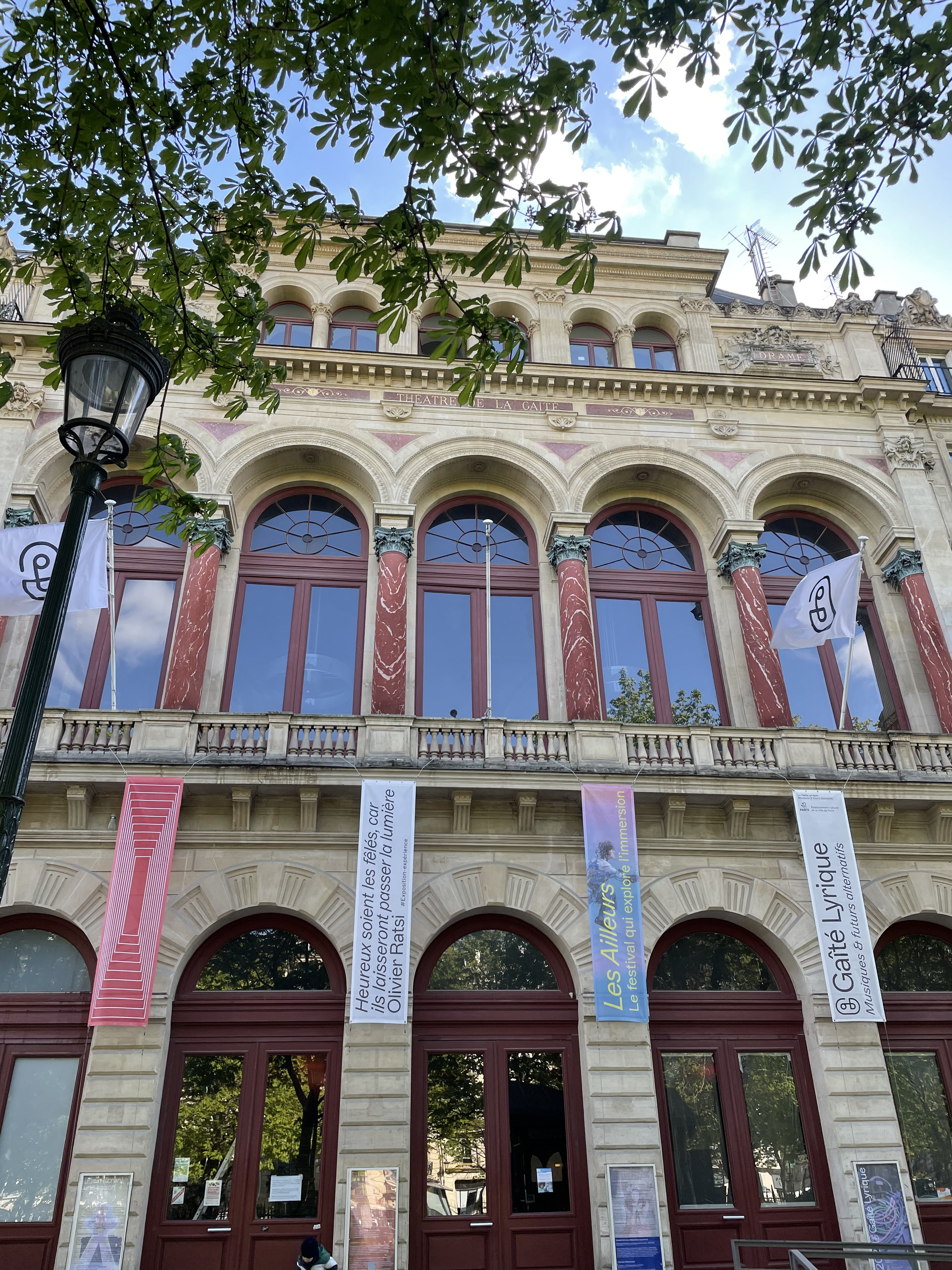
La Gaîté Lyrique, a City of Paris cultural institution dedicated to digital arts and contemporary music.

== Places ==
- The Conservatoire national des arts et métiers
- The Church of Saint-Nicolas-des-Champs
- The Church of Sainte-Élisabeth-de-Hongrie
- La Gaîté Lyrique
- Général-Morin Square
- Émile-Chautemps Square
