= Musée de la Poupée =

Defunct museum in Paris, France

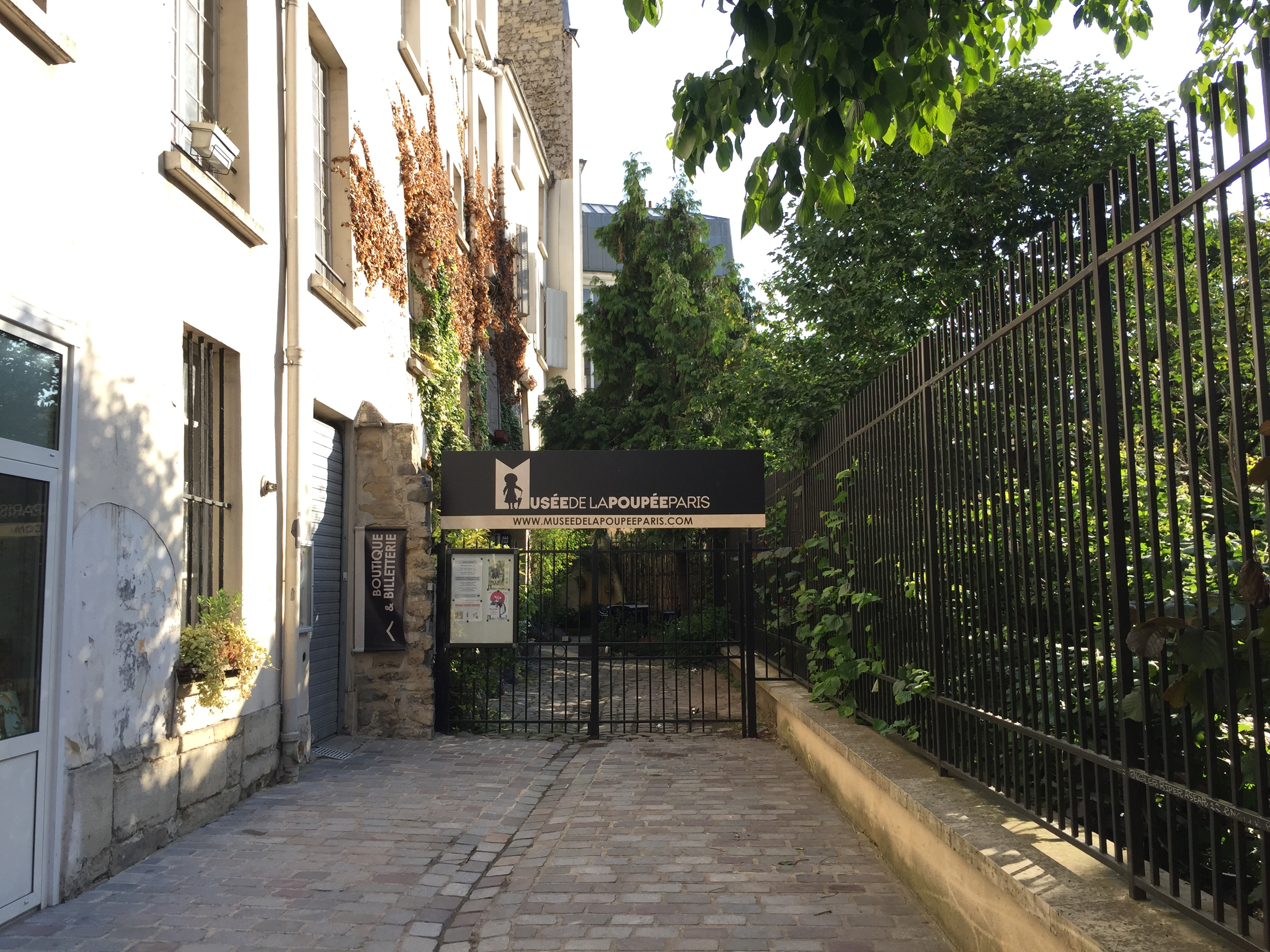
- Museum entrance
- Established: 1994
- Dissolved: September 2017
- Location: 3rd arrondissement of Paris, France
- Coordinates: 48.8616°N 2.3543°E

The Musée de la Poupée (French pronunciation: [myze də la pupe]) was a private doll museum located in the 3rd arrondissement at Impasse Berthaud, near 22 rue Beaubourg, Paris, France.

The museum was established in 1994, and closed in September 2017. It contained a permanent collection of more than 500 French dolls. Dolls were arranged chronologically from about 1800 to the present, and feature construction of bisque, composition, cloth, rubber, celluloid, and plastic. Exhibits were displayed with scale-model furniture, accessories, and toys from the appropriate periods. One room focused on doll-making and the materials used in dolls. The museum also presented temporary exhibits and lectures.

== See also ==
- List of museums in Paris

== Sources ==
- Musée de la Poupée
- Paris.org entry
- Pariserve article (French)
