= Rue Pastourelle =

Street in Paris, France

Coordinates: 48°51′46″N 2°21′33″E

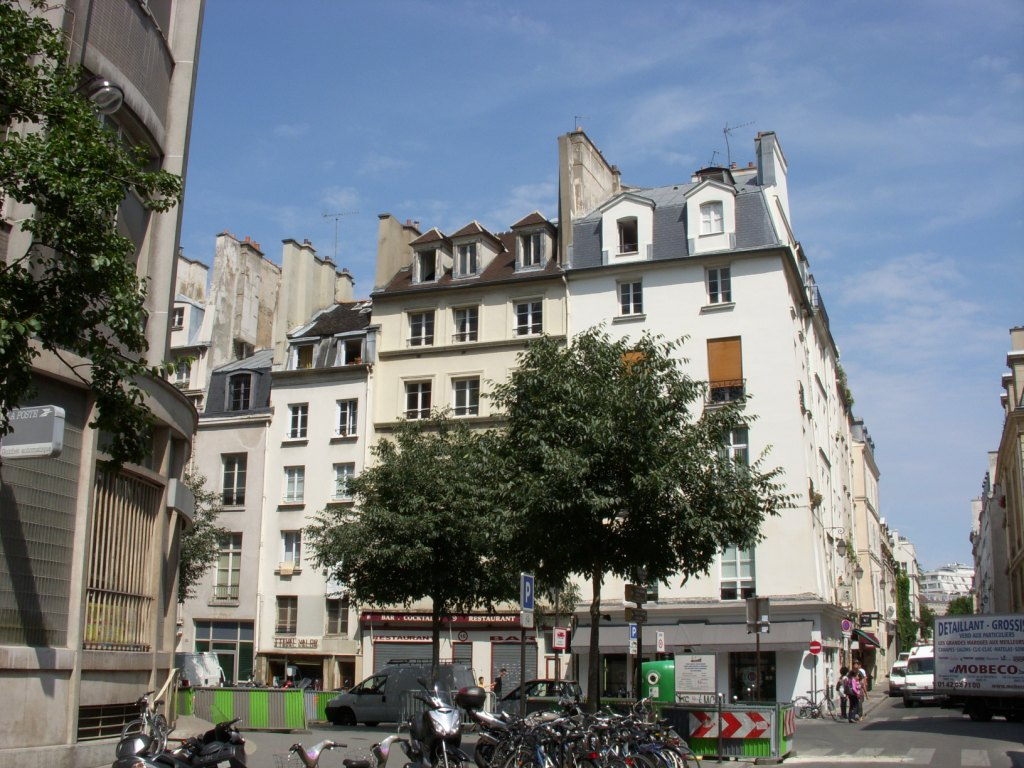
Rue Pastourelle in Paris

The Rue Pastourelle (French pronunciation: [ʁy pastuʁɛl]) is a street in the 3rd arrondissement of Paris.

It starts at the Rue Charlot and ends at the Boulevard du Temple. Its nearest metro stations are Arts et Métiers and Saint-Sébastien - Froissart.

The street is named for Roger Pastourelle who lived there in 1378 when he was a member of the French parliament.
