= Quartier des Enfants-Rouges =

Administrative district of Paris

Coordinates: 48.864241°N 2.3625872°E

Enfants-Rouges
- Quartier des Enfants-Rouges
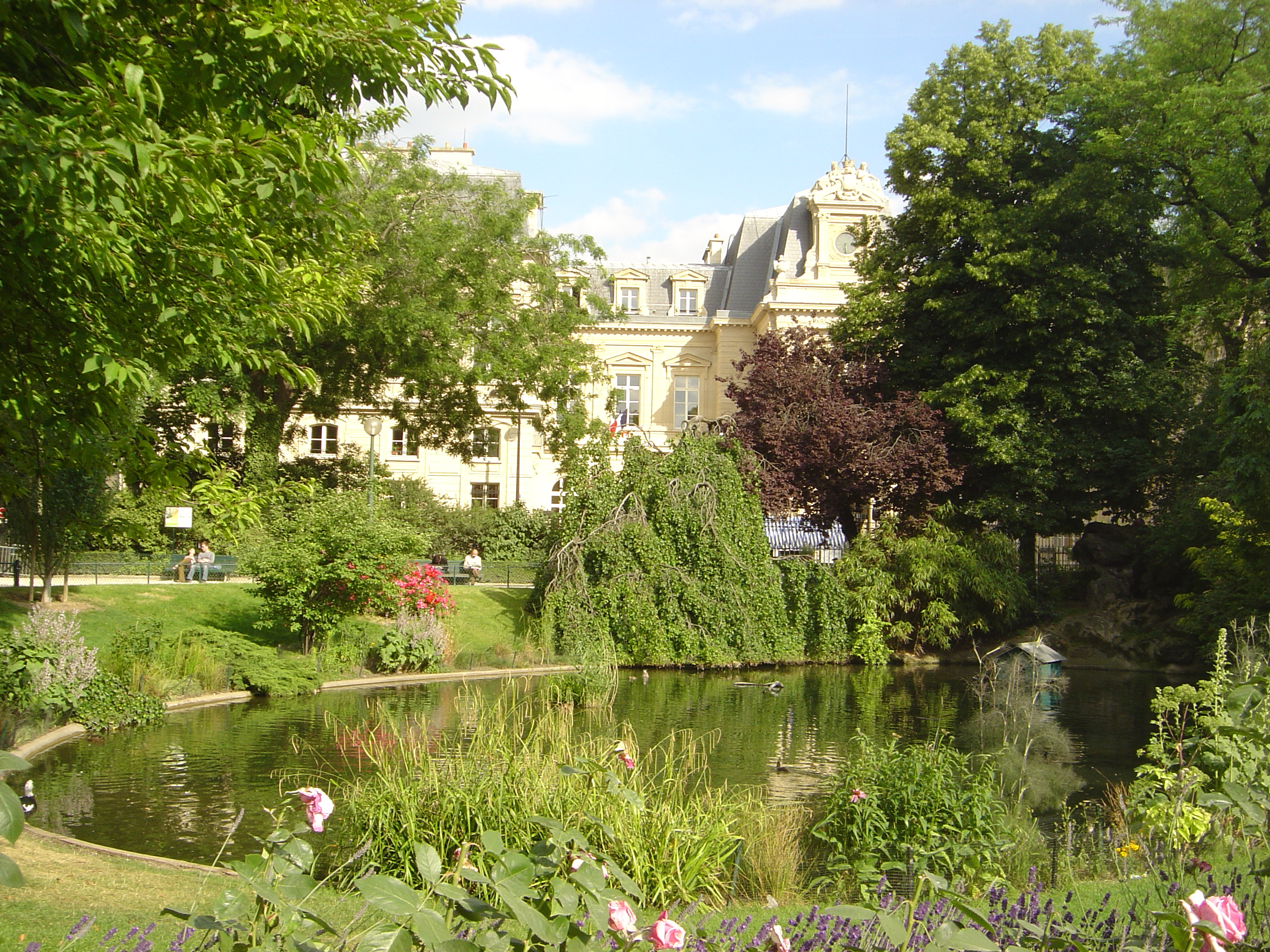
- Square du Temple – Elie-Wiesel
- Interactive map of Enfants-Rouges
- Country: France
- Region: Île-de-France
- Ville: Paris
- Arrondissement: 3rd

Area
  - Total: 0.272 km^{2} (0.105 sq mi)

Population (2016)
  - Total: 8,996
  - Density: 33,074/km^{2} (85,660/sq mi)

The Quartier des Enfants-Rouges is the 10th administrative district of Paris located in the 3rd arrondissement.

== History ==
The district corresponds to the former Temple district as it was delimited from 1702 to 1789, and then to the southern part of this district, which extended north of Boulevard du Temple from 1795 to 1859.

Its territory includes:

- in the northwest, the land of the former Temple enclosure, roughly within the quadrilateral bounded by Rue du Temple, Rue Béranger, Rue de Picardie, and Rue de Bretagne, subdivided during the First Empire.
- at its northwestern edge, a portion of the former Temple seam, developed at the end of the 17th century with the opening of what is now Rue de Vendôme (Rue Béranger).
- in the southeast, the Provinces of France district, created at the beginning of the 17th century at the initiative of King Henry IV on land ceded in 1608 by the Grand Prior of the Temple.
- South of the former Temple enclosure lies the northern part of the Ville-Neuve du Temple, a subdivision of the Templar domain in the late 13th and 14th centuries.

This district takes its name from the Hospice des Enfants-Rouges (Hospice of the Red Children), founded by Marguerite de Valois-Angoulême, sister of Francis I, in the 16th century. In 1536, Marguerite de Valois decided to create a hospital-orphanage to receive "orphans found at the Hôtel-Dieu in Paris." Contrary to a sometimes-printed legend, the orphans of this institution were not dressed in red—carmine dye made from cochineal being prohibitively expensive—but took the name "red children" because they shared the common experience of having killed their mothers in childbirth.

Located on the site of the Rue du Grand-Chantier (now part of the Rue des Archives), this institution closed its doors in 1772, and the orphans were transferred to the Foundling Hospital on the Île de la Cité. In memory of this hospital-orphanage, the nearby Marais du Temple market became the Marché des Enfants Rouges (Market of the Red Children) at the end of the 18th century, which would later give its name to this district in the 3rd arrondissement.

== Description ==
The administrative districts of the 3rd arrondissement.

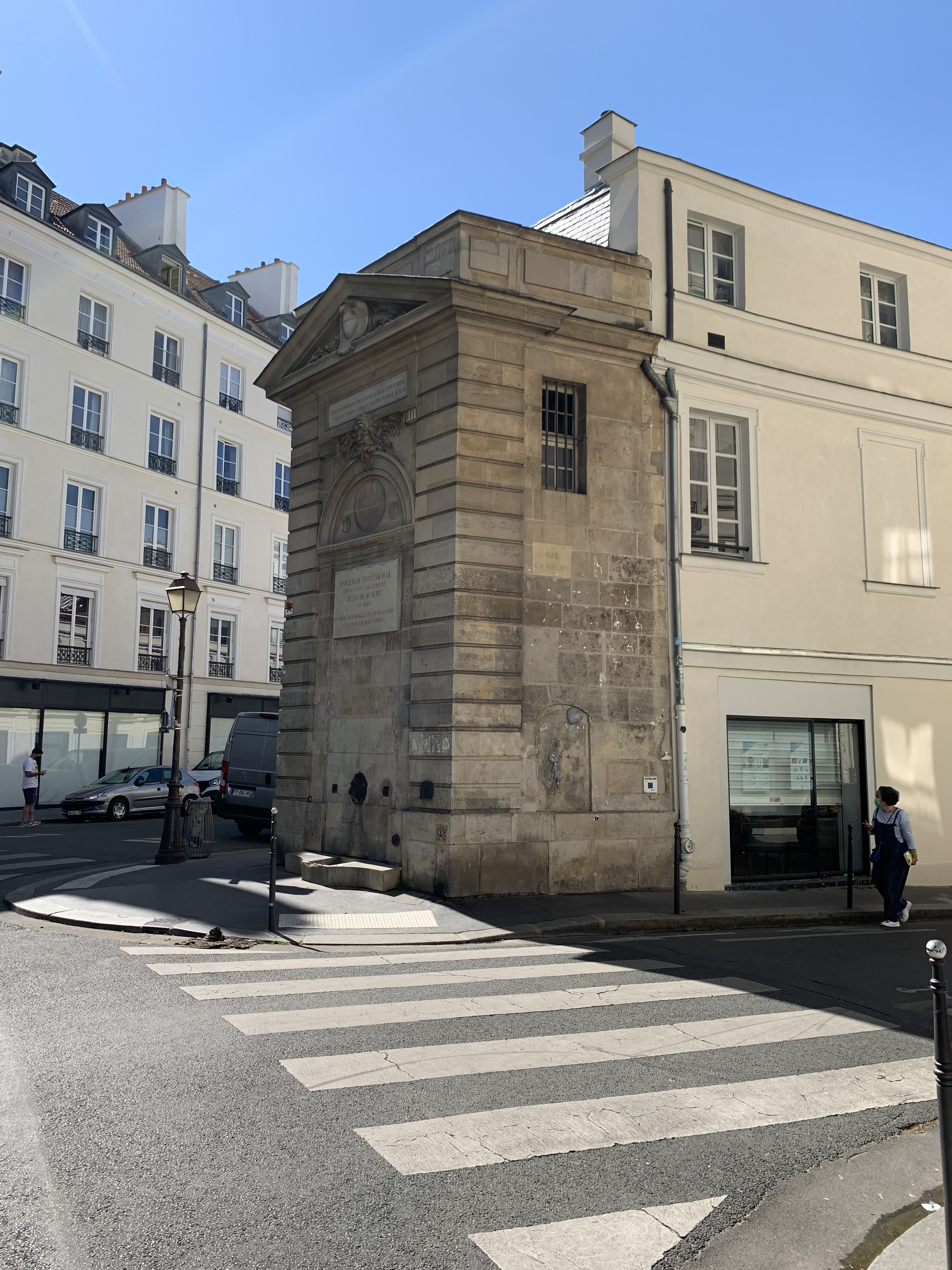
Boucherat fountain, by Jean Beausire, in homage to Louis Boucherat, between Turenne and Charlot streets.

The district is bordered:

- to the west, by Rue du Temple (bordering the Quartier des Arts-et-Métiers);
- to the south, by Rue Pastourelle, Rue du Poitou, and Rue du Pont-aux-Choux (bordering the Quartier des Archives);
- to the east, by Boulevard des Filles-du-Calvaire and Boulevard du Temple (bordering the Saint-Ambroise and Folie-Méricourt districts of the 11th arrondissement);
- to the north, by Place de la République (bordering the Folie-Méricourt district of the 11th arrondissement and the Porte Saint-Martin district of the 10th arrondissement).
