= Saint-Martin-des-Champs, Paris =

Church in Paris, France

Coordinates: 48°52′12″N 2°21′47″E

Saint-Martin des Champs
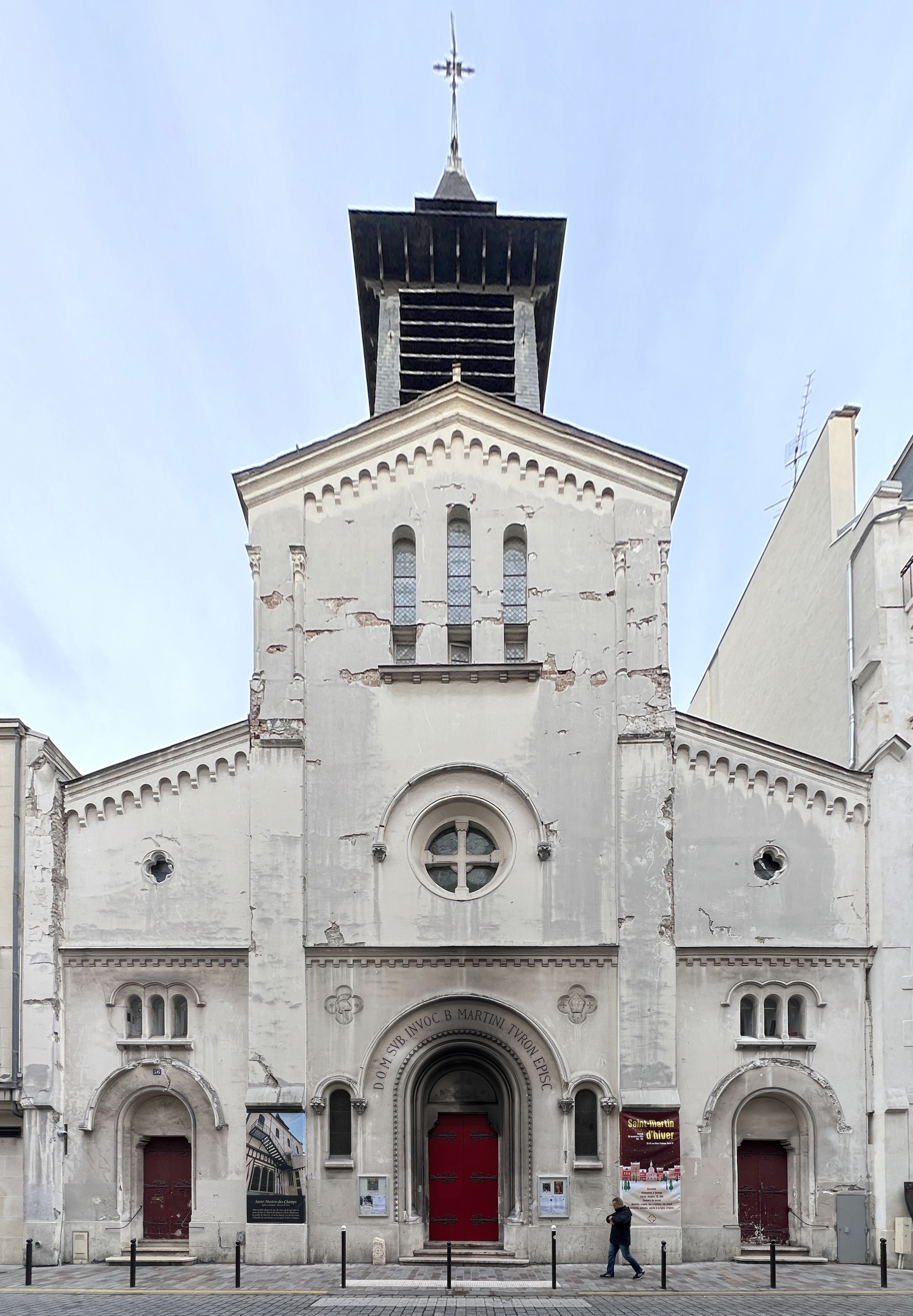
- Saint-Martin-des-Champs

Religion
- Affiliation: Catholic Church
- Province: Archdiocese of Paris
- Rite: Roman Rite

Location
- Location: 136 rue Albert Thomas, 10th arrondissement of Paris
- Interactive map of Saint-Martin des Champs

Architecture
- Architect: Paul Gallois
- Style: Neo-Romanesque
- Groundbreaking: 1854
- Completed: 1856

Saint-Martin-des-Champs is a Roman Catholic Church located at 36 rue Albert-Thomas in the 10th arrondissement of Paris. It was built during the French Second Empire of Louis-Napoleon between 1854 and 1856, a blend of Romanesque architecture and Byzantine architecture, which was very popular in the period. It shares the same name with several other historic Paris churches, most notably the Saint-Martin-des-Champs Priory, whose former building is now part of the French National Conservatory of Arts and Crafts.

== History ==
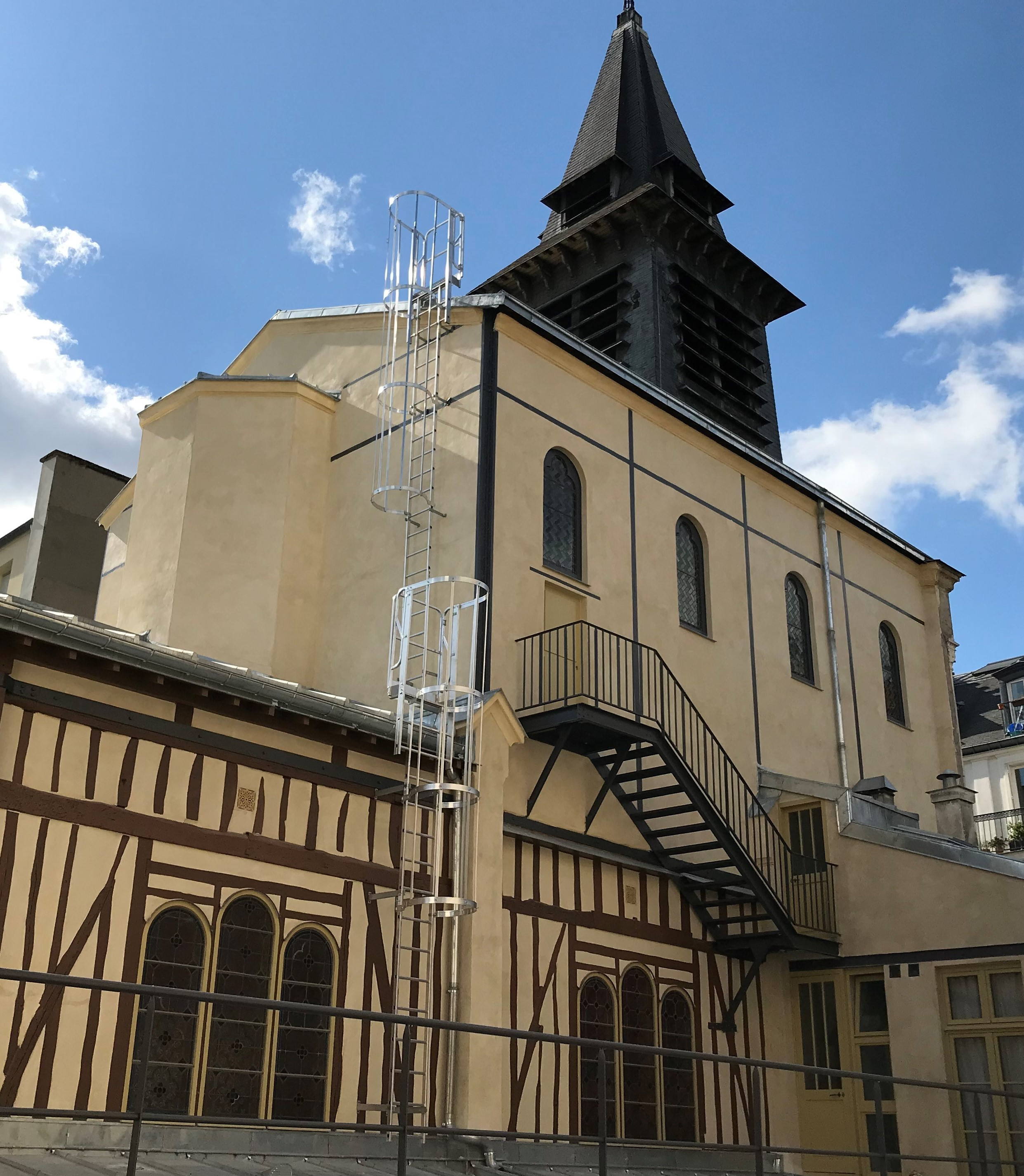
The early lower church was built with wooden beams, the upper part with iron beams

In August 1854, in conjunction with the program of Emperor Louis Napoleon to create new avenues and rebuild the city neighbourhoods, the Archbishop of Paris, Marie Dominique Auguste Sibour, commissioned a new church. The parish lies along the Canal Saint-Martin. It was financed with contributions from the neighbourhood parishioners. Abbot Bruyere was responsible for its construction, hiring the architect Paul Gallais, who had established his reputation building new hospices in the city.

It was originally intended to be a temporary building until larger church was built, and thus had a limited budget. He built it upon a wooden frame, which was economical, but it restricted the site; French laws directed that timber buildings could not be placed on major boulevards, in order to prevent the spread of fires; it had to be surrounded by other buildings.

The wooden beams were covered with stucco to give it a classical appearance, to match the interior. In later construction, iron beams replaced the wooden beams. The church was inaugurated on 31 January 1856 and officially established as a promoted to the church of the parish in April. The bell tower, designed by Fernand Vaudry, was added later in 1933.

== Interior ==
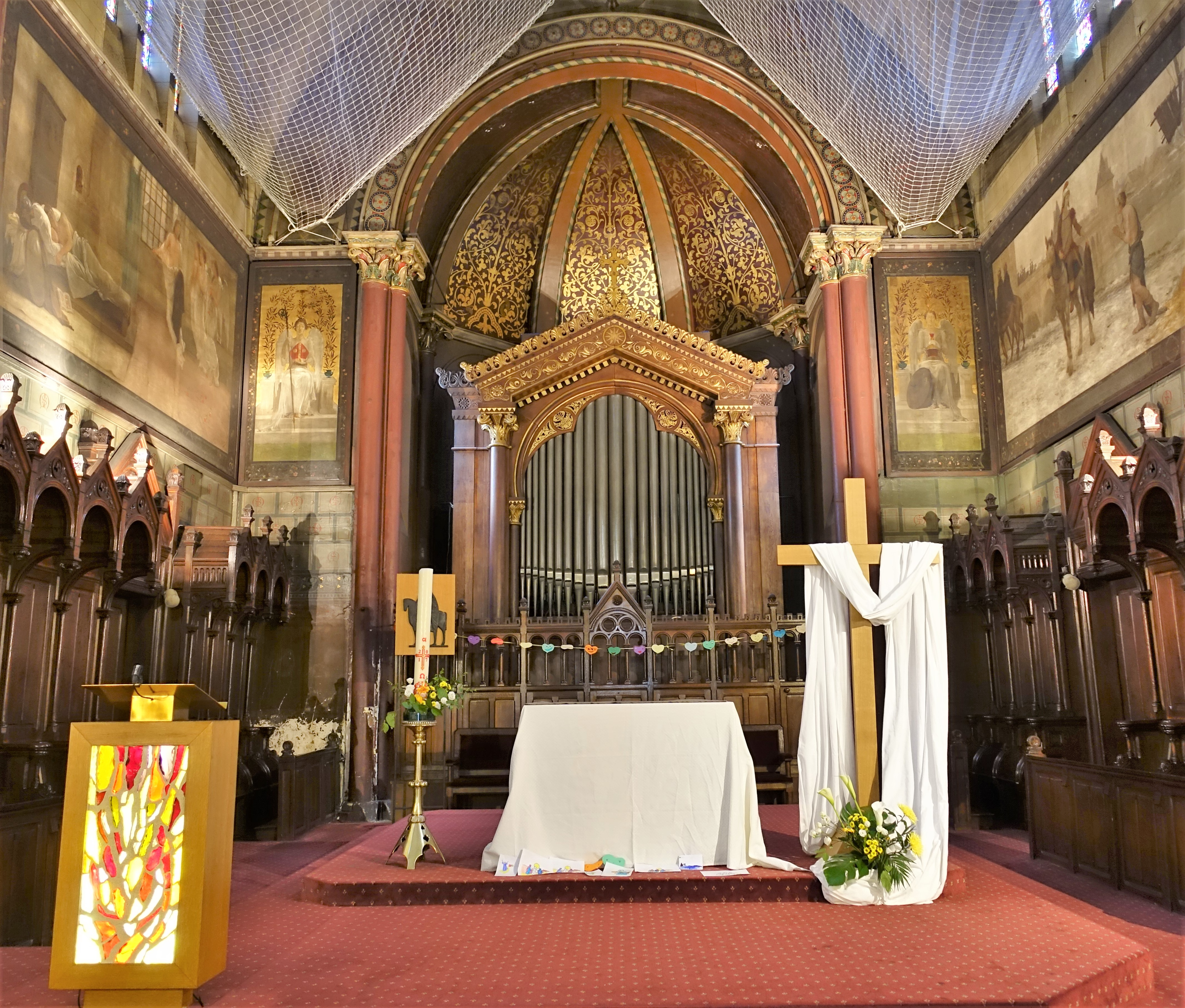
The choir, altar and the organ

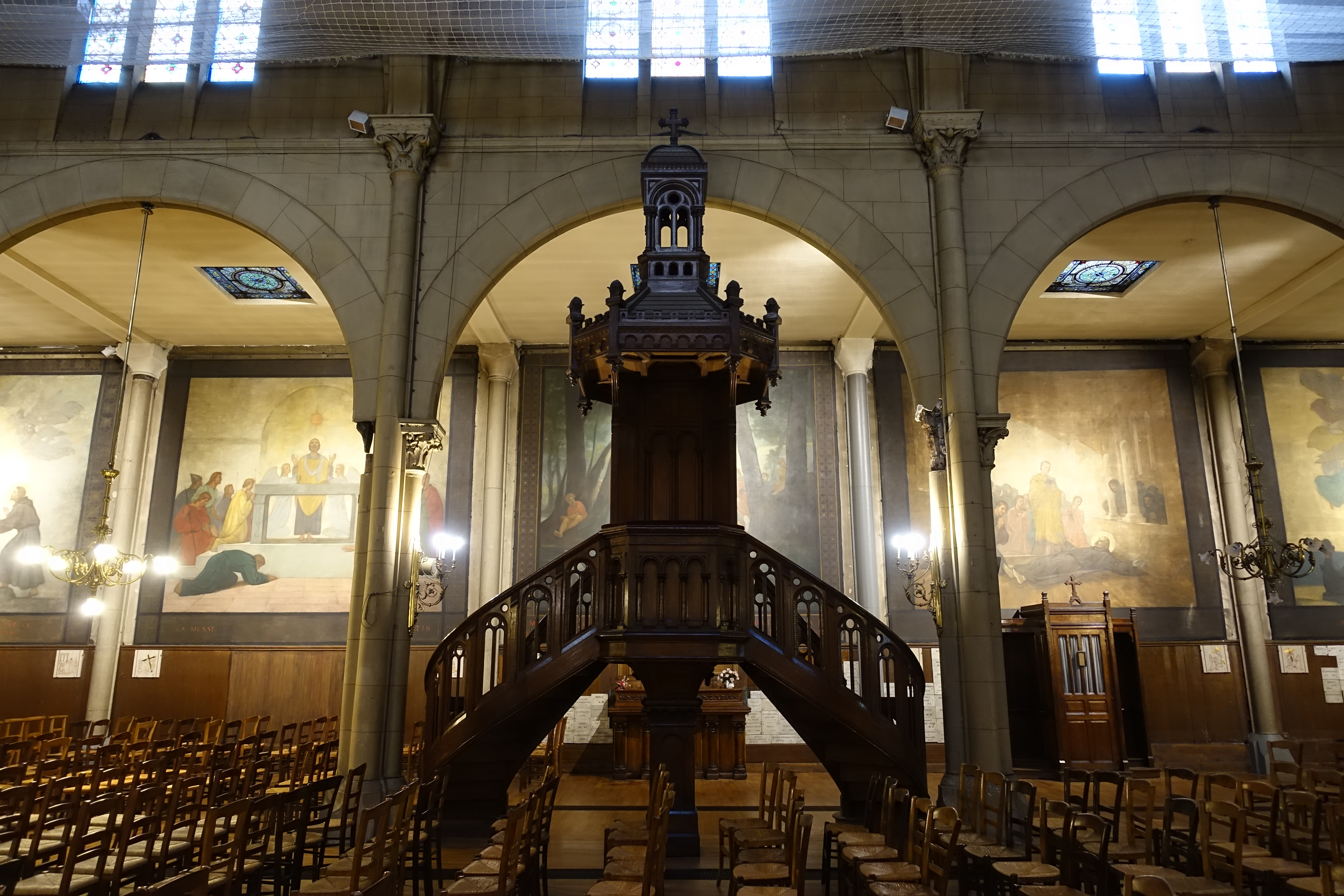
Pulpit with side aisles and murals

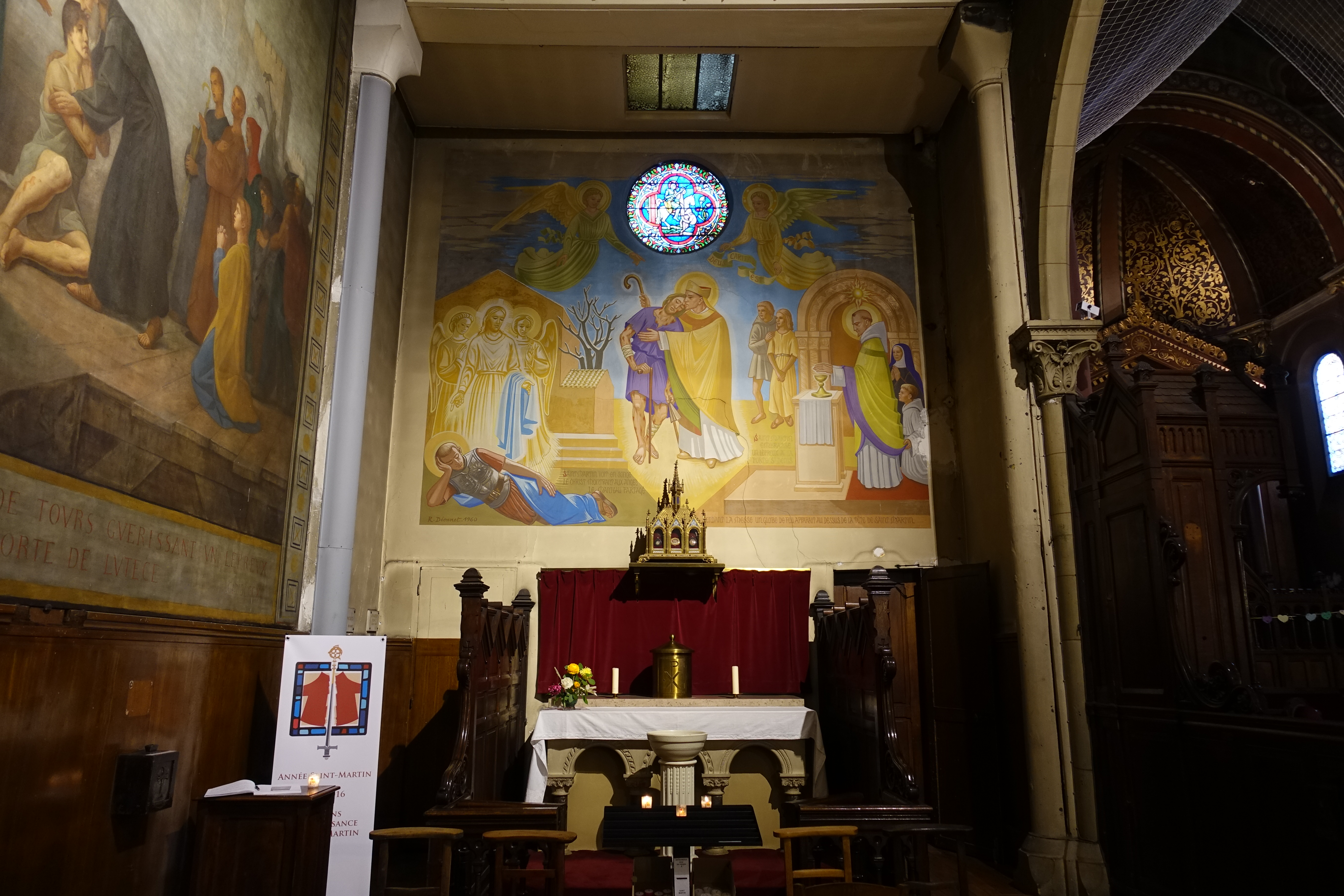
Side chapel

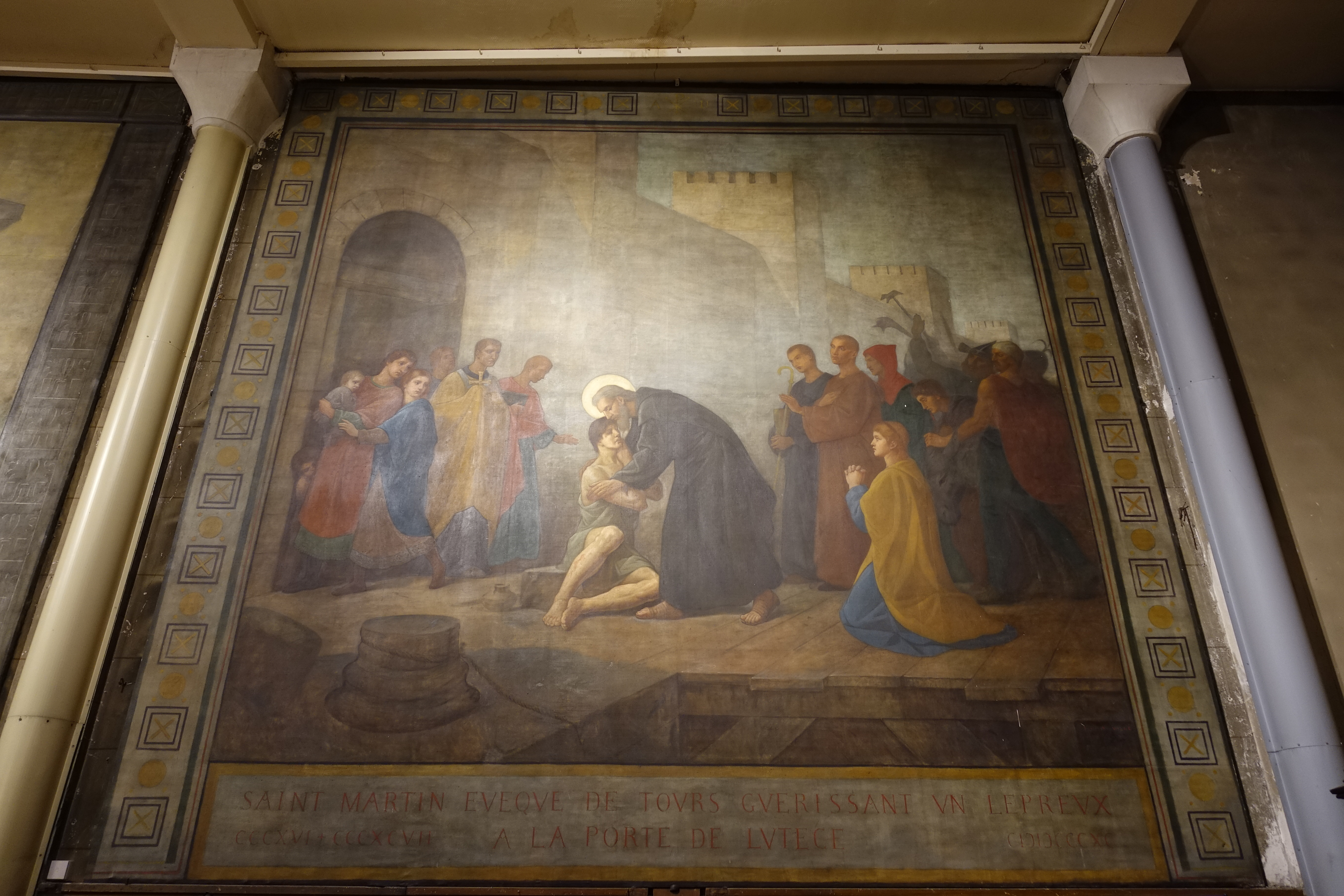
Mural of Saint Martin healing a leper by Henry Lerolle and Felix Ville

While the exterior of the church is rather austere, the interior is lavishly and colorfully decorated with murals and paintings. The choir and the sides of the nave are covered with murals in 1889-91 painted by Henry Lerolle (1848–1929) and Félix Villé (1819-1907, which depict scenes from the life of Saint Martin of Tours. The oak stalls were made by Moisseron and Andre 'd'Angers in 1881. The choir was redecorated in 1987 with a new altar and an Ambon decorated with stained glass windows made by Guy Hermet (born 1937) illustrating the miracle of the Burning Bush.

== Organ ==
The organ has an unusual location in the center of the choir. It was built by Cavaille-Coll in the second half of the 19th century. It has two keyboards and nineteen jeux, or effects.

== Bells ==
The church has three bells in the bell tower which were placed there in 1933. They were given the names, in order of increasing size, of Thérèse of the Infant Jesus; Joan of Arc, and Martine. The first two bells can be rung either by striking with a hammer from the exterior or by swinging. The third bell has an electric motor and an automatic control which rings the traditional Angelus every day at 12:30 and 19:30.
