= 3rd arrondissement of Paris =

- Municipal arrondissement
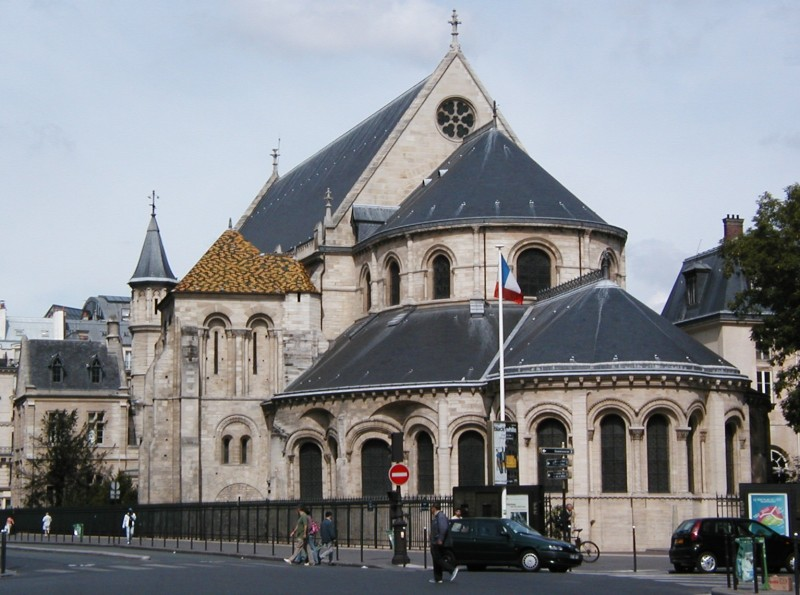
- The Musée des Arts et Métiers in the medieval priory of Saint-Martin-des-Champs

- Coat of arms

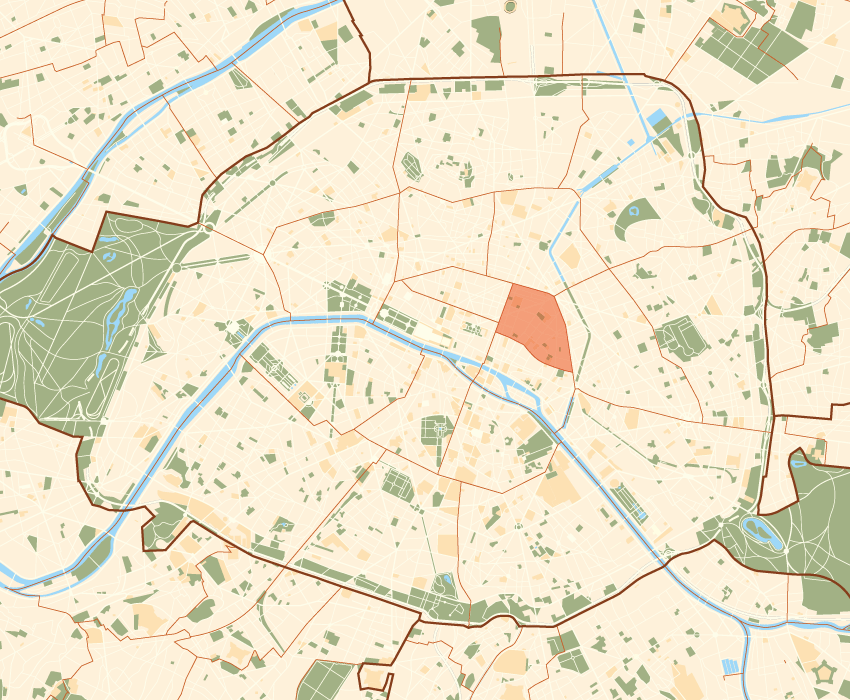
- Location within Paris
- Coordinates: 48°51′49.75″N 2°21′41.97″E
- Country: France
- Region: Île-de-France
- Department: Paris
- Commune: Paris

Government
  - Mayor (2020–2026): Ariel Weil (PS)
- Area: 1.17 km^{2} (0.45 sq mi)
- Population (2023): 32,179
  - Density: 27,500/km^{2} (71,200/sq mi)
- INSEE code: 75103

The 3rd arrondissement of Paris (III^{e} arrondissement, French pronunciation: [tʁwɑzjɛm aʁɔ̃dismɑ̃]) is one of the 20 arrondissements (districts) of the capital city of France. In spoken French, this arrondissement is colloquially referred to as "le troisième" (French pronunciation: [lə tʁwɑzjɛm]) meaning "the third". Its postal code is 75003. It is governed locally together with the 1st, 2nd and 4th arrondissements, with which it forms the 1st sector of Paris, Paris Centre. In 2023, it had a population of 32,179.

The arrondissement, sometimes known as Temple and situated on the right bank of the River Seine, is the smallest in area after the 2nd. It contains the quieter northern part of the medieval district of Le Marais, while the more lively southern part, notably including the gay district of Paris, is located within the 4th arrondissement.

== History ==
The oldest surviving private house in Paris, built in 1407, is to be found in the 3rd arrondissement at 51 rue de Montmorency.

The ancient Jewish quarter, the Pletzl (פלעצל, 'little place' in Yiddish), which dates from the 13th century, begins in the eastern part of the 3rd arrondissement and extends into the 4th. It is home to the Musée d'Art et d'Histoire du Judaïsme ('Museum of Jewish Art and History') and the Agoudas Hakehilos synagogue designed by the architect Hector Guimard. Although fashionable boutiques now take up many of the storefronts, there are still landmark stores selling traditional Jewish foods.

A small but slowly expanding Chinatown, inhabited by immigrants from Wenzhou, centers on the rue au Maire, near the Conservatoire national des arts et métiers and the Musée des Arts et Métiers, partly housed in the medieval priory of Saint-Martin-des-Champs.

== Geography ==
=== Size ===
With a land area of 1.2 km^{2} (0.452 square miles, or 289 acres), the 3rd arrondissement ranks second smallest in the city.

=== Location ===
It is situated in what is considered Central Paris on the right bank (rive droite) of the city. Its interior is mostly devoid of the large Haussmannian boulevards included in many other arrondissements throughout the city.

=== Neighborhoods (quartiers) ===
The quarters of the 3rd arrondissement

The arrondissement includes a range of neighborhoods or quartiers most of which date back to the Middle Ages. Most residents and locals refer to this area as Temple, Arts et Métiers or more generally, le Marais; however most of the Marais district is included in the 4th arrondissement, which it neighbors on its southern border.

The administrative quarters are:

- Quartier des Arts-et-Métiers (9)
- Quartier des Enfants-Rouges (10)
- Quartier des Archives (11)
- Quartier Sainte-Avoye (12)

== Demographics ==
The area now occupied by the third arrondissement attained its peak population in the period preceding the re-organization of Paris in 1860. In 1999, the arrondissement hosted a total of 29,723 jobs.

=== Historical population ===
Historical population

Year	Pop.	±% p.a.
1861	99,116	—
1872	89,687	−0.90%
1881	96,006	+0.76%
1891	90,000	−0.64%
1901	90,230	+0.03%
1911	86,811	−0.39%
1921	77,627	−1.11%
1931	70,971	−0.89%
1936	66,233	−1.37%
1946	65,312	−0.14%
1954	65,312	+0.00%

Year	Pop.	±% p.a.
1962	62,680	−0.51%
1968	56,252	−1.79%
1975	41,706	−4.18%
1982	36,094	−2.04%
1990	35,102	−0.35%
1999	34,248	−0.27%
2007	34,576	+0.12%
2012	35,991	+0.81%
2017	34,115	−1.06%
2023	32,179	−0.97%

Source: Demographia (1861-1999) and INSEE (1876-2023)

=== Immigration ===
Place of birth of residents of the 3rd arrondissement in 1999
Born in metropolitan France	Born outside metropolitan France			
73.4%	26.6%			
73.4%	Born in overseas France	Born in foreign countries with French citizenship at birth^{1}	EU-15 immigrants^{2}	Non-EU-15 immigrants
73.4%	0.8%	4.4%	5.8%	15.6%
^{1} This group is made up largely of former French settlers, such as pieds-noirs in Northwest Africa, followed by former colonial citizens who had French citizenship at birth (such as was often the case for the native elite in French colonies), as well as to a lesser extent foreign-born children of French expatriates. A foreign country is understood as a country not part of France in 1999, so a person born for example in 1950 in Algeria, when Algeria was an integral part of France, is nonetheless listed as a person born in a foreign country in French statistics.^{2} An immigrant is a person born in a foreign country not having French citizenship at birth. An immigrant may have acquired French citizenship since moving to France, but is still considered an immigrant in French statistics. On the other hand, persons born in France with foreign citizenship (the children of immigrants) are not listed as immigrants.

== Education ==
There are six public high-schools in the 3rd arrondissement, and no private high-schools.

- Lycée Victor Hugo, 27 rue de Sevigné
- Lycée Turgot, 69 rue de Turbigo
- Lycée Simone Veil, 7 rue de Poitou
- Lycée Professionel François Truffaut, 28 rue Debelleyeme
- Lycée professionnel de la bijouterie Nicolas Flamel (an annex of the École Boulle), 8 rue de Montmorency
- Lycée professionnel Abbé Grégoire, 70 bis, rue de Turbigo

The Conservatoire national des arts et métiers (CNAM) has its main Paris campus in the area around the métro station to which it gives its name. A grande école, CNAM provides university-level technical and professional qualifications to a student body of over 25,000.

== Map ==
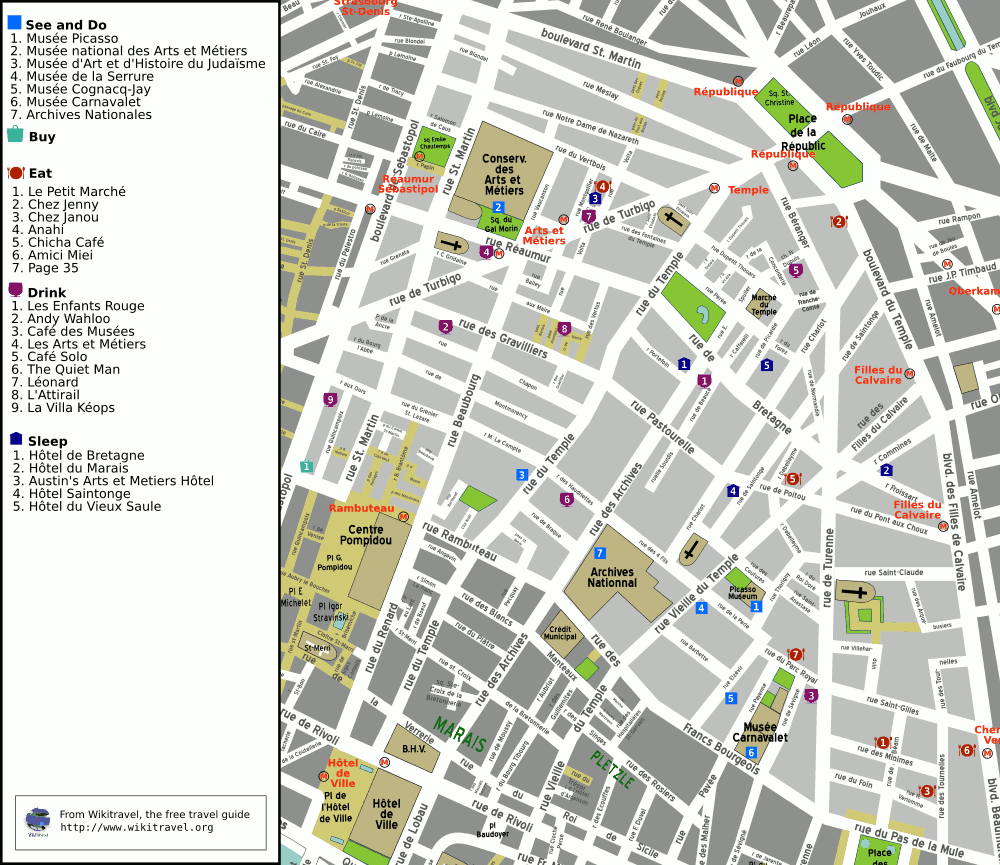
Map of the 3rd arrondissement

== Places of interest ==
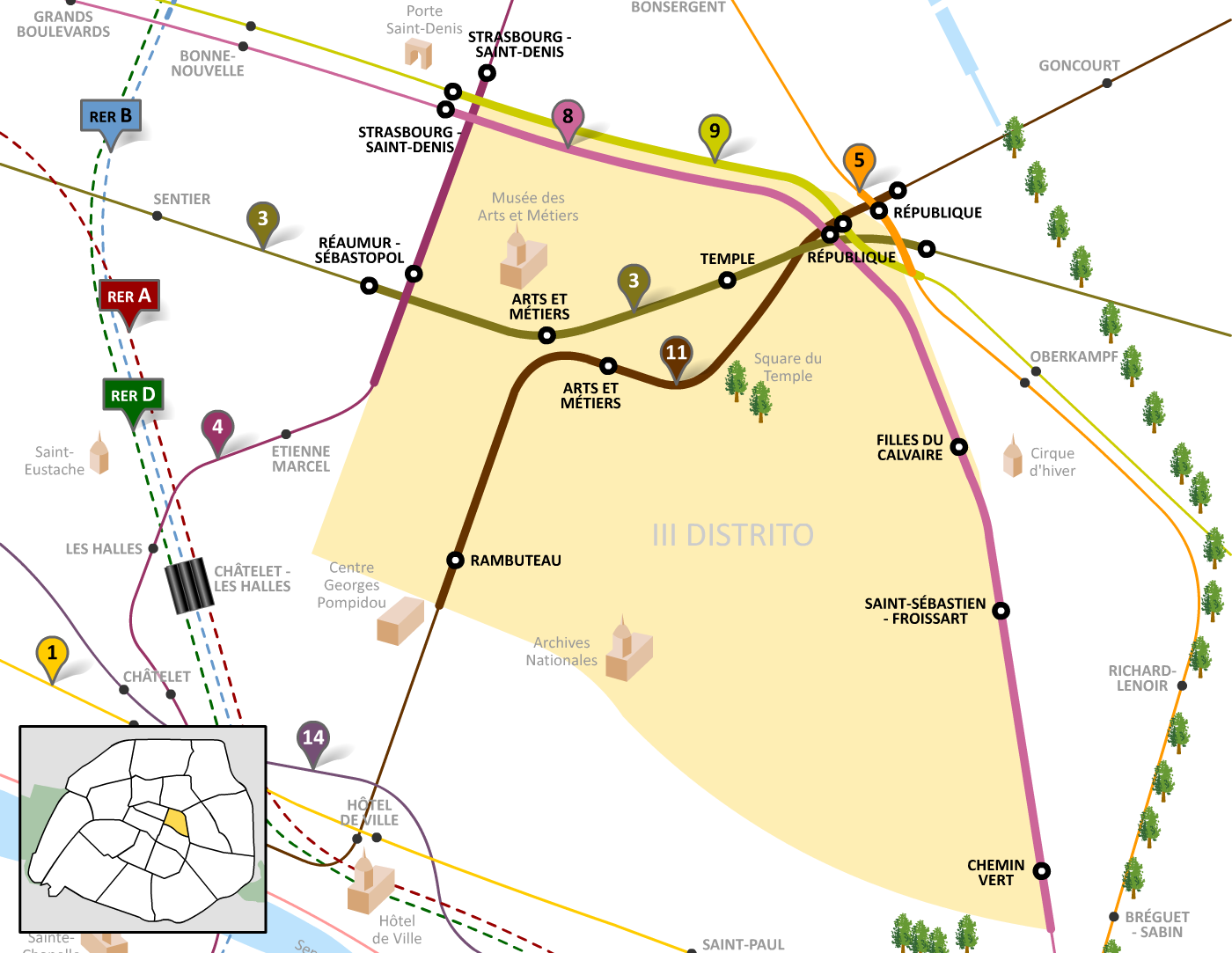

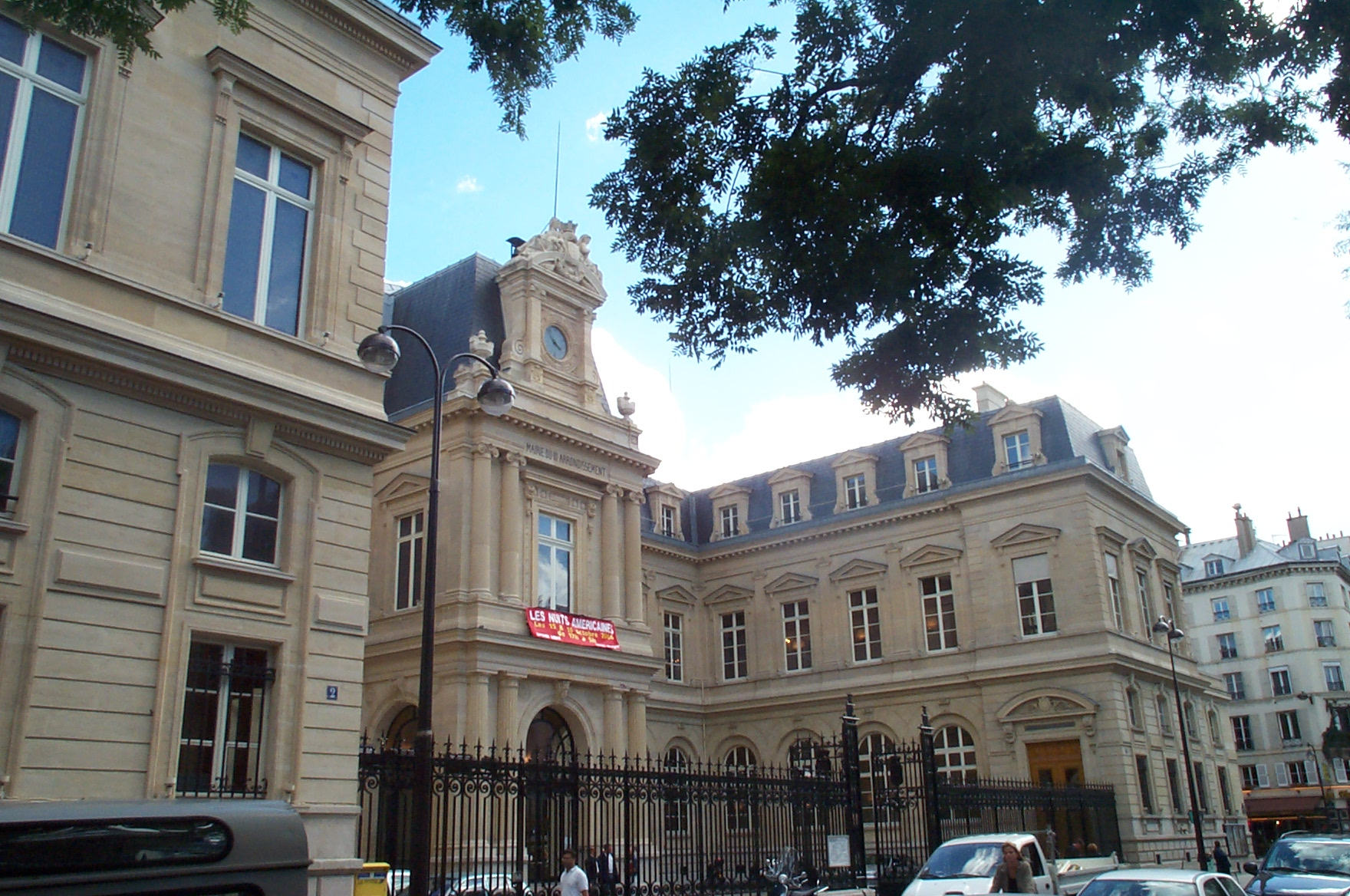
The Mairie (town hall) of the 3rd arrondissement

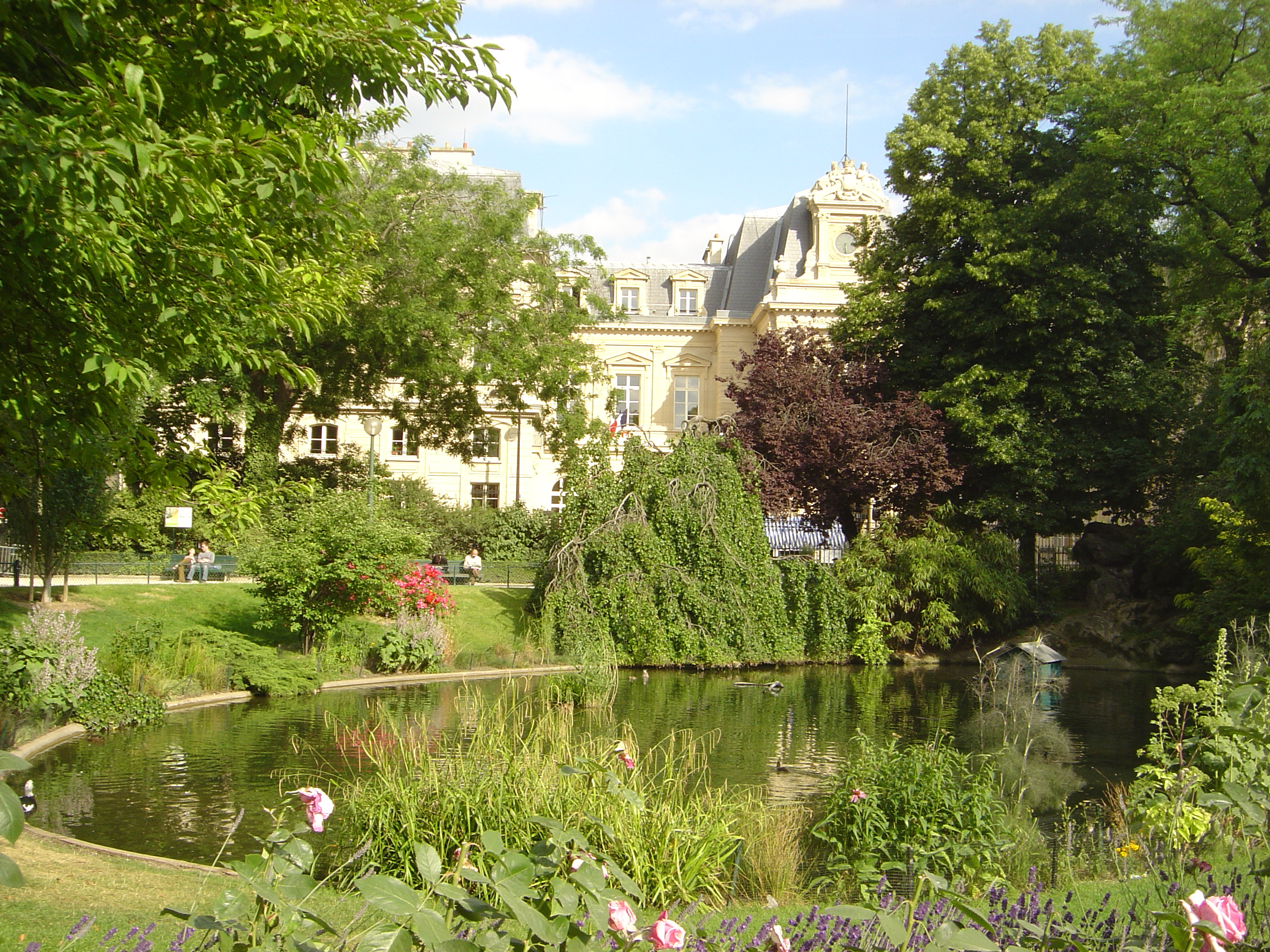
Square du Temple

=== Museums ===
There are 9 museums alone in the 3rd arrondissement as listed by the Paris office of tourism, however there are also many other smaller museums, as listed below.

- Musée des Arts et Métiers
- Musée de la Chasse et de la Nature
- Musée Cognacq-Jay
- Musée Picasso
- Musée de la Poupée
- Musée de la Serrure
- Musée des Archives Nationales - Hôtel de Soubise
- Musée d'Art et d'Histoire du Judaïsme
- Musée Carnavalet - Histoire de Paris
- Henri Cartier-Bresson Foundation
- La Gaîté Lyrique

=== Gardens ===
There are 6 smaller gardens throughout the 3rd arrondissement.

- Square du Temple - Elie-Wiesel
- Square Saint-Gilles Grand Veneur - Pauline-Roland
- Jardin de Rohan
- Square Georges Cain
- Square Léopold-Achille
- Jardin Anne Frank
- Jardin de l'Hotel Salé - Léonor Fini
- Jardin des Archives Nationale

=== Churches ===
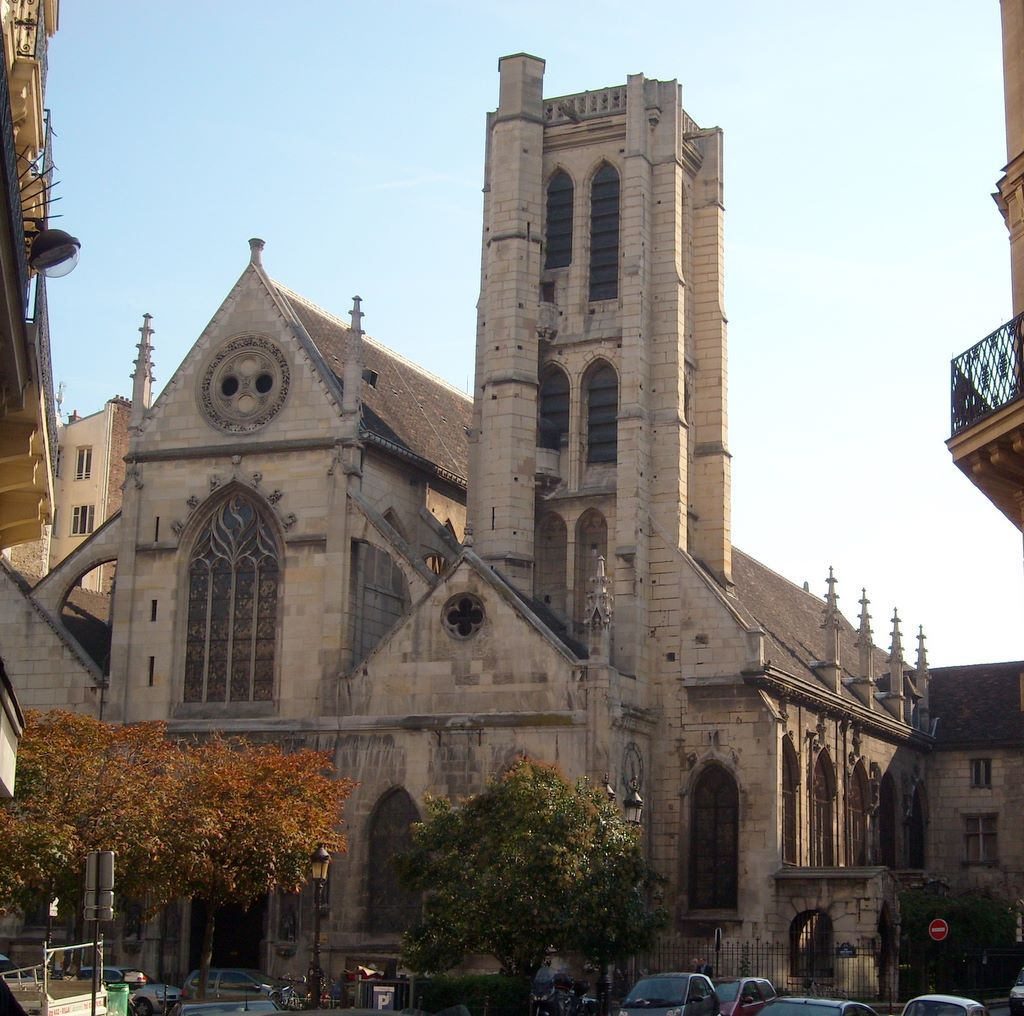
Church of Saint-Nicolas-des-Champs in Le Marais

- Saint-Denys-du-Saint-Sacrement
- Saint-Nicolas-des-Champs, Paris

=== Other ===
- Le Marais (shared with the 4th arrondissement)
- Conservatoire National des Arts et Métiers - main campus
- Le Défenseur du Temps
- Institut Tessin
- Hôtel de Soubise
- Former Temple fortress
- Carreau du Temple
- Théâtre Déjazet
