= Place Harvey-Milk =

Public square in Paris, France

Place Harvey Milk
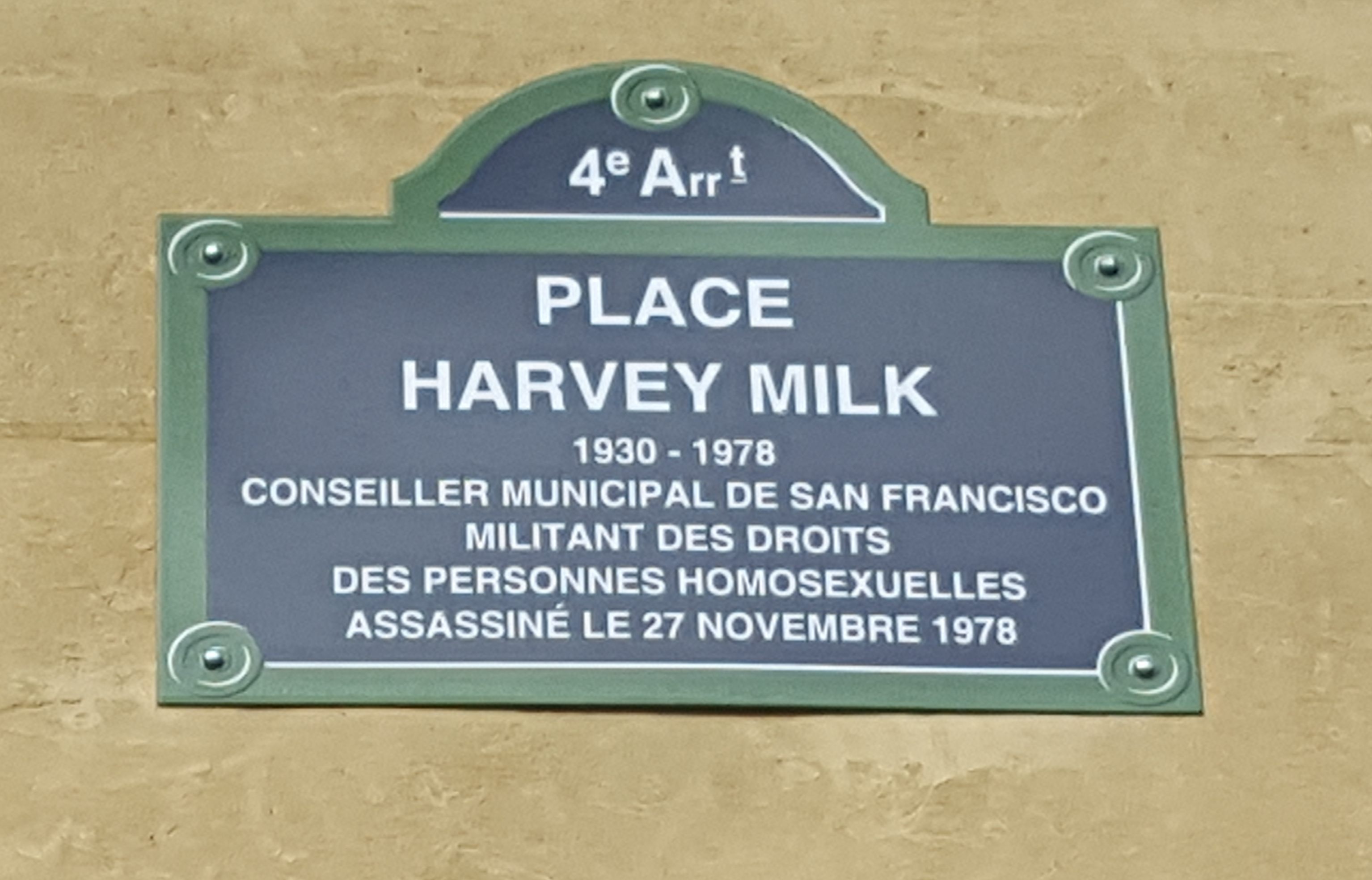
- The Place Harvey Milk, in Paris, Le Marais

- Location within Paris
- Arrondissement: 4th
- Quarter: Le Marais
- Coordinates: 48°51′27″N 2°21′16″E

Construction
- Denomination: 2019

The Place Harvey Milk is a public square in Paris, France. It lies at a junction in Le Marais, at the intersection of the Rue des Archives and the Rue de la Verrerie, at the heart of the French capital.

== Access ==
The nearest métro station is Hôtel de Ville.

The La Verrerie bus stop on RATP Bus Network line 75 is located on the square, which can also be reached by lines 67 69 70 72 74 at Place du Châtelet and Rue de Rivoli bus stops.

== History ==
In 2019, the Council of Paris decided to pay homage to the late San Francisco politician and pioneer of gay rights Harvey Milk. The square was inaugurated by local officials on June 19 of that year, in the presence of Milk's nephew Stuart Milk.

The same day, the city of Paris also honoured the American artist Gilbert Baker, gay rights activist, creator of the Rainbow Flag and friend of Harvey Milk, with an official plaque in his memory at the nearby Place des Émeutes-de-Stonewall.

== Features ==
The square stands 100m from the Paris City Hall, the seat of the Council of Paris, whose members voted to pay tribute to their late counterpart from San Francisco, who was assassinated in November 1978. Looking from the place Harvey Milk towards the Hôtel de Ville, Notre-Dame-de-Paris can be seen in perspective.

One year prior to the renaming of the junction, rainbow zebra crossings in the vicinity, which had been painted to commemorate Paris Pride, were tagged with homophobic graffiti. In response, the city council made the rainbow crossings permanent. The naming of the junction after Harvey Milk was praised by anti-homophobia organizations.

An entrance to the famous department store Bazar de l'Hôtel de Ville stands at one corner of the square.

== Gallery ==
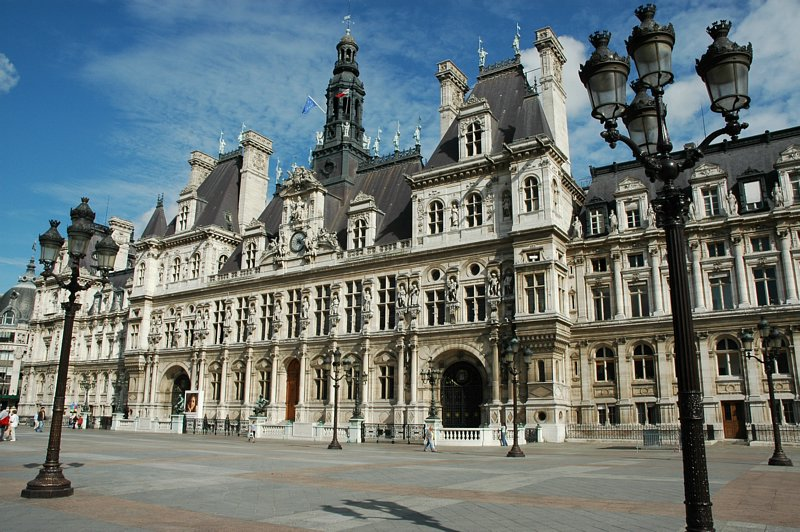
Paris City Hall, 100m from the place Harvey Milk, is located inside Le Marais, the Parisian gay village.

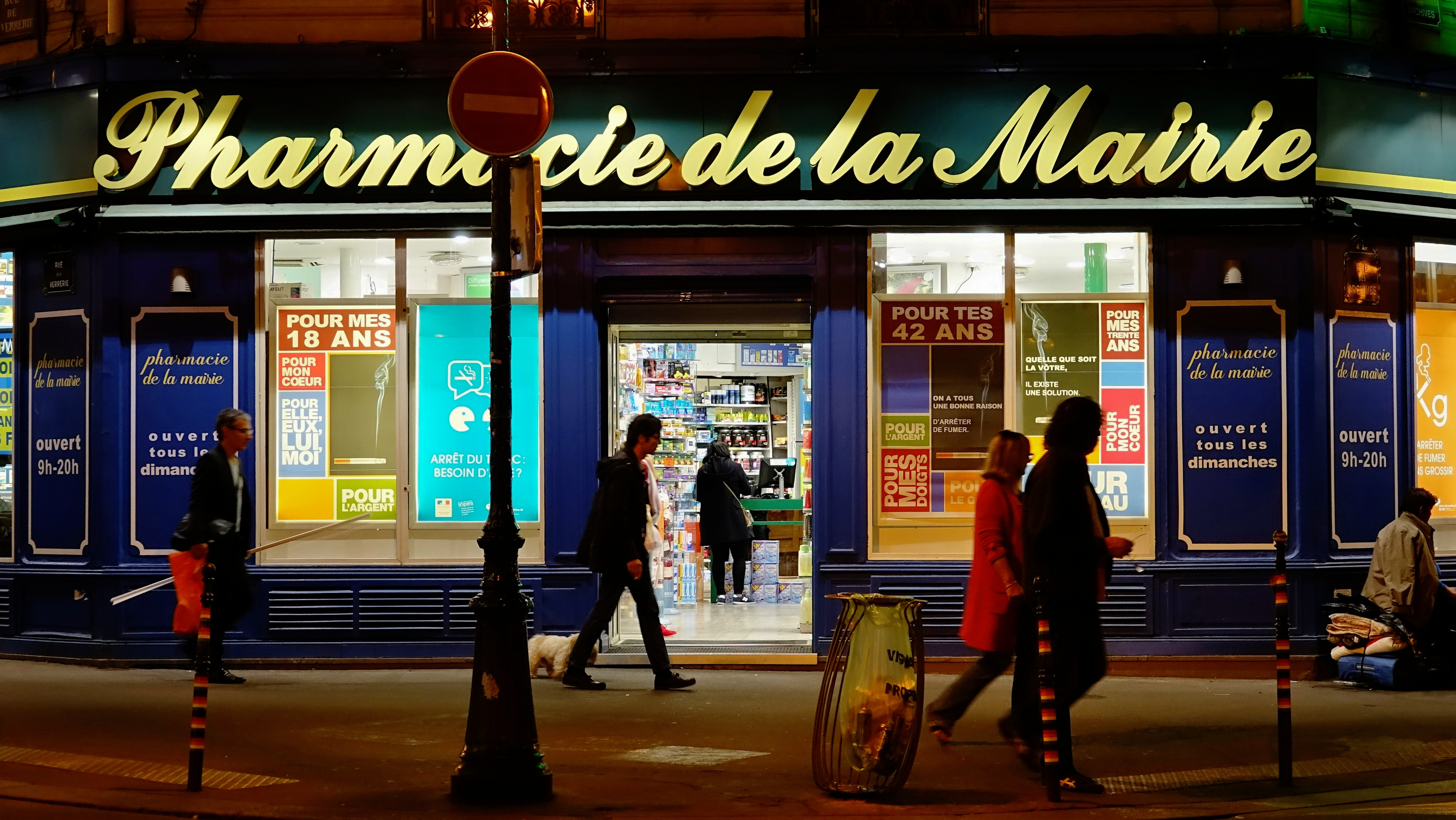
NW corner of the square : Pharmacie de la Mairie (Pharmacy).

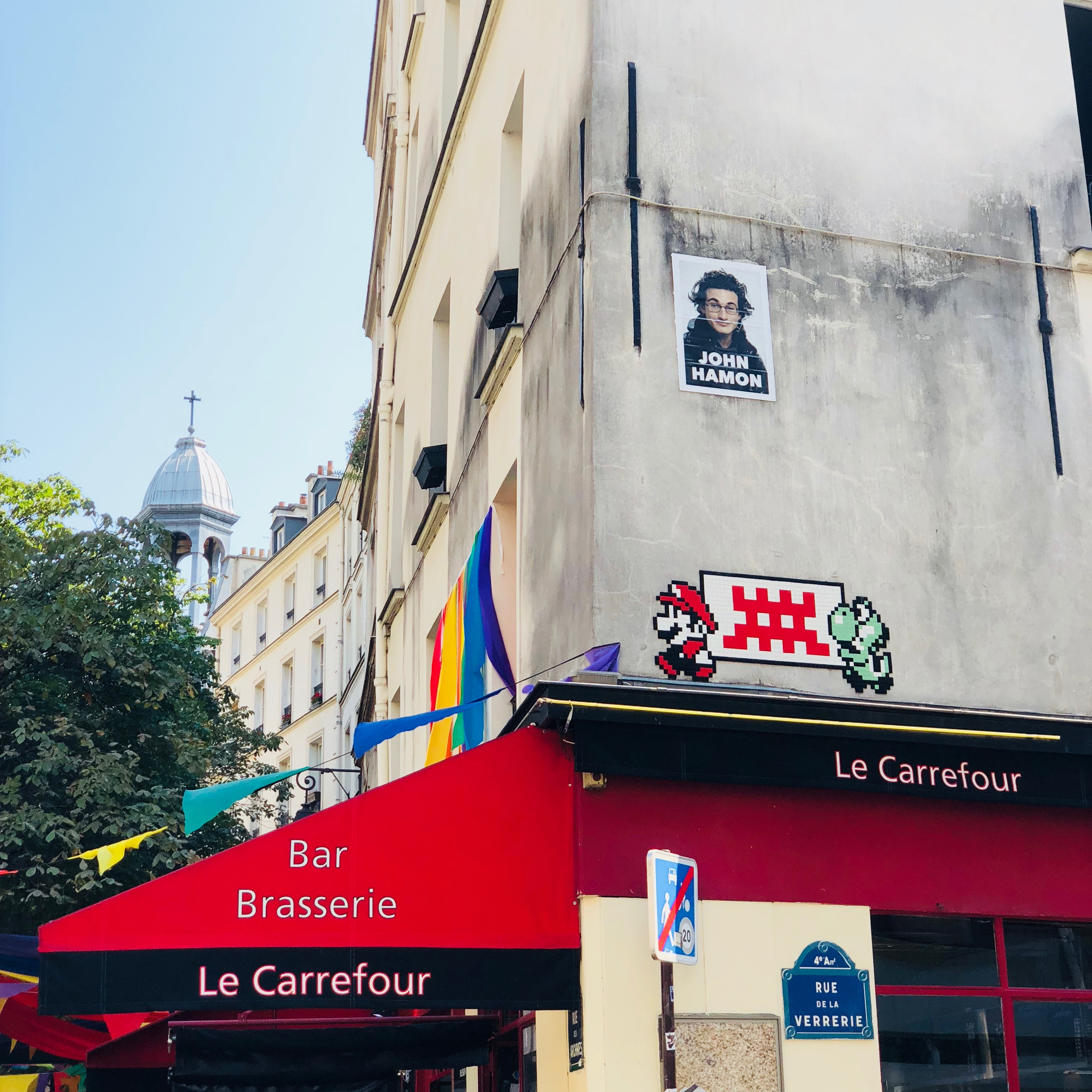
NE corner of the square : Brasserie Le Carrefour (Restaurant and café).

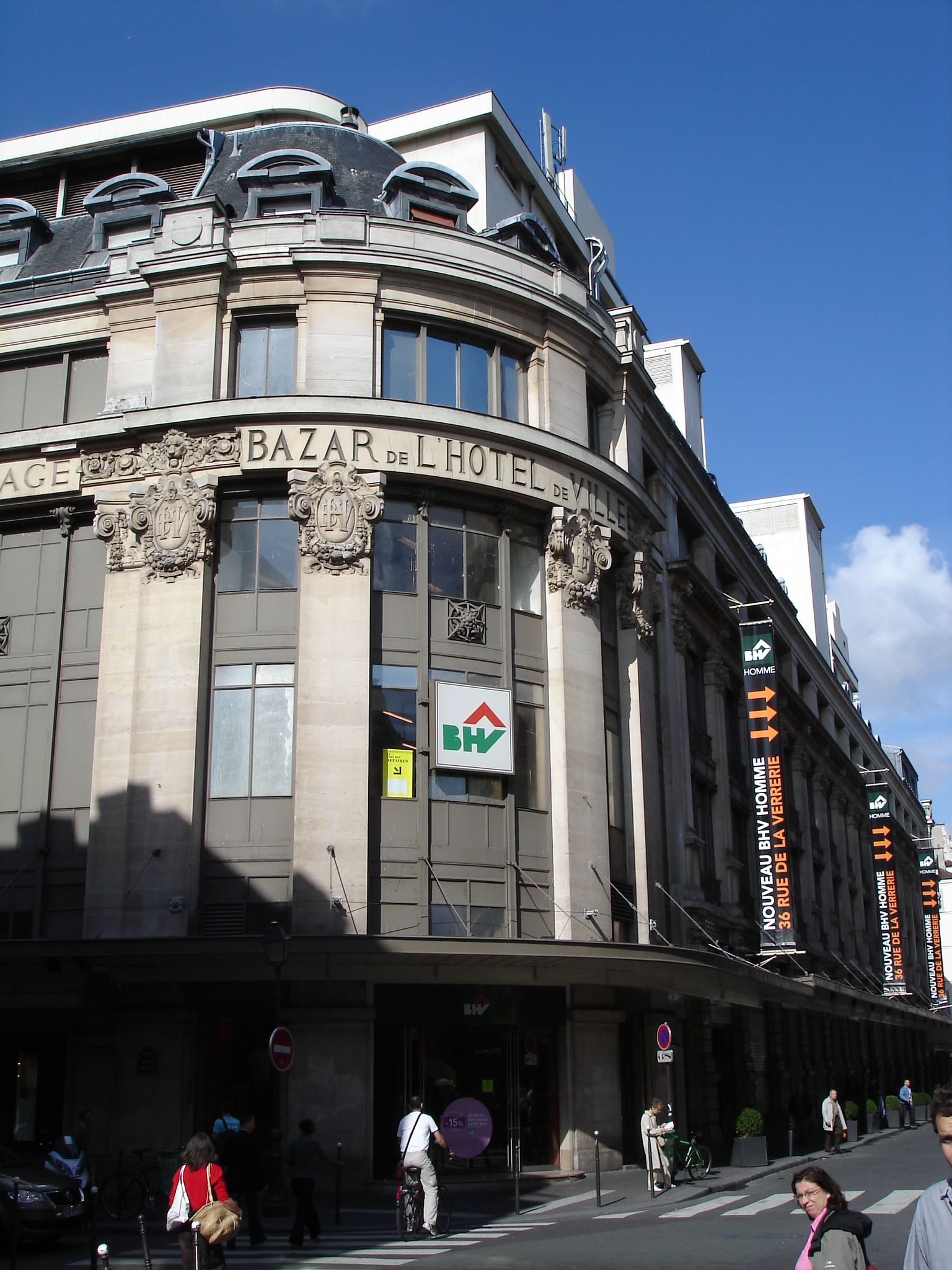
SW corner of the square : Bazar de l'Hôtel de Ville (department store).

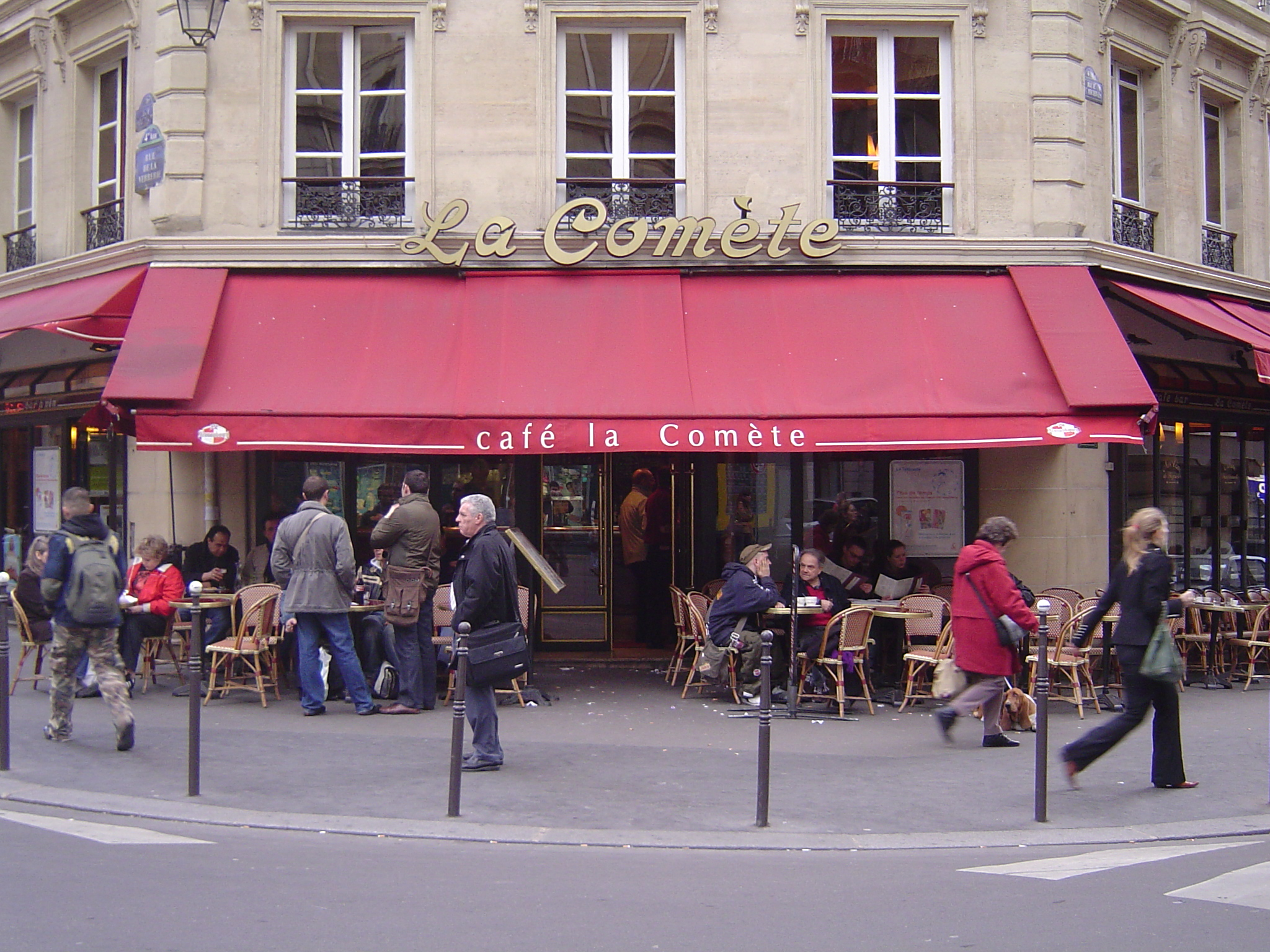
SE corner of the square : former La Comète restaurant. The premises are to be replaced by a boutique hotel.

== See also ==
- Le Marais
- LGBT culture in Paris
