= Rue des Archives =

Street in the Marais, Paris

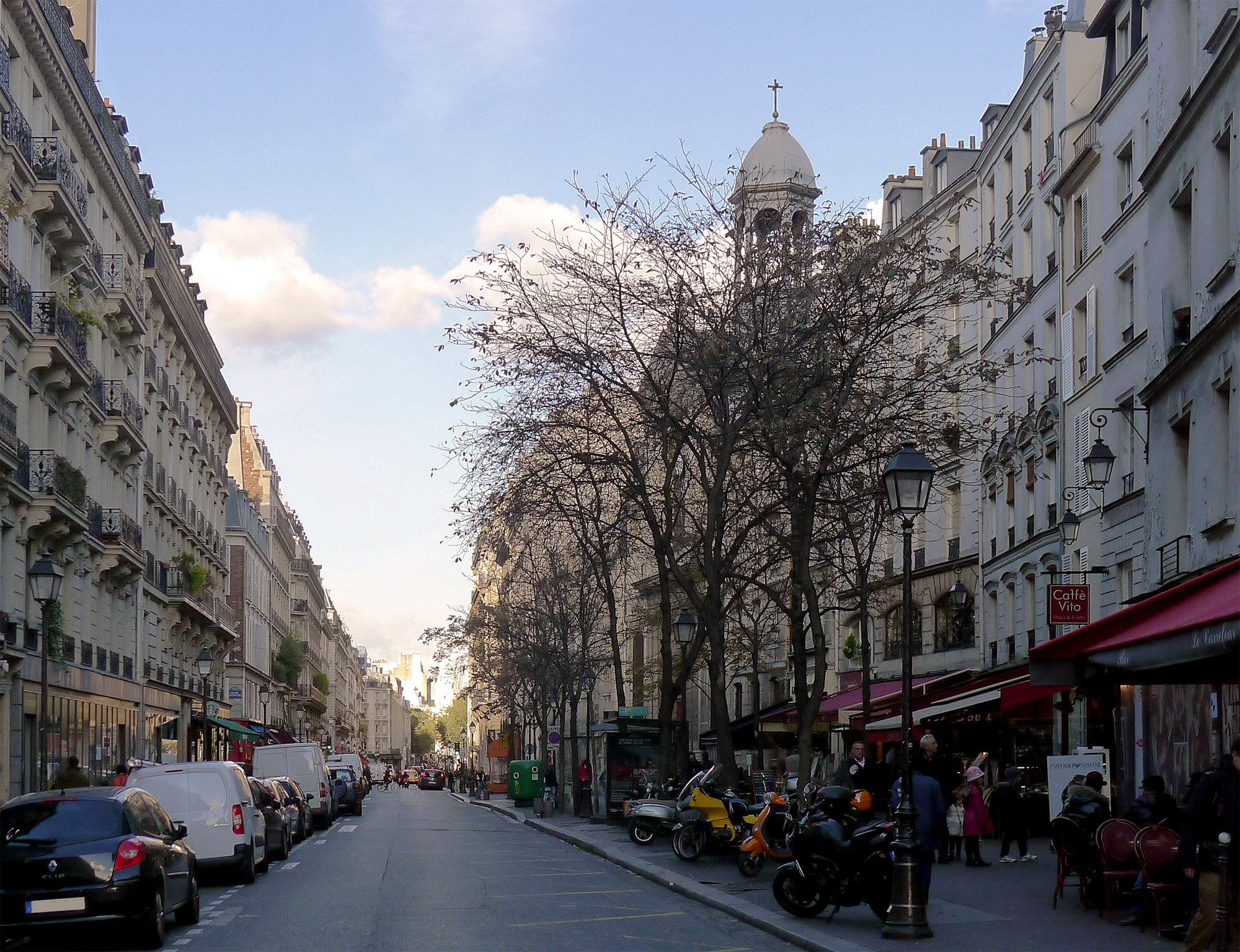

- Location within Paris
- Length: 900 m (3,000 ft)
- Width: 15 m (49 ft)
- Arrondissement: 3rd, 4th
- Quarter: Marais
- Coordinates: 48.86158°N 2.35867°E
- From: 50 Rue de Rivoli
- To: 51 Rue de Bretagne

Construction
- Completion: 1874
- Denomination: 13th century

The Rue des Archives is a street in Le Marais at the border of 3rd and 4th arrondissements of Paris, France.

== Location and access ==
The street is located in Le Marais district of central Paris. It is served by the metro stations Hôtel de Ville and Rambuteau.

== Origin of the name ==
This street owes its name to the fact that it runs alongside the Archives Nationales (National Archives) of France.

== History ==
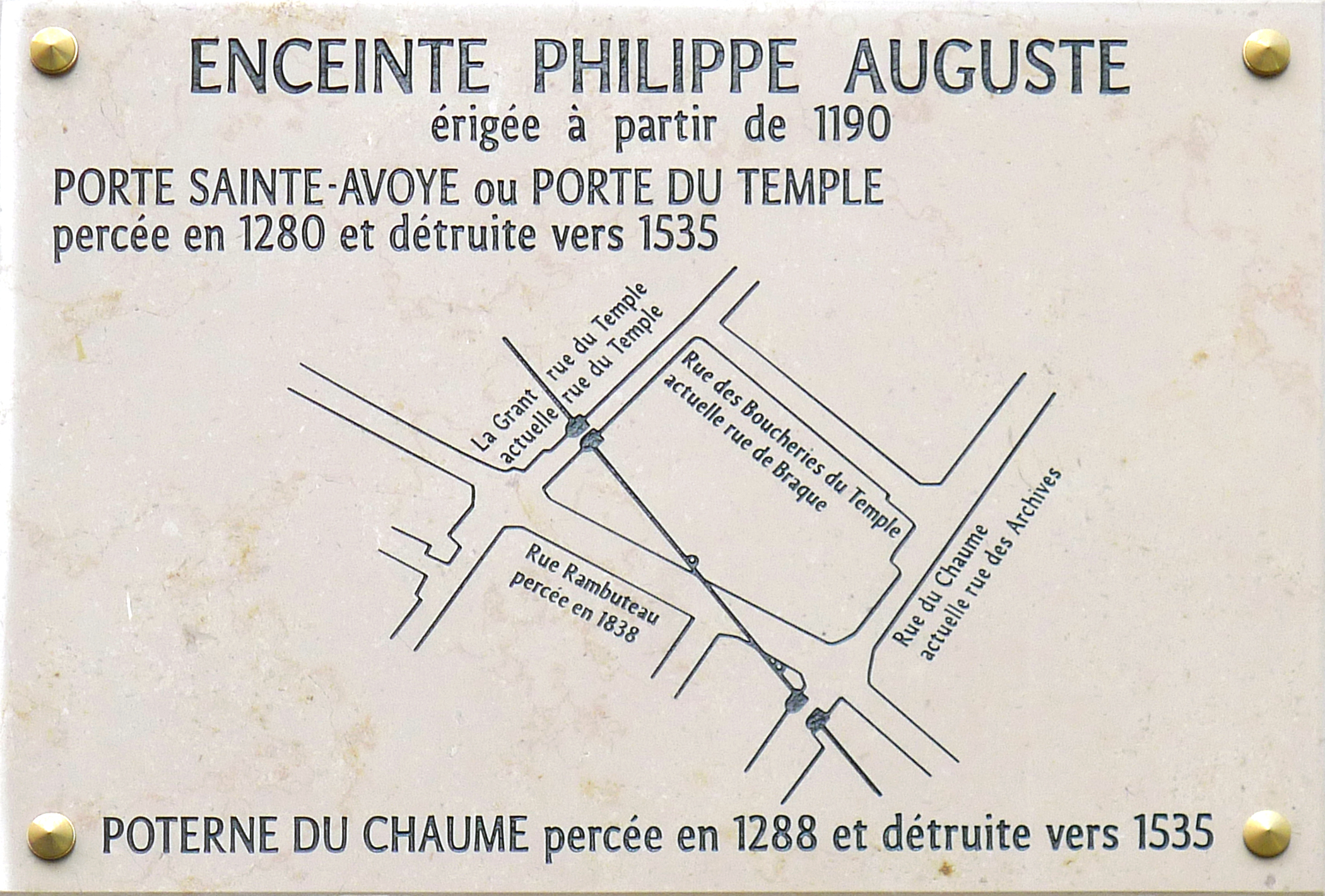
Map between the Rue du Temple (Porte du Temple) and the Rue des Archives (Porte du Chaume)

The enclosure of Philippe Auguste initially cut off the street at no. 54 before a gate, the Porte du Chaume, was created at the end of the 13th century.

The Rue du Chaume, Rue du Grand-Chantier, and Rue des Enfants-Rouges were opened at the end of the 13th century as the main road for the subdivision of the Ville-Neuve du Temple created by the order of the Templars and once formed the Rue Neuve-du-Temple.

On 23 May 1863, a decree declared the alignment of the Rue des Billettes, Rue de l'Homme-Armé, Rue du Chaume, Rue du Grand-Chantier, Rue des Enfants-Rouges, and Rue Molay. These streets were designed to form a single axis crossing Le Marais.

In 1874, the Rue des Archives was created by the merger of:

- the part of the Rue du Chaume between the Rue Rambuteau and the Rue des Haudriettes;
- the Rue du Grand-Chantier, between the Rue des Haudriettes and the Rue Pastourelle;
- the Rue des Enfants-Rouges, between the Rue Pastourelle and the Rue Portefoin;
- the Rue Molay, between the Rue Portefoin and the Rue Perrée.

In 1890, the street was extended between the Rue Rambuteau and the Rue de Rivoli by the absorption of:

- the Rue des Deux-Portes-Saint-Jean, between the Rue de Rivoli and the Rue de la Verrerie;
- the Rue des Billettes, between the Rue de la Verrerie and the Rue Sainte-Croix-de-la-Bretonnerie;
- the Rue de l'Homme-Armé, between the Rue Sainte-Croix-de-la-Bretonnerie and the Rue des Blancs-Manteaux;
- the part of the Rue du Chaume between the Rue des Blancs-Manteaux and the Rue Rambuteau.

Before 1910, the Rue des Archives ended at the Rue Dupetit-Thouars. At that time, the name of Rue Eugène-Spuller was given to the part of the Rue des Archives between the Rue de Bretagne and the Rue Dupetit-Thouars.

In 2019, three sections of the Rue des Archives were officially named (from north to south):

- Place Patrice-Chéreau (3rd arrondissement): square at the level of the Fontaine des Haudriettes, the Rue des Haudriettes;
- Place Ovida-Delect (4th arrondissement): square located at the crossroads of the Rue des Blancs-Manteaux;
- Place Harvey-Milk, (4th arrondissement): crossroads of the Rue des Archives and the Rue de la Verrerie.

== Buildings and structures ==
The plans decided in 1863 were not fully implemented and historical buildings have therefore been preserved:

- Nos 22 to 26: eastern part of the Rue des Billettes with mainly the Church of Les Billettes, with the oldest medieval cloister still existing in its original form in Paris. On this part, the constructions of only the odd side were destroyed and replaced by aligned Haussmannian buildings while the opposite bank has retained its old irregular layout.
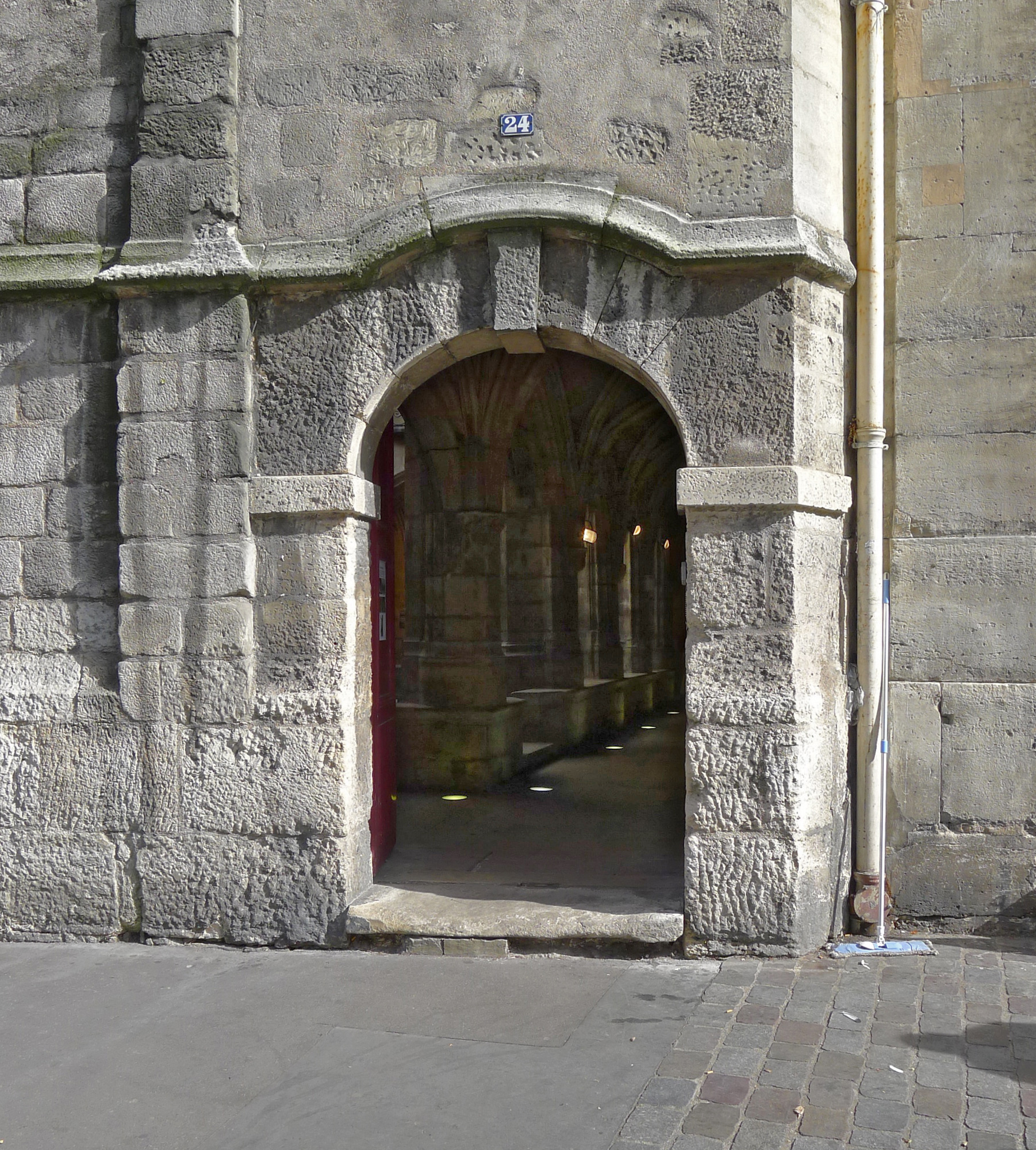
Nos 22–26: one of the entrances to the cloister
- No 34: Building whose 1st and 2nd floors were occupied from 1965 to 1980 by a specialized school for hearing impaired people: Le Collège et Lycée Privés Morvan (Le Cours Morvan), now at no 68 Rue de la Chaussée d'Antin, in the 9th arrondissement.
- No 40: House known as "Jacques Coeur" because it was owned by one of his descendants. Today there is a public nursery school there.
- No 45: Former convent of the Fathers of the Merci; there are two wall sundials inside the courtyard, only one visible from the street.

On the part along the former convent, the street has retained its original width.

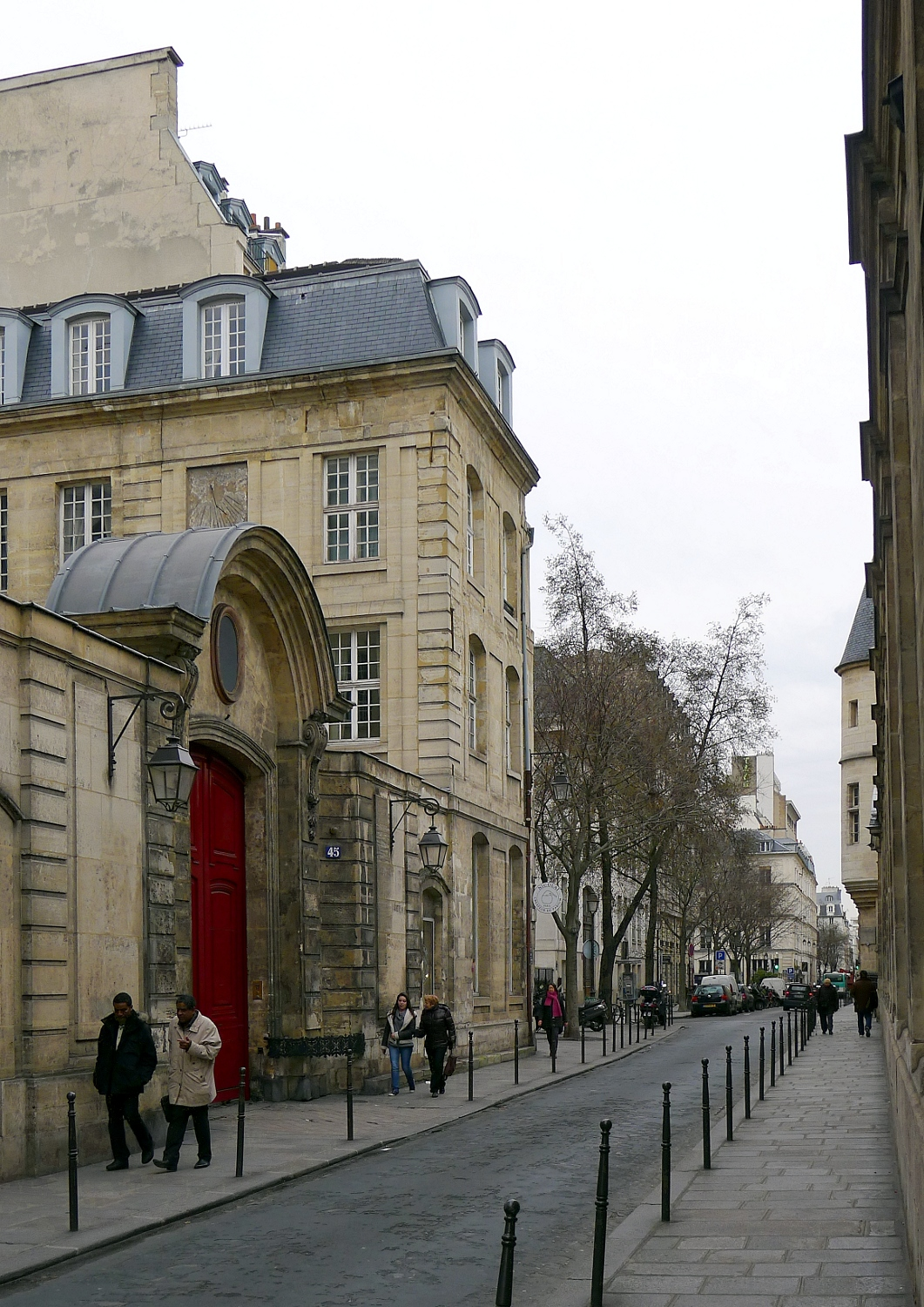
Rue des Archives at no 45

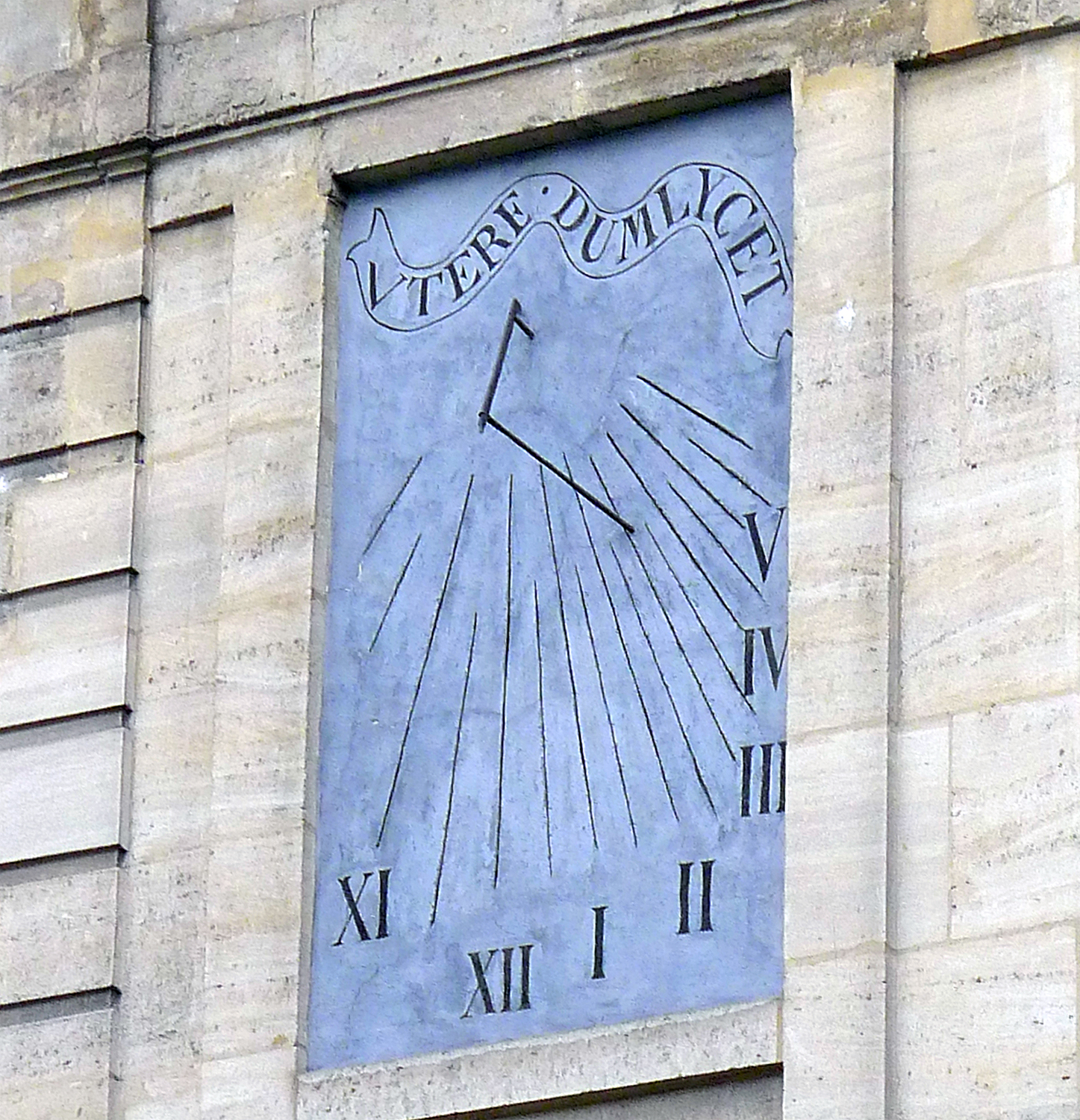
Sundial
- No 53: a dummy facade hides a transformer of Électricité de France (EDF).
- No 54: location of the old postern, called Postern du Chaume, opened in 1288 in the enclosure of Philippe Auguste.
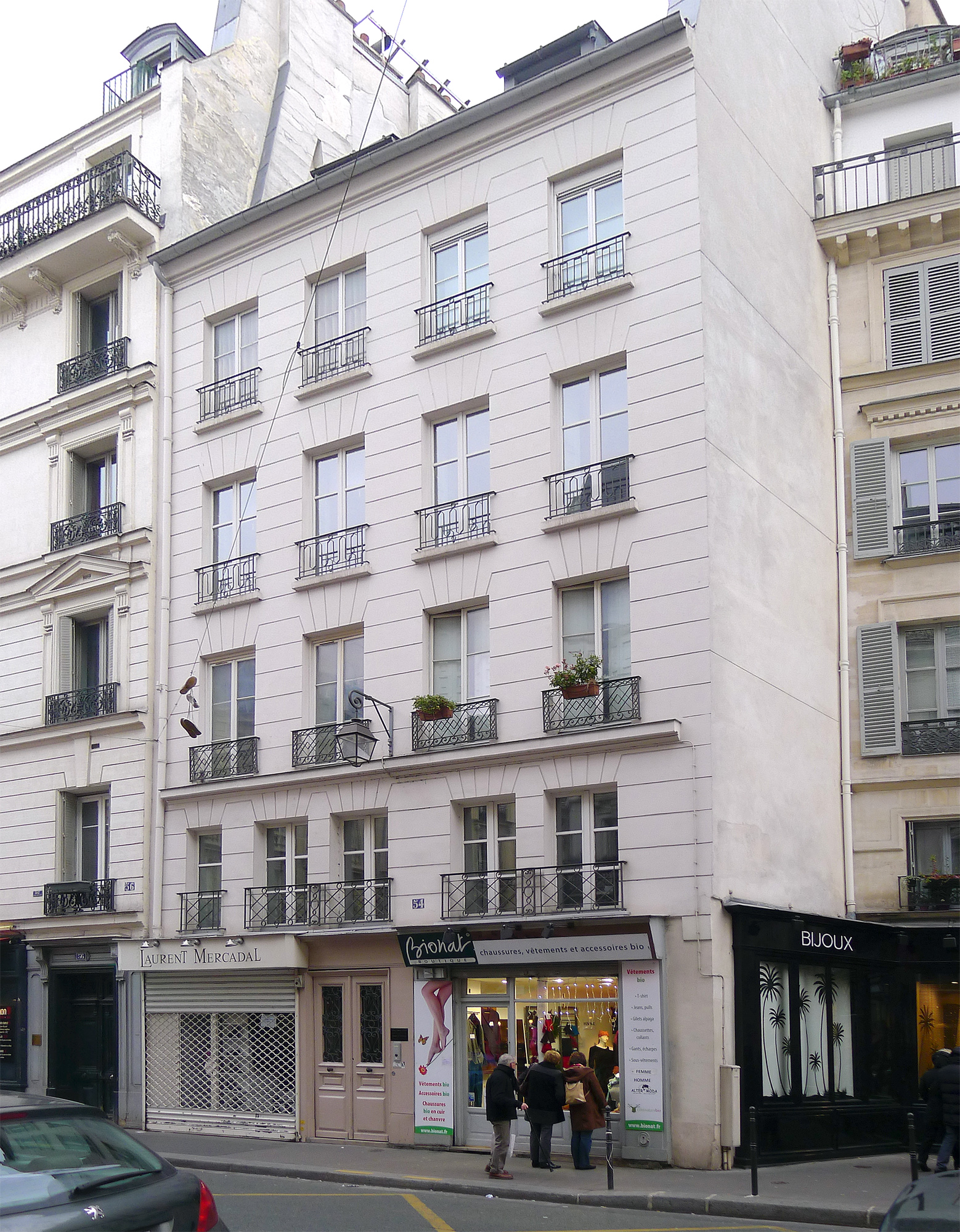
No 54: location of the old Porte du Chaume
- Northeast corner of the intersection of the Rue des Archives and the Rue des Francs-Bourgeois: remains of a fountain transformed into a viewing window during the reconstruction of the Hôtel de Soubise, then remodelled in 1959 after creating of a doorway. A plate indicates the sea level measured in the basin of the port of Marseille, as well as its difference with the zero level of the Pont de la Tournelle.
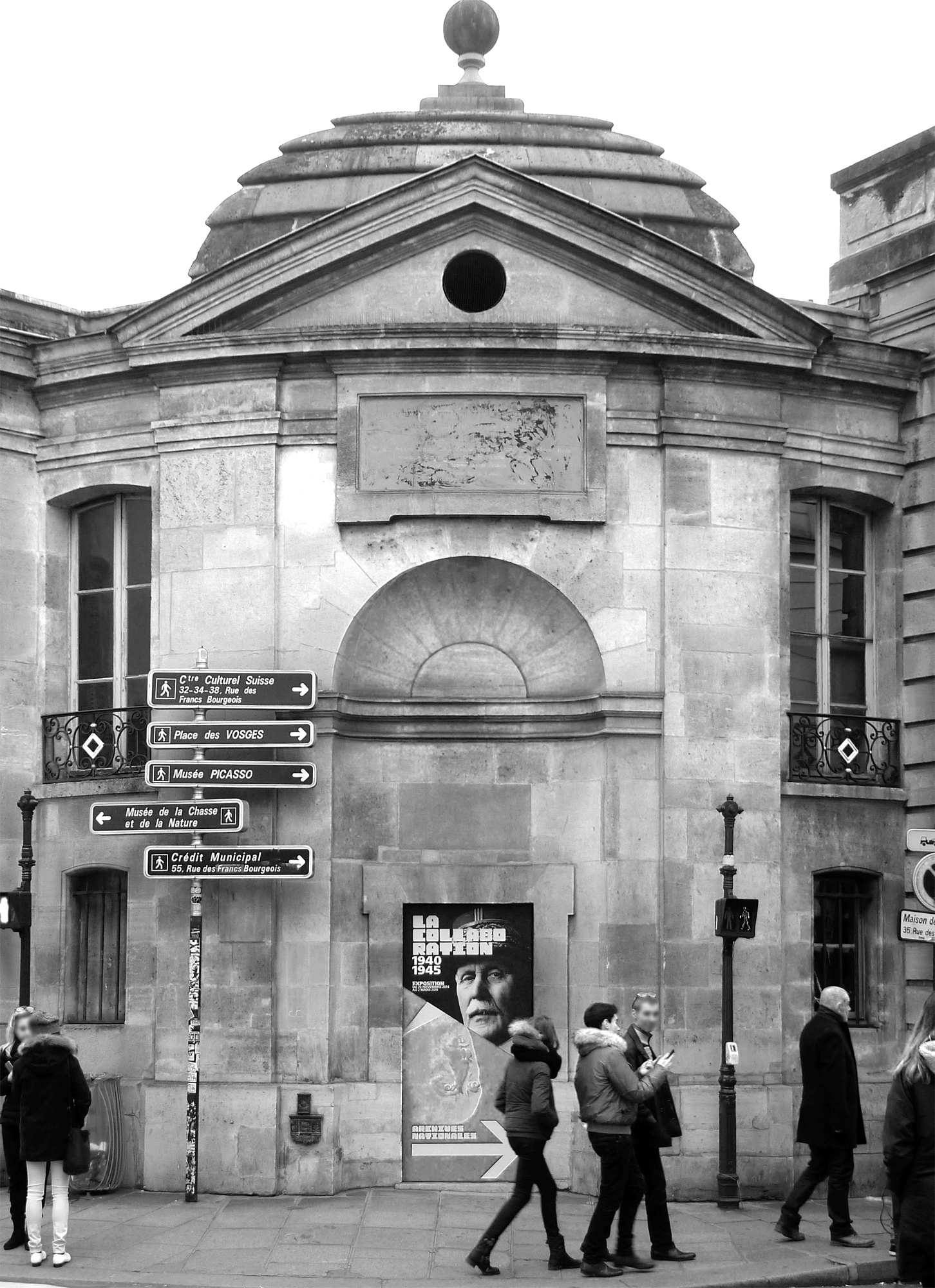
Remains of the ancient fountain of Chaume
- No 58: Hôtel de Soubise (housing the Musée des Archives Nationales, part of the Archives Nationales) and the fountain of Haudriettes, Rue du Chaume.
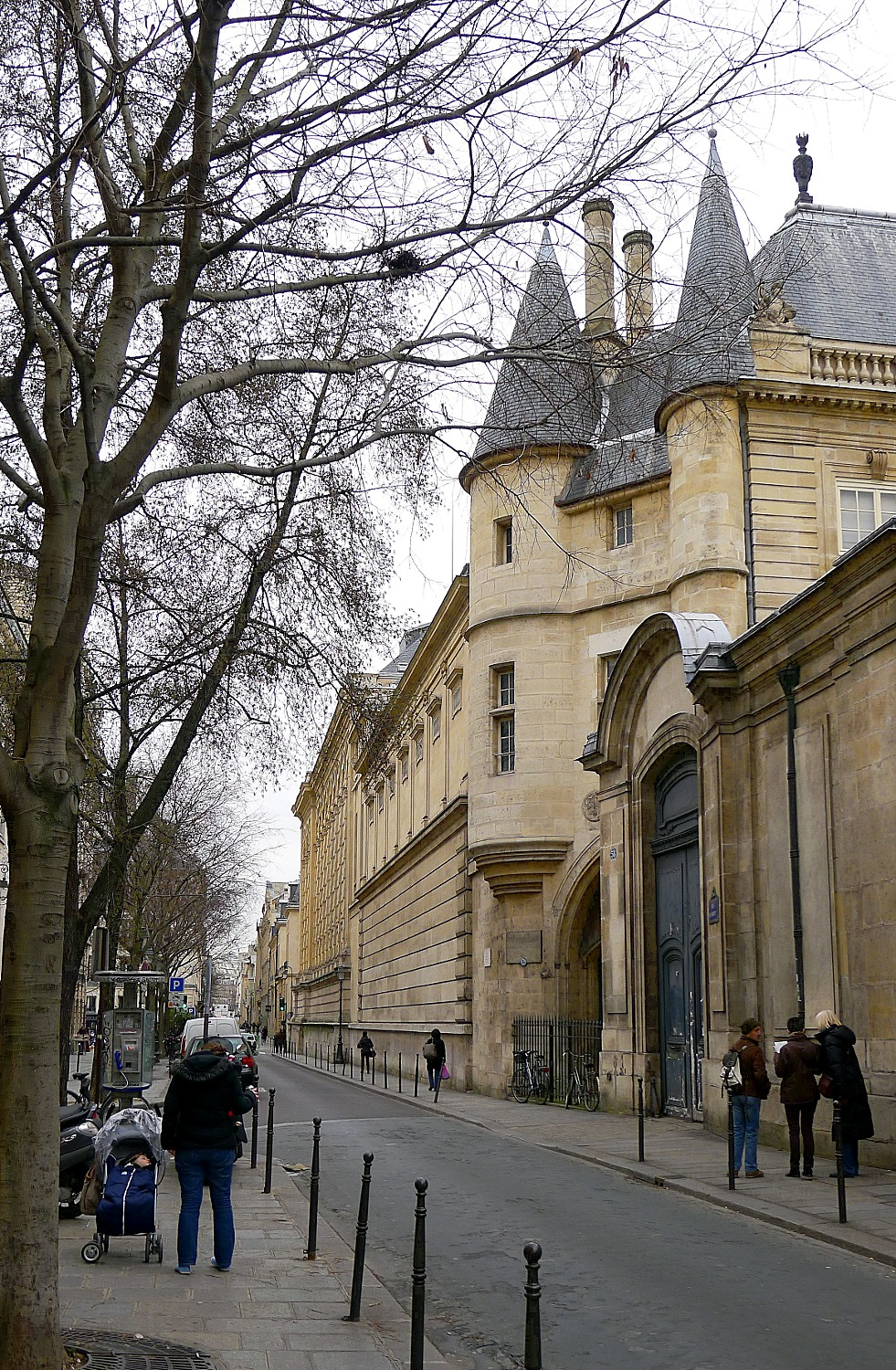
Rue des Archives at the level of the Hôtel de Soubise

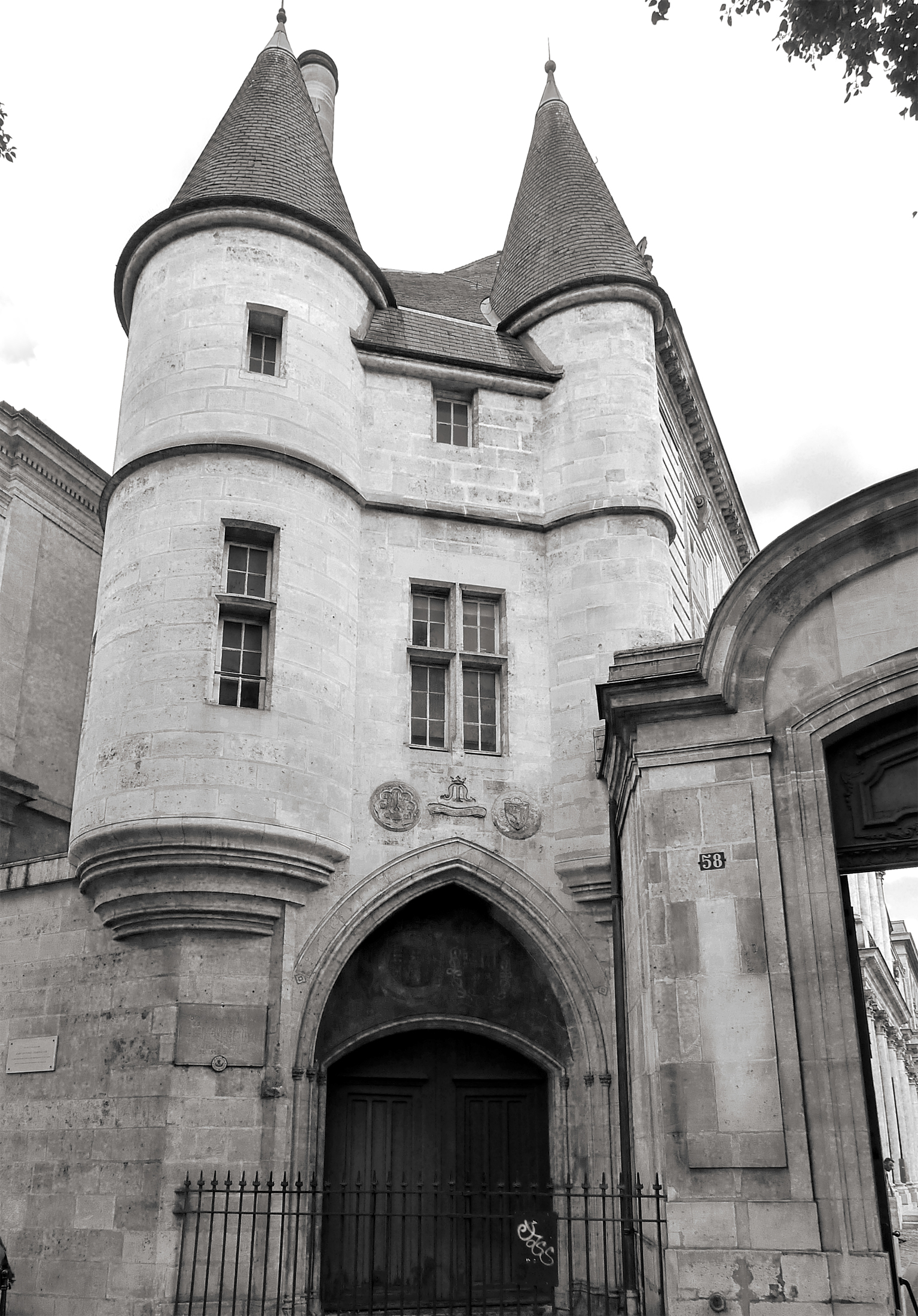
Hôtel de Soubise
- No 60: Hôtel de Guénégaud or "Hôtel de l'Hermitage".
- No 62: Hôtel de Mongelas, Musée de la Chasse et de la Nature (Museum of Hunting and Nature).
- No 68: Hôtel de Refuge.
- No 70: Hôtel Montescot.
- No 72: Hôtel de Villeflix.
- No 74: Hôtel de Tallemant (or Chailloux de Jonville).
- No 76: Hôtel Le Pelletier de Souzy, Rue du Grand-Chantier.
- No 78: Hôtel de Tallard (or Amelot de Chaillou), Rue des Enfants-Rouges.
- No 80: location of the Hôpital des Enfants-Rouges which became the barracks of the Enfants-Rouges in 1808.
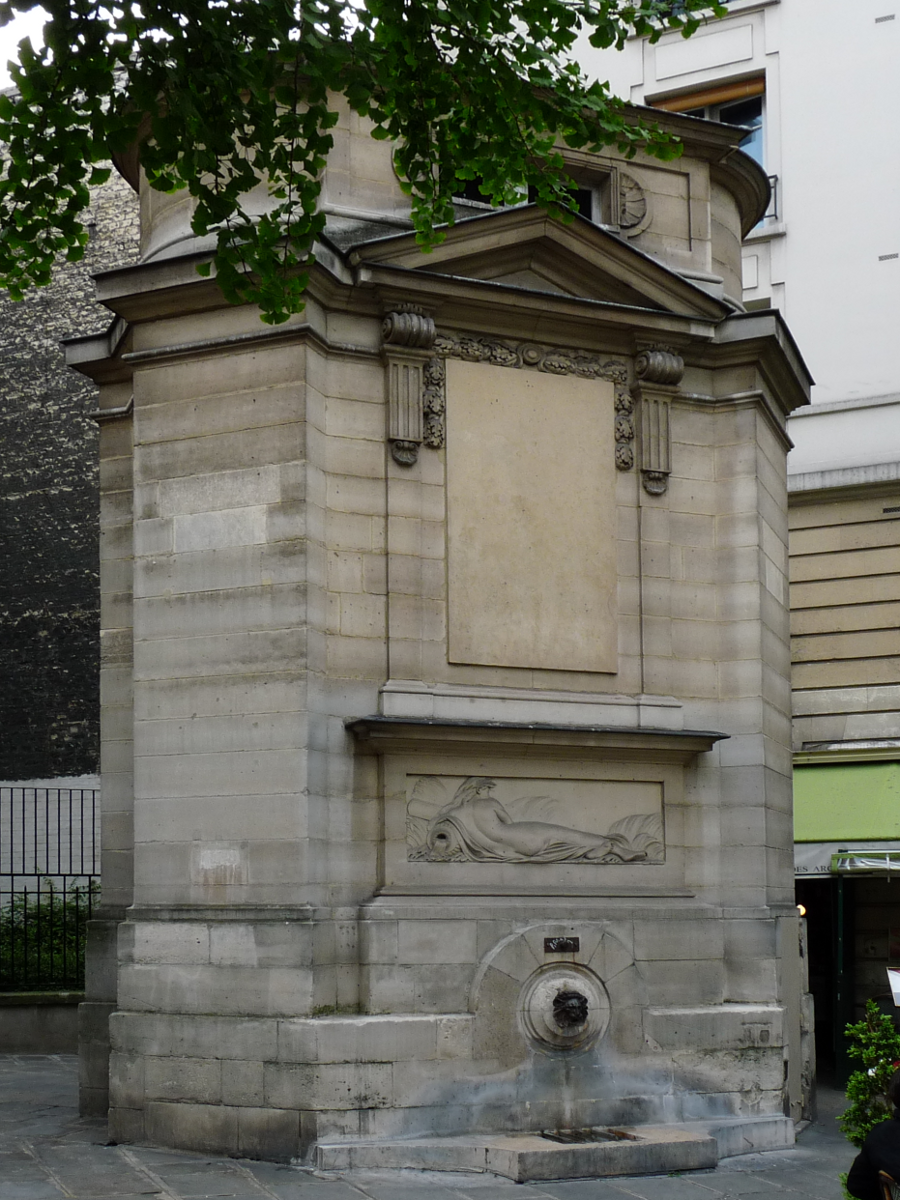
Fontaine des Haudriettes

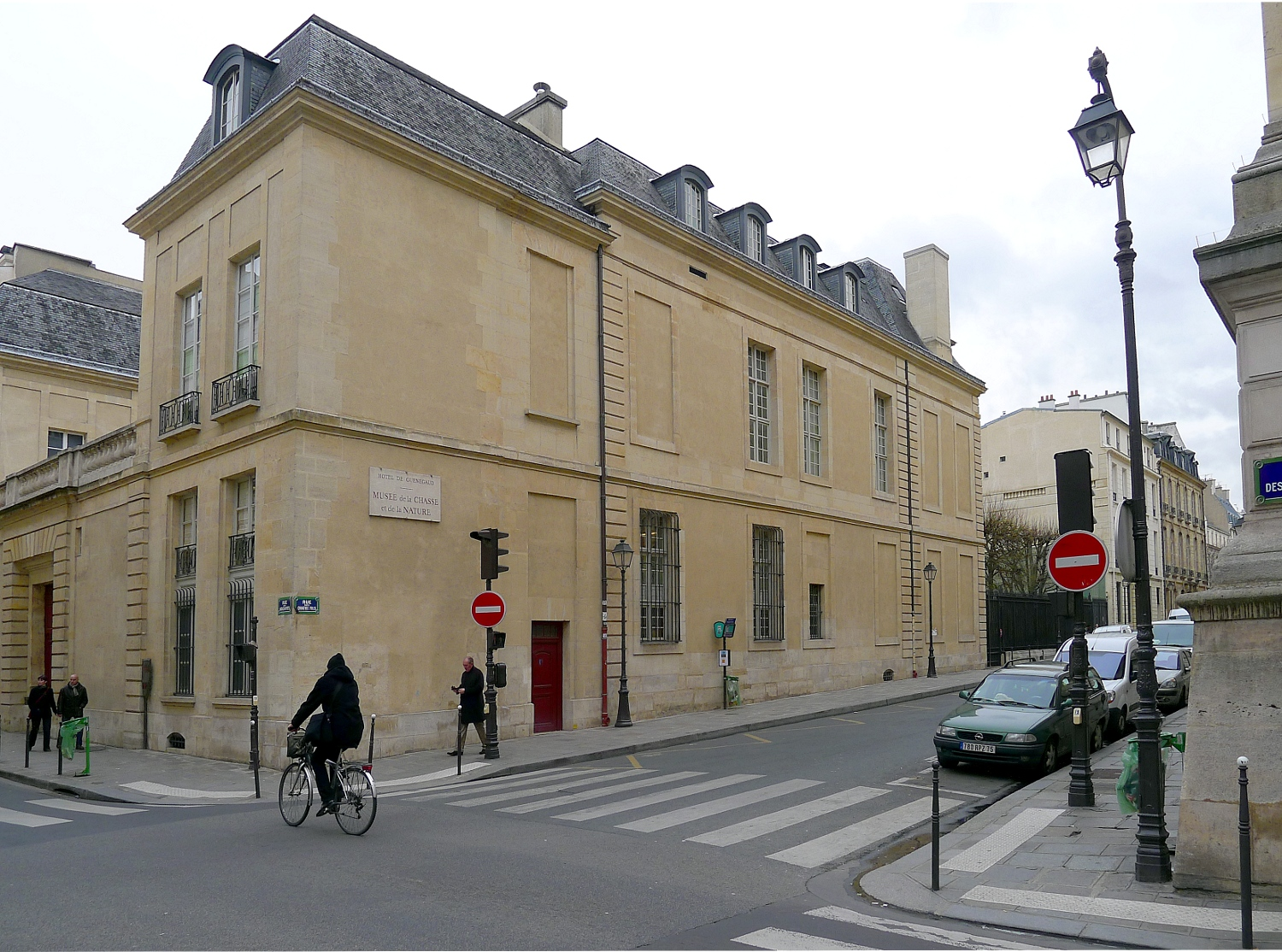
Musée de la Chasse et de la Nature

Further up the street, there are other interesting buildings, notably at nos 79, 81, 85, and 90.

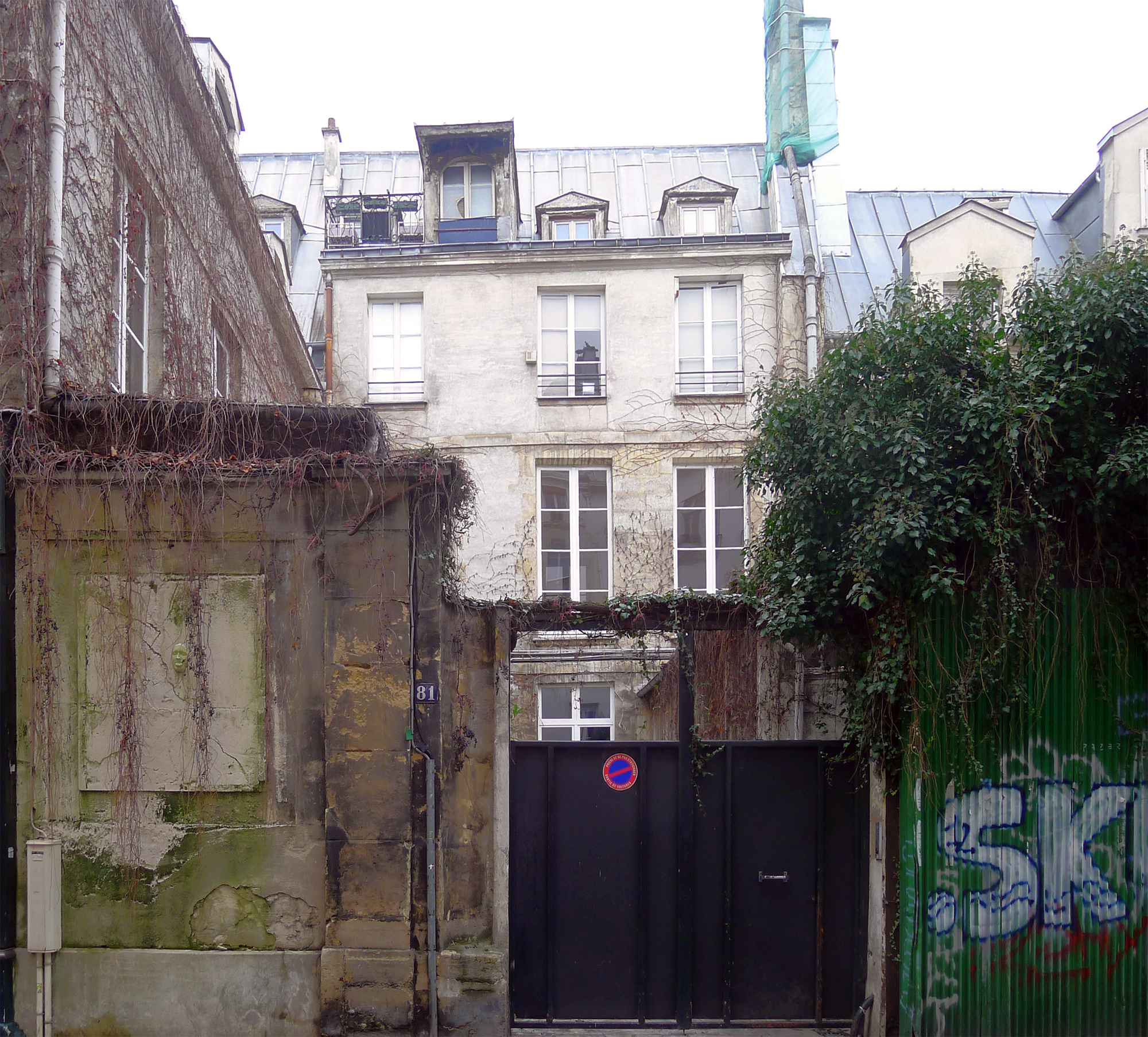
No 81

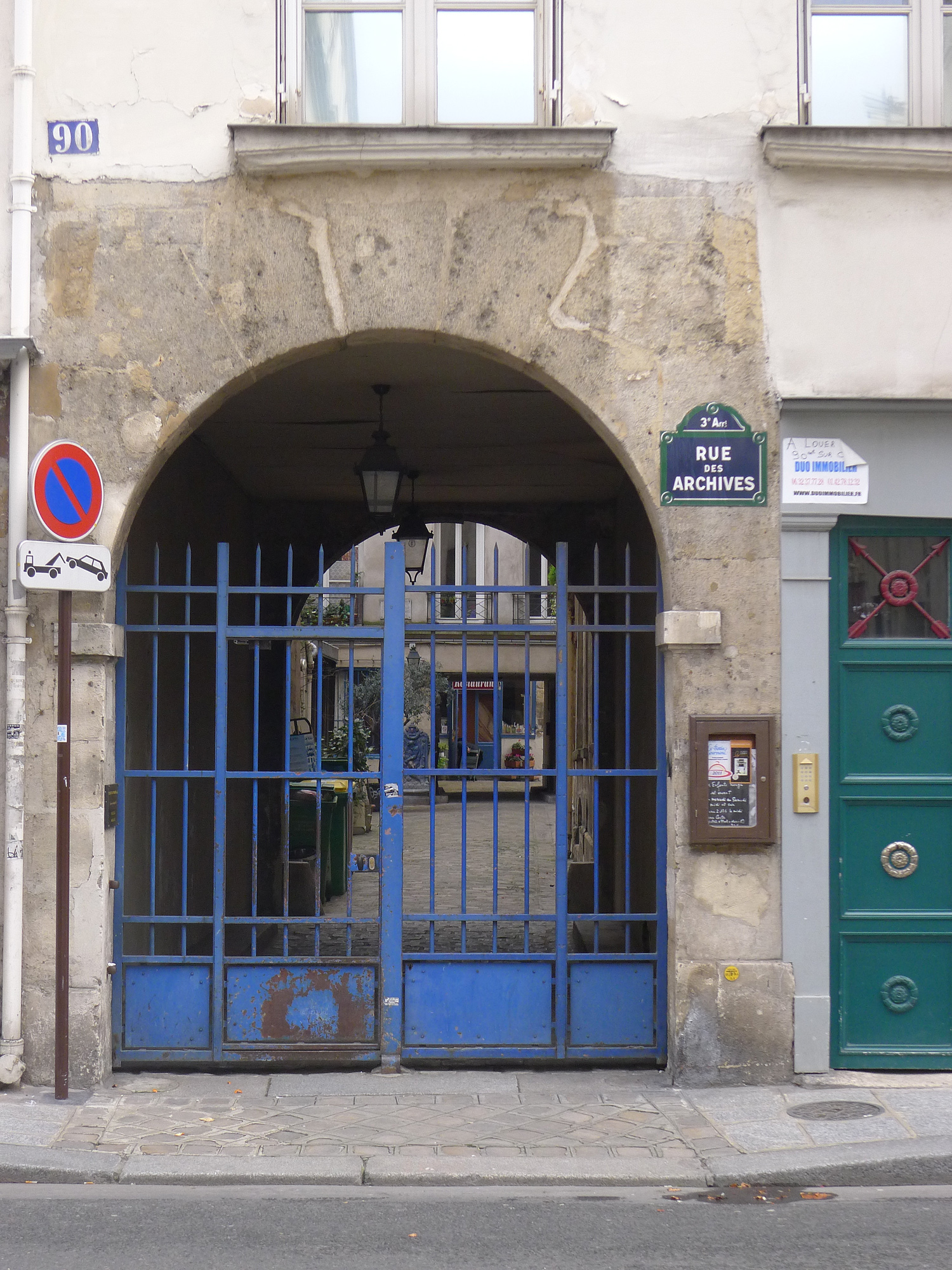
No 90

== Literature ==
In the novel Ferragus: Chief of the Devorants, by Honoré de Balzac, the widow Gruget lives at no 12 in the Rue des Enfants-Rouges. This is where Jules Desmarets listens to the conversation between his wife (Clémence Desmarets) and Ferragus XXIII.

== Bibliography ==
- Gady, Alexandre (2002). Le Marais: Guide historique et architectural. Paris: Éditions Le Passage. p. 368. ISBN 978-2847420050.
