= Place des Émeutes-de-Stonewall =

Public square in Paris, France

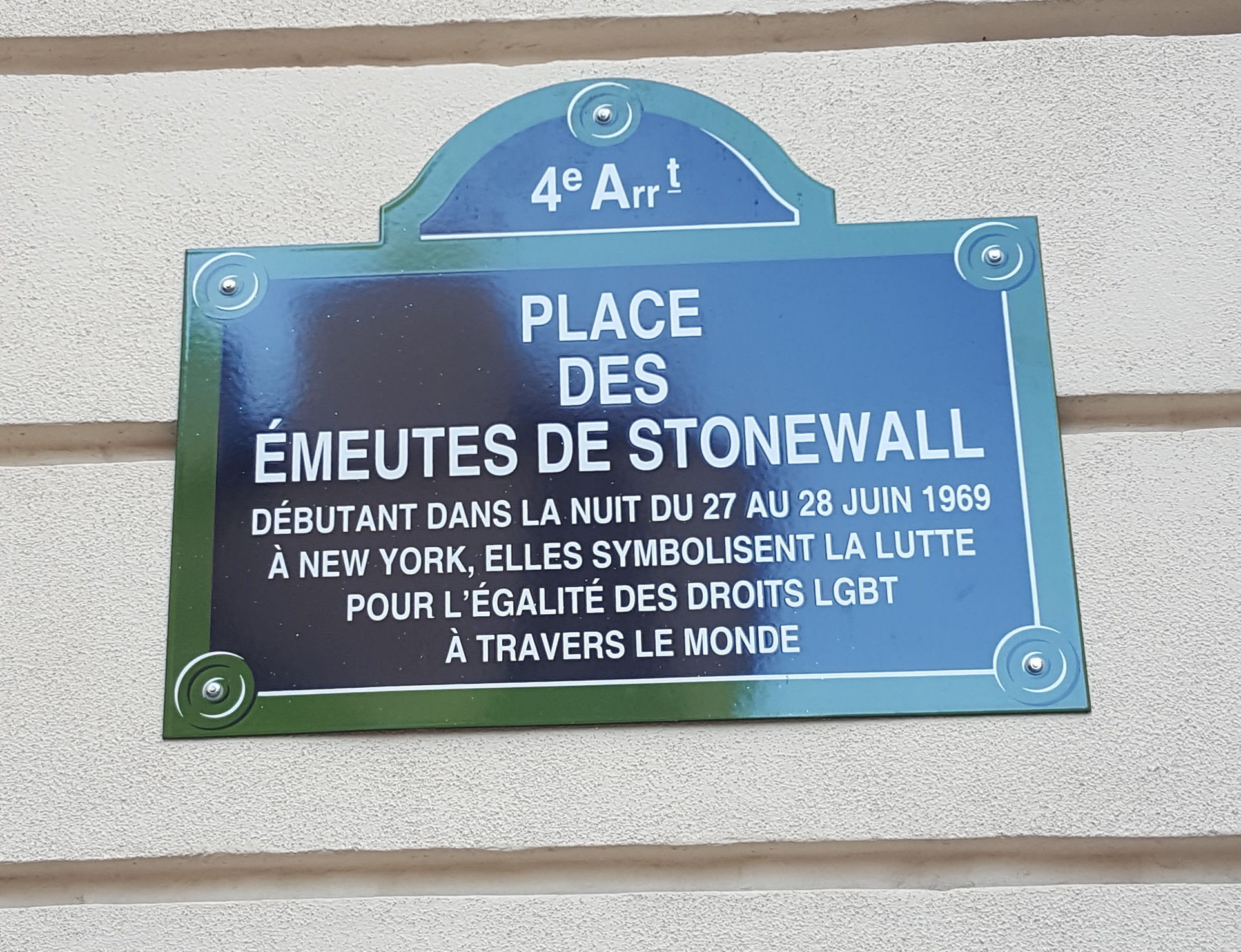
- Stonewall Riots Square, in Paris, Le Marais

- Location within Paris
- Namesake: Stonewall riots
- Arrondissement: 4th
- Quarter: Le Marais
- Coordinates: 48°51′29″N 2°21′16″E

Construction
- Denomination: 2019

The Place des Émeutes-de-Stonewall (French pronunciation: [plas dez‿emøt də stonwɔl]) is a public square in Paris, France.

== History ==
For the 50th anniversary of the Stonewall Riots, the City of Paris named a square to pay homage to the riots. The new square was inaugurated by French officials on 19 June, with Stuart Milk and several Stonewall Inn activists.

The square is the main entrance of Italian delicatessen Eataly. A Marc O'Polo boutique is also situated in the square.

== French memorial to Gilbert Baker ==
The official plaque in memory of Gilbert Baker, voted unanimously by the Council of Paris, is situated on a wall of the square.

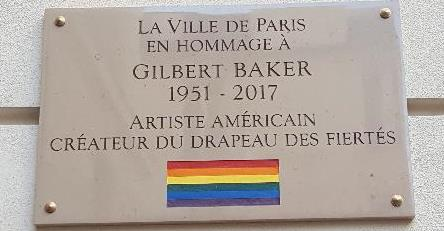
Official memorial plaque to LGBT activist Gilbert Baker

== See also ==
- Gilbert Baker (artist)
- Le Marais
- Stonewall Riots
- Place Harvey Milk
- LGBT culture in Paris
