= Gilbert Baker (artist) =

American artist and activist (1951–2017)

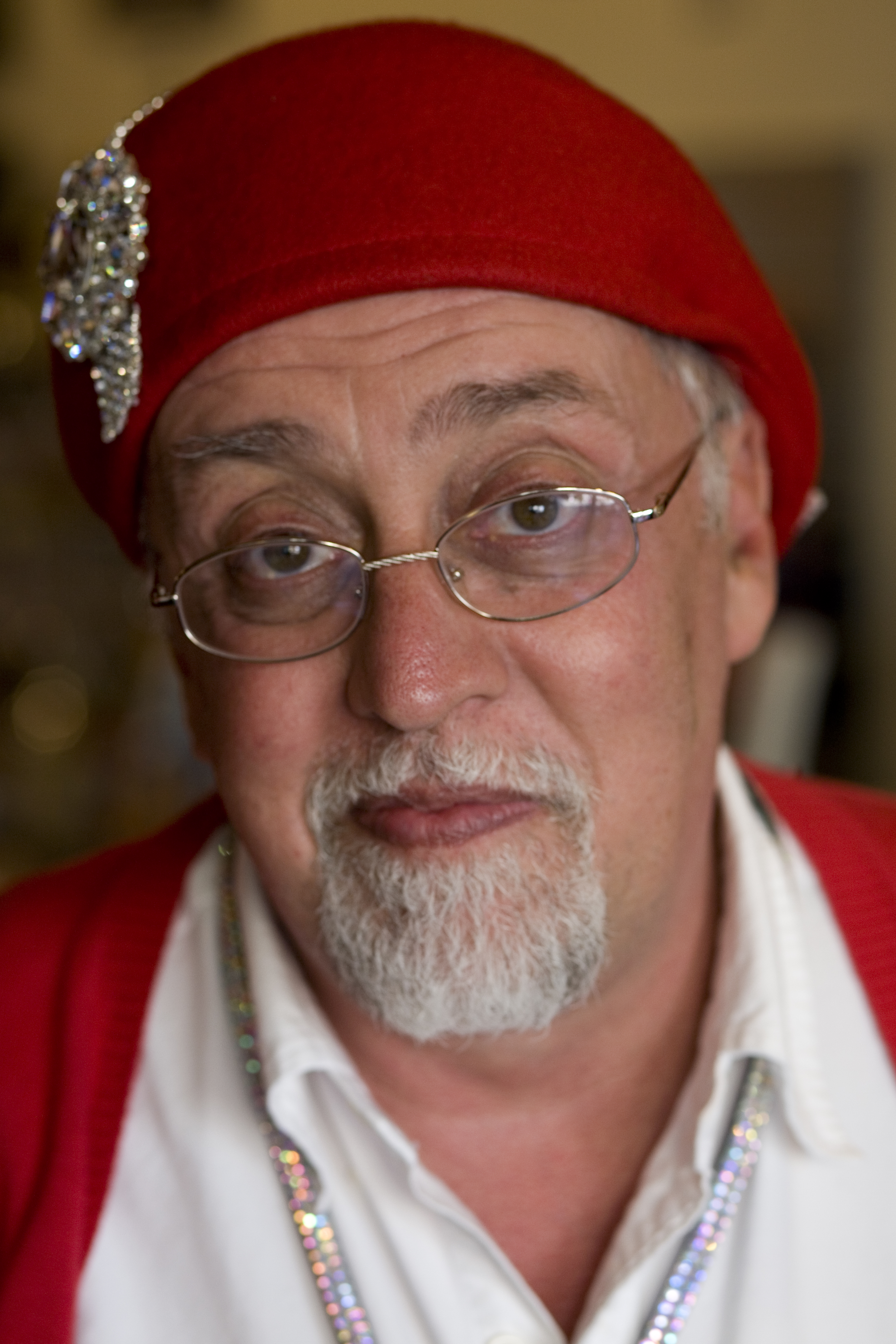
- Baker at San Francisco Pride in 2012
- Born: June 2, 1951; Chanute, Kansas, U.S.
- Died: March 31, 2017 (aged 65); New York City, U.S.
- Other name: Busty Ross
- Occupations: Gay rights activist
- Known for: Designing the rainbow flag
- Website: gilbertbaker.com

Gilbert Baker (June 2, 1951 – March 31, 2017) was an American artist, designer, activist, and vexillographer, best known as the creator of the rainbow flag.

== Biography ==
Baker was born on June 2, 1951, in Chanute, Kansas. He grew up in Parsons, Kansas, where his grandmother owned a women's clothing store. His father was a judge and his mother was a teacher. He was baptized a Methodist.

Baker served in the United States Army from 1970 to 1972. He was stationed as a medic in San Francisco at the beginning of the gay rights movement and lived there as an openly gay man. After his honorable discharge from the military, he worked on the first marijuana legalization initiative, California Proposition 19 (1972), and was taught to sew by his fellow activist, Mary Dunn. He used his skill to create banners for gay-rights and anti-war protest marches. It was during this time that he met and became friends with Harvey Milk. He also joined the gay drag activist group Sisters of Perpetual Indulgence stating, "At first it was glamorous and political, but when the Sisters became more organized, it became a tool of the right wing and raised money for Jerry Falwell", referring to video and images of the group that were used for right-wing Christian efforts, "so I stopped."

Baker first created the Rainbow Flag with a collective in 1978. He refused to trademark it, seeing it as a symbol that was for the LGBTQ community. In 1979, Baker began work at Paramount Flag Company in San Francisco, then located on the southwest corner of Polk Street and Post Street in the Polk Gulch neighborhood. Baker designed displays for Dianne Feinstein, the Premier of China, the presidents of France, Venezuela, and the Philippines, the King of Spain, and many others. He also designed creations for numerous civic events and San Francisco Gay Pride. In 1984, he designed flags for the Democratic National Convention.

In 1994, Baker moved to New York City, where he lived for the rest of his life. Here, he continued his creative work and activism. That year he created the world's largest flag (at that time) in celebration of the 25th anniversary of the 1969 Stonewall riots.

In 2003, to commemorate the Rainbow Flag's 25th anniversary, Baker created a Rainbow Flag that stretched from the Gulf of Mexico to the Atlantic Ocean in Key West. After the commemoration, he sent sections of this flag to more than 100 cities around the world. Due to his creation of the rainbow flag, Baker often used the drag queen name "Busty Ross", alluding to Betsy Ross.

Baker died at home in his sleep on March 31, 2017, at age 65, in New York City. The New York City medical examiner's office determined cause of death was hypertensive and atherosclerotic cardiovascular disease. Upon Baker's death, California state senator Scott Wiener said Baker "helped define the modern LGBT movement".

== Rainbow flag ==
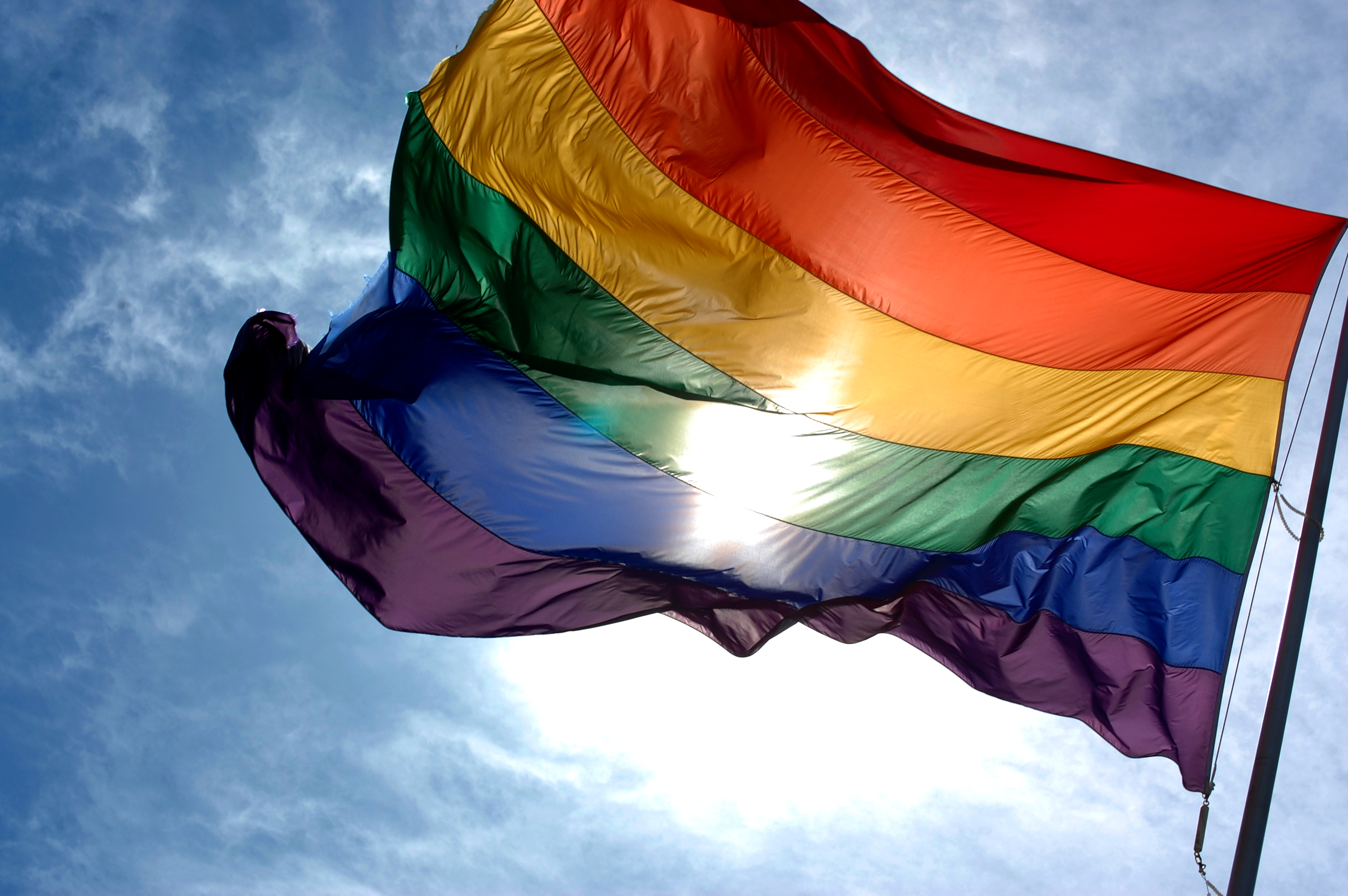
The six-color version of the pride flag is most common. The original version from 1978 featured two additional stripes—hot pink and turquoise—which were removed for manufacturing and practical reasons.

The colors on the Rainbow Flag reflect the diversity of the LGBTQ community. When Baker raised the first rainbow flags at San Francisco Pride (his group raised two flags at the Civic Center) on June 25, 1978, it comprised eight symbolic colors:

Hot pink	Sex
Red	Life
Orange	Healing
Yellow	Sunlight
Green	Nature
Turquoise	Magic/Art
Indigo	Serenity
Violet	Spirit

Thirty volunteers had helped Baker hand-dye and stitch the first two flags in the top-floor attic gallery of the Gay Community Center at 330 Grove Street in San Francisco. Because using dye in public washing machines was not allowed, they waited until late at night to rinse the dye from their clothes, running a cycle with bleach in the washing machines after leaving.

The design has undergone several revisions to remove two colors for expediency and later re-add those colors when they became more widely available. As of 2021, the most common variant consists of six stripes, with the colors red, orange, yellow, green, blue, and violet. Baker referred to this version of the flag as the "commercial version", because it came about due to practical considerations of mass production. Specifically, the rainbow flag lost its hot pink stripe when Baker approached the Paramount Flag Company to begin mass-producing them, and the hot pink fabric was too rare and expensive to include. The rainbow flag lost its turquoise stripe before the 1979 Gay Freedom Day Parade, as the committee organizing the parade wanted to fly the flag in two-halves, from the light poles along both sides of Market Street, so it became a six-striped flag with equal halves. In March 2017, just a few weeks before his death, Baker created a nine-stripe version of his original 1977 flag, with lavender, pink, turquoise and indigo stripes along with the red, orange, yellow, green and violet. According to Baker, the lavender stripe symbolizes diversity.

Towards the end of his life, Baker explained in his memoir how the Rainbow Flag came to be. He recalled that, at a dance at the Winterland Ballroom in San Francisco, he thought: "we were all in a swirl of color and light. It was like a rainbow. A rainbow. That's the moment when I knew exactly what kind of flag I would make."

Baker stated that he created the Rainbow Flag as an alternative to the pink triangle, which had originated as a Nazi concentration camp badge. He noted the community needed "something beautiful, something from us" to replace a symbol of oppression with one of pride.

== Legacy ==
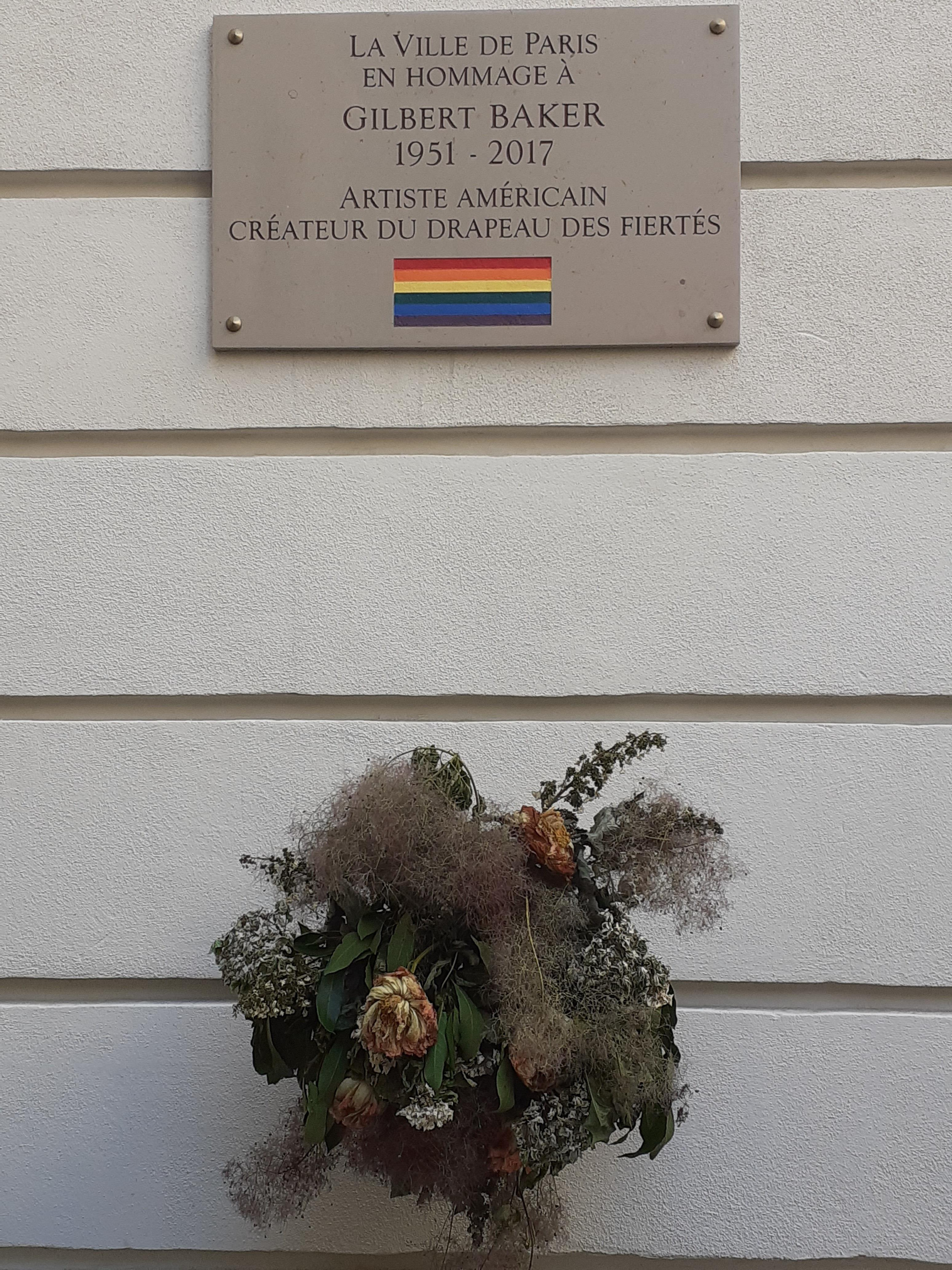
French memorial to Gilbert Baker, Place des Émeutes-de-Stonewall in Le Marais district of Paris.

In 2003, Baker and his Key West project were the subject of Rainbow Pride, a feature-length documentary by Marie Jo Ferron, bought by PBS National and debuting in New York on WNET. Baker recreated his original Rainbow Flag for the academy-award-winning 2008 film Milk, and is shown being interviewed on one of the featurettes of the DVD release.

The Museum of Modern Art ranked the rainbow flag as an internationally recognized symbol as important as the recycling symbol in 2015.

In February and early March 2017, Baker was portrayed in Dustin Lance Black's When We Rise by Jack Plotnick, and by Dylan Arnold as young Gilbert Baker. In the second part of the miniseries Baker's character is shown sewing the flag and, later on, explaining to Cleve Jones the reasoning for the colors he had chosen.

Upon Baker's death in late March 2017, California state senator Scott Wiener said Baker "helped define the modern LGBT movement".

In Baker's memory, NewFest and NYC Pride partnered with a design team to create 'Gilbert', a rainbow font inspired by the rainbow flag, first released before June 2017.

On June 2, 2017, the 66th anniversary of his birth, Google released a Google Doodle honoring Baker.

The children's book Pride: The Story of Harvey Milk and the Rainbow Flag was released by Penguin Random House in April 2018.

Baker was one of the inaugural fifty American "pioneers, trailblazers, and heroes" inducted on the National LGBTQ Wall of Honor within the Stonewall National Monument (SNM) in June 2019. The SNM is the first U.S. national monument dedicated to LGBTQ rights and history, while the Wall's unveiling at the Stonewall Inn coincided with the 50th anniversary of the Stonewall riots.

In June 2019, a square in Paris, France was officially renamed Place des Émeutes-de-Stonewall (Stonewall Riots Square), and a plaque commemorating Baker was installed at the location. The plaque was unveiled by the Paris mayor Anne Hidalgo, French officials, Stuart Milk, and activists of Stonewall riots.

In 2019, the non-profit Gilbert Baker Foundation incorporated "To protect and extend the legacy of Gilbert Baker, the creator of the LGBTQ Rainbow Flag, as an activist, artist and educator."

In 2025, the minor planet 429733 Gilbertbaker was named in his honor.

=== Museums and archives ===
Baker's work and related historical artifacts are represented in several major museum and archival collections. The GLBT Historical Society in San Francisco owns one of the sewing machines Baker used to produce the original rainbow flags in 1978, along with one of the limited-edition recreations of the eight-stripe design he produced to mark the 25th anniversary of the flag. In 2012, the society displayed both objects in an exhibition on the history of the flag at the GLBT History Museum which it sponsors in San Francisco's Castro District. The original rainbow flag was displayed in the Cork Public Museum in Ireland in 2026 – the first time it had been displayed outside the US.

In 2015, the Museum of Modern Art in New York City acquired examples of the rainbow flag for its design collection, where curators ranked it as an internationally recognized symbol similar in importance to the Creative Commons logo and the recycling symbol. The rainbow flag was also included in MoMA's 2025 exhibition, Pirouette: Turning Points in Design, a selection of "widely recognized design icons [...] highlighting pivotal moments in design history," such as the Bean Bag chair, the NASA Worm insignia, and Milton Glaser's I ❤ NY logo.
