= Africa Basel =

Art fair in Basel, Switzerland

Africa Basel Contemporary African Art Fair
- Industry: Art
- Founded: 2025; 1 year ago in Basel, Switzerland
- Founders: Sven Eisenhut; Benjamin Füglister
- Products: Art fairs

Africa Basel, or the Africa Basel Contemporary African Art Fair, is a contemporary art fair of African art taking place in Basel, Switzerland during Art Basel week.

== History ==
Africa Basel was founded by Photo Basel founding director Sven Eisenhut and artist Benjamin Füglister in order to provide a space for African art during Art Basel week, as well as to address the structural inequalities faced by African artists despite rising demand for African art.

Both hailing from and working in Basel, the two figured to establish Africa Basel in their hometown where it could derive power from the city's existing position as a "global art hub," as well as Art Basel's influence. The art fair's inaugural year was 2025.

== Curatorial board ==
- Azu Nwagbogu
- Michèle Sandoz
- Serge Tiroche
- Dr. Greer Valley
