= Rae Heint =

Australian artist and painter

- Occupation: Artist

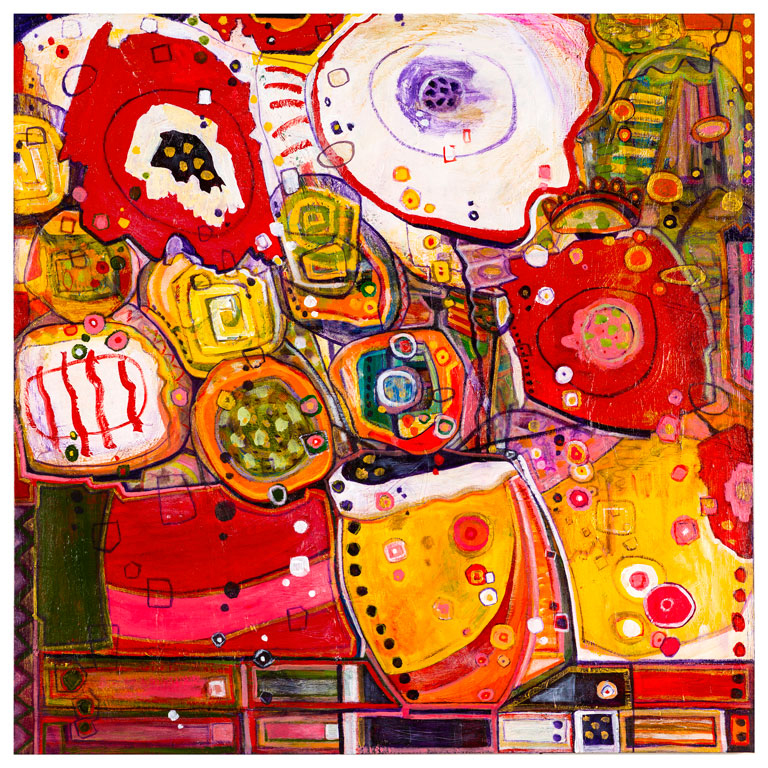
RAE HEINT FLOWERS

Rae Heint is an Australian artist and painter.

== Early life ==
Rae Heint grew up with only her parents in the Australian Desert at an isolated outback station called Mentor, in South Australia. The outstation, Mentor, now part of the Woomera Prohibited Area and rocket range is so remote that it was supplied by Afghani Cameleer camel train. It was in these formative years, in the isolation of the Australian desert that is the inspiration for her artistic work. The stories of the people of the desert, her father and the colors from the harsh desert landscape filled her mind from an early age. Her adult life saw Rae move to the great cities of the world, such a New York and Tokyo where she studied urban landscapes under the tuition of the New York Studio School under Graham Nickson. Rae has exhibited internationally through various galleries and Art fairs. Rae's bold and colorful paintings are the result of a 40-year career as a professional artist.

=== Abstract Expressionism ===
Rae had success in her artistic career as an abstract expressionist from the 1970s to the end of the century. She won various regional art prizes, such as the Victor Harbour Art Prize, the Tea Tree Gully fair. Rae also held exhibitions in Adelaide with the Historic South Australian Royal Society of Arts of which she became a fellow in addition to later exhibitions with Galleries such as Greenhill Galleries.

=== Upbeat Neopop ===
In the late 1990s Rae Heint, after studying with the New York Studio School began to develop her Artistic Style to Upbeat Neopop, The antitheses of Superflat and an evolution of Neopop. The popularity of Upbeat Neopop grew with her solo exhibitions in Ginza Tokyo Japan. Rae Heint currently successfully participates in international art fairs such as Art Stage Singapore captained by Lorenzo Rudolf and Art Taipei focusing on international patrons. Her warehouse studio is in Australia in Sydney's inner west.

== Advocacy ==
Rae Heint was a representative on the Woman's Council for Woman in Art in South Australia 2001-2005.
