= Basel Social Club =

Annual exhibition in Basel, Switzerland

- Industry: Art
- Founded: 2022; 4 years ago in Basel, Switzerland
- Founders: Robbie Fitzpatrick; Hannah Weinberger; Jean-Claude Freymond-Guth; Yael Salomonowitz; Dominik Müller
- Products: Art fairs

Basel Social Club is an annual exhibition in Basel, Switzerland that runs concurrently with Art Basel week. Highly site-specific and experimental in its curated work, the annual exhibition frequently changes venues in order to accommodate its different themes. Atypical in its approach to the art fair, it has been seen as a more accessible, communal, and open event during Art Basel.

== History ==
In 2022, artist Robbie Fitzpatrick wanted to start a new project, rather than participate in traditional Art Basel art fairs. Ultimately, he decided to work with Hannah Weinburger, Jean-Claude Freymond-Guth, Yael Salomonowitz, and Dominik Müller to launch something new for Art Basel, which would later become Basel Social Club.

== Venues ==
The first edition of Basel Social Club thus happened during Art Basel week in 2022 in an abandoned estate on Bruderholz Hill. It was assembled by artists, gallerists, and curators looking to create "everything the art fair isn’t: communal, egalitarian, free and radically open to the public. No VIP lists, no special treatment—just a pulsing crowd moving through installations and performances with drinks in hand."

In 2023, it was hosted in a former mayonnaise factory with siloes. The venue's owner had attended the first edition of Basel Social Club and recommended it for the following year.

In 2024, it was hosted in a field in Bruderholz, on the outskirts of Basel, with a natural, open air, farm theme.

In 2025, it was hosted in a building which was formerly a private bank. The exhibition's theme was "value, exchange, and trade" and featured artists and galleries like Harlesden High Street, Kendra Jayne Patrick, Anthea Hamilton, and Daniel Jasper.
