= Noah Horowitz =

American art historian

- Born: 1979 (age 46–47); United States
- Education: University of Virginia (BA) Courtauld Institute of Art (PhD)
- Occupations: CEO, Art Basel

Noah Horowitz (born 1979) is an American art historian and the CEO of Art Basel since 2022. Horowitz was previously at Sotheby’s as Worldwide Head of Gallery & Private Dealer Services, and held the post of Director Americas at Art Basel from 2015 to 2021. He has a Ph.D. in art history from the Courtauld Institute of Art in London and is the author of Art of the Deal: Contemporary Art in a Global Financial Market, published by Princeton University Press in 2011 and released as a paperback in 2014.

== Career ==
Horowitz was born in Princeton, New Jersey in 1979. He graduated from The Lawrenceville School in 1998 and in 2002 received a B.A. degree in Art History with Economics from the University of Virginia, where he was an Echols Scholar. He continued on at the Courtauld Institute of Art in London for his M.A. (2003) and Ph.D. degrees (2006).

While finishing the doctorate, Horowitz worked as an associate at the Serpentine Gallery in London where he was mentored by its co-director Hans Ulrich Obrist. He moved to New York in 2010 and joined the team behind the first online-only art fair, VIP. The following year, he was hired as the Managing Director of The Armory Show in New York and became its overall head in 2012. Horowitz is widely credited with revitalizing the art fair, which had been losing gallery participation in the years leading up to his hire.

In July 2015, Art Basel, led by Marc Spiegler, announced they had hired Horowitz as its Director Americas, putting him in charge of Art Basel’s annual December edition in Miami Beach. Horowitz oversaw the transformation of the Miami fair and firmly established Art Basel’s presence in the United States and New York more broadly. His initiatives included the launch of the Global Art Market report, written by the economist Clare McAndrew.

In 2021, Horowitz moved to Sotheby’s, taking on the newly created position of Worldwide Head of Gallery & Private Dealer Services. During his tenure, Horowitz founded Artist’s Choice, a new sale that enables artists to consign work directly to auction.

Horowitz returned to Art Basel as CEO in November 2022, succeeding Global Director Marc Spiegler.

== Other roles ==
Horowitz has written and lectured widely on art and economics. His texts and commentary have appeared in publications including The New York Times, Financial Times, Texte zur Kunst and The Art Newspaper. His book, Art of the Deal: Contemporary Art in a Global Financial Market, was published by Princeton University Press in 2011 and released as a paperback in 2014.

== Personal life ==
Horowitz lives in Brooklyn, New York. He is married to fellow art historian Louise Sorensen and together they have two kids.
