= Marc Spiegler =

American journalist

- Born: 1968 (age 57–58); Oxford, UK
- Education: Haverford College
- Occupations: Global Director, Art Basel

Marc Spiegler (born 1968) is a French-American art journalist and columnist who served as global director of Art Basel from 2012 to 2022. He is ranked in ArtReview's Power 100 among the top 25 most influential individuals in the art world.

== Early life and education ==
A citizen of France, Spiegler studied Political Science in the United States at Haverford College between 1986 and 1990, and attended the Medill School of Journalism at Northwestern University from 1992 to 1994, earning a Masters of Journalism.

== Career ==
Spiegler has been a freelance art journalist and columnist since 1998, writing for such magazines and newspapers as The Art Newspaper, Monopol, Art+Auction, ARTnews, Neue Zürcher Zeitung, and New York. He has also served as moderator and panelist at various symposiums and round tables.

He joined MCH Group (parent company of Art Basel) as a co-director in 2007. In 2012, he succeeded Sam Keller as global director. In November 2022, he stepped down and was replaced by Noah Horowitz. During his tenure, Art Basel grew from two to four fairs (Hong Kong and Paris added), from twenty-two to more than a hundred employees, and James Murdoch became a strategic investor. The success of Art Basel's international development strategy was criticized by Art Cologne director Daniel Hug who saw it as a form of (Swiss-driven) corporate colonialism on the art world. The shift from Fiac to Art Basel +Paris was also a controversial issue managed during his tenure.

== Other activities ==
- Superblue, Member of the Board of Directors (since 2023)

== Awards ==
- #38 in ArtReview's Power 100 people in 2019 in the contemporary art world
