= Art Stage Singapore =

Art fair held between 2011 and 2019

Art Stage Singapore was an annual contemporary art fair held every January in Singapore, focusing on Southeast Asian art.

== History ==
Art Stage Singapore was founded by Lorenzo Rudolf. Rudolf initially rejected a proposal to launch Art Basel in Singapore in 1992 but later revisited the idea of creating a unique Asian art fair. The fair took nine years to be realized. The first edition was held in 2011 at Marina Bay Sands.

The cancellation of the 2019 edition of the fair, which was a commercial decision, left the future of the fair in doubt. The National Arts Council, Singapore Tourism Board, and Economic Development Board, who supported the fair since its inception in 2011, released a joint statement after the cancellation expressing their disappointment.
