= Katharina Grosse =

German painter (born 1961)

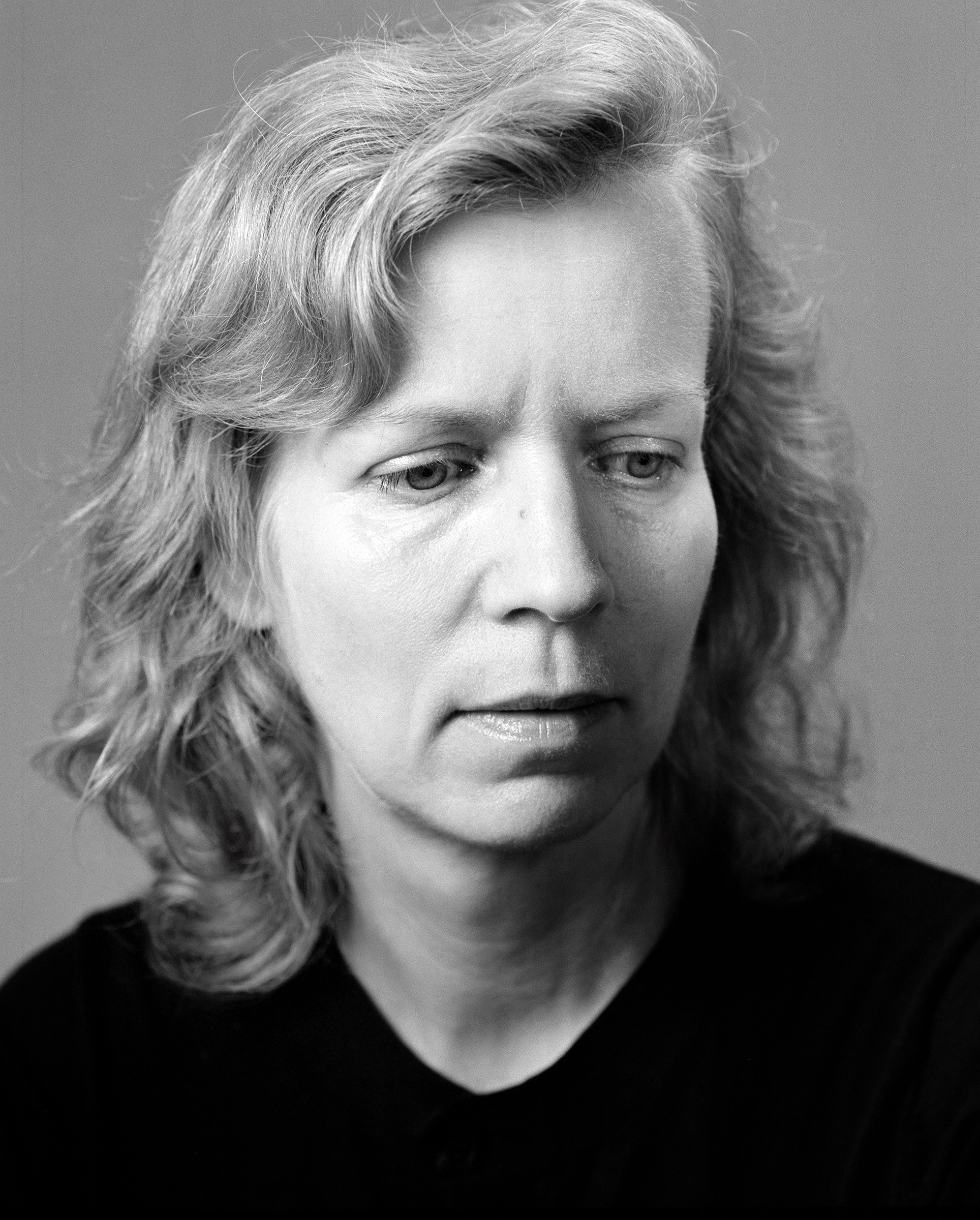
- Katharina Grosse photographed by Oliver Mark, Berlin 2011
- Born: 2 October 1961 (age 65); Freiburg im Breisgau, Germany
- Education: Kunstakademie Münster; Kunstakademie Düsseldorf
- Known for: Painting
- Website: www.katharinagrosse.com

Katharina Grosse (born 2 October 1961) is a German visual artist. She is known for her large-scale, site-related installations to create immersive visual experiences. Grosse's work employs a use of architecture, sculpture, and painting. She has been using an industrial paint-sprayer to apply prismatic swaths of color to a variety of surfaces since the late 1990s, and often uses bright, unmixed sprayed-on acrylic paints to create both large-scale sculptural elements and smaller wall works.

== Early life and education ==
Grosse was born in 1961 in Freiburg im Breisgau, Germany, but grew up in the Ruhr region, where her artist mother and linguist father exposed her to theater and dance from a young age.

Grosse studied at the Kunstakademie Münster from 1982 to 1986, and Kunstakademie Düsseldorf from 1986 to 1990. In subsequent years, she completed artist-in-residence programs at the Villa Romana in Florence, Italy (1992); Chinati Foundation in Marfa, USA (1999); Elam School of Fine Art in Auckland, New Zealand (2001); and Headlands Center for the Arts in San Francisco, USA (2002).

== Work ==
Grosse maintains studios in Berlin's Moabit district (since 2008), Auckland and Groß Kreutz (since 2020).

In 2004, Grosse sprayed the bedroom of her Düsseldorf flat — including the bed, floor and the clothes, books and shoes strewn across it — in rainbow-hued acrylics. More monumental interventions followed, including in 2015, when she installed three massive trees in the Museum Wiesbaden’s neoclassical hall, their paint-drenched roots dazzlingly exposed. Rockaway (2016), a project with MoMA PS1, saw Grosse thickly spray painting an abandoned US Army bathhouse and part of the surrounding beach on New York’s Rockaway peninsula.

=== Commissions ===
Grosse has been commissioned with various site-specific installations, including for the Federal Labour Court in Erfurt (1999) Gate 122 of Terminal 1 at Toronto Pearson International Airport in Toronto (2003), the German Parliament in Berlin (2015) and the Messeplatz at Art Basel (2025).

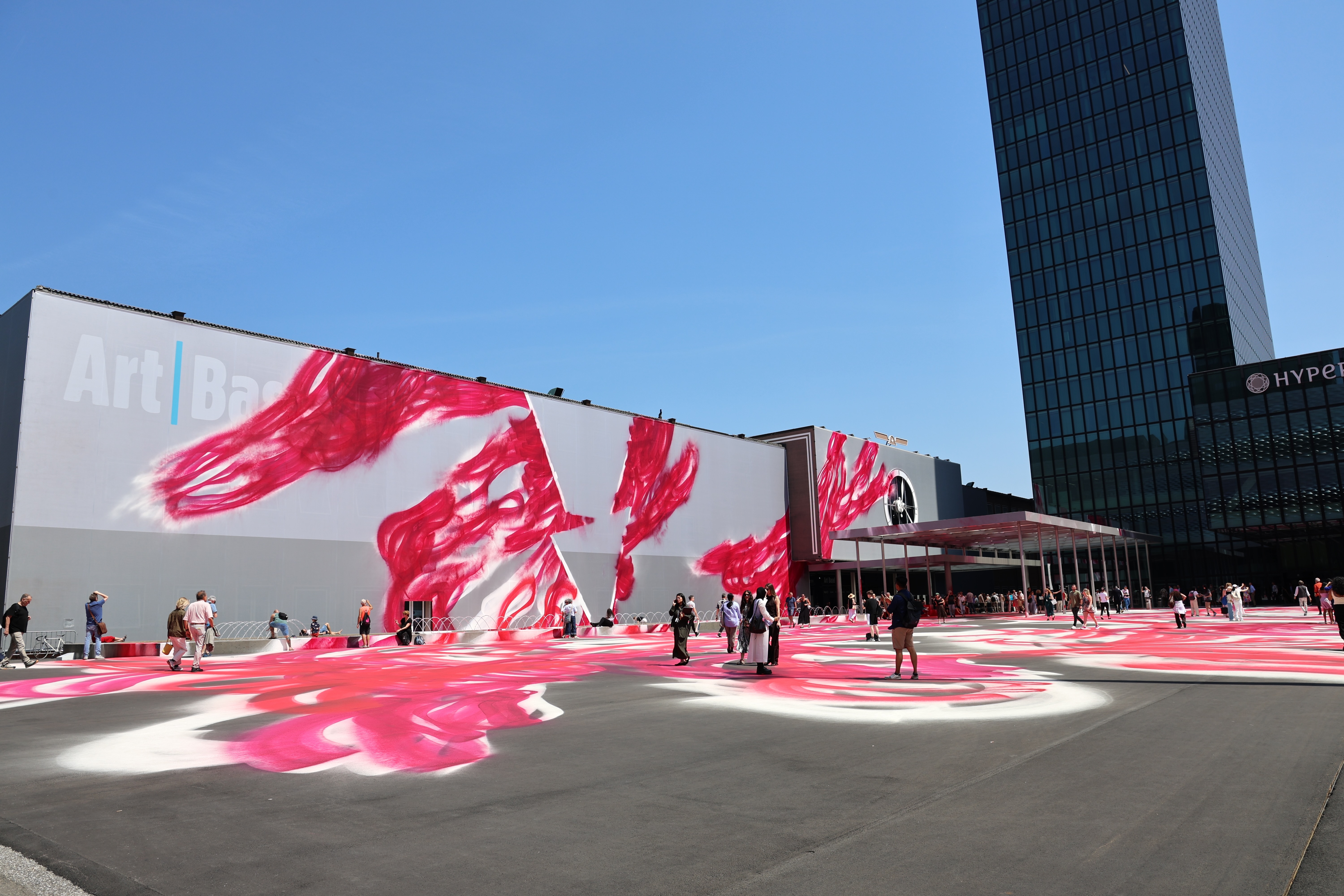
Messeplatz with CHOIR installation by Katharina Grosse at Art Basel 2025

=== Other activities ===
Grosse taught at the Weißensee Academy of Art from 2000 to 2010. She was a professor of painting at the Kunstakademie Düsseldorf from 2010 to 2018. She was a member of the juries that selected Hito Steyerl as recipient of the Käthe Kollwitz Prize (2019) and Sheela Gowda of the Maria Lassnig Prize (2019).

Since 2021, Grosse has been chairing the board of KW Institute for Contemporary Art. In this capacity, she was part of the search committee that chose Emma Enderby as the KW's new director in 2023.

== Art market ==
Grosse is represented by Galerie Max Hetzler (since 2022) and Gagosian Gallery (since 2017). She previously worked with Johann König until 2022.

== Personal life ==
Grosse is in a relationship with artist Judy Millar. She has been living and working in Berlin since 2000. In 2005, she purchased a former supermarket in Berlin's Friedrichshain district and turned it into her primary residence.

== Public commissions (selected) ==
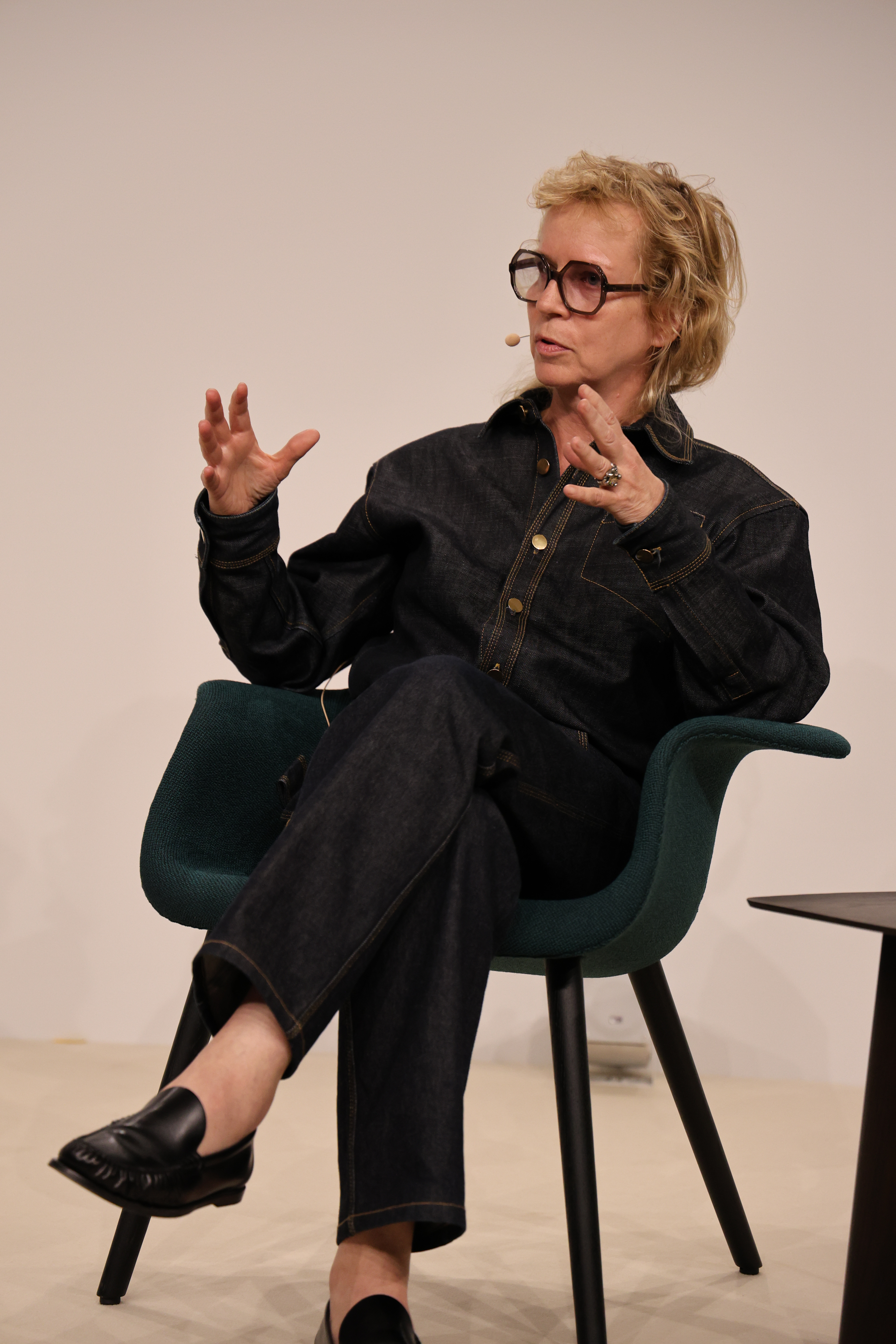
Katharina Grosse speaking at Art Basel 2025, where she was commissioned to create CHOIR

- Untitled, Greater Toronto Airports Authority (2003)
- Seven Days Time, Kunstmuseum Bonn (2011)
- Blue Orange, Vara Bahnhof, Sweden (2012 design)
- Just Two Of Us, MetroTech Commons, Public Art Fund, New York (2013)
- Untitled, Ehrenhof Düsseldorf (2014)
- Untitled, The Cologne Public Transport Company - KVB, stop Chlodwigplatz, Cologne (2015)
- Untitled, Marie-Elisabeth-Lüders-Haus, Berlin (commissioned by Federal Republic of Germany for House of Representatives) (2015)
- Untitled, Washington University in St. Louis, MO, USA (commissioned by the Gary M. Sumers Recreation Center) (2016)
- Rockaway!, for MoMA PS1, Fort Tilden, NY (2016)
- Mural, for Museum of Fine Arts, Boston, MA (2019)

== Collections ==
Grosse's work is held in several permanent collections, including the following:

- Museum of Modern Art, New York
- QAGOMA, Brisbane, Australia
- Centre Georges Pompidou, Paris
- Pomeranz Collection
- Collection Société Générale

== Awards ==
- Villa Romana Prize, Florence, Italy (1992)
- Schmidt-Rottluff Stipend, Germany (1993)
- Stiftung Kunstfonds Bonn, Germany (1995)
- Chinati Foundation's artist-in-residence program, Marfa, Texas, USA (1999 )
- Artist-in-residence at Elam School of Fine Arts, Auckland, New Zealand (2001)
- Artist-in-residency award, Headlands Center for the Arts, Sausalito, California, USA (2002)
- Fred Thieler Award, Berlinische Galerie, Berlin, Germany (2003)
- Oskar-Schlemmer-Award, Great State Prize for Visual Arts of Baden-Wuerttemberg (2014)
- Otto-Ritschl-Kunstpreis (2015)

== Publications (catalogues) ==
- Location, Location, Location. Contributions by Steffen Bodekker, Roman Kurzmeyer, Judy Millar, Retrograde Strategies Cooperative, Angela Schneider, Beat Wismer, Düsseldorf 2002.
- Katharina Grosse. Kunstverein Ruhr. Contribution by Peter Friese, Essen 2002.
- Cool Puppen / Der weisse Saal trifft sich im Wald / Ich wüsste jetzt nichts. Ikon Gallery, Birmingham; Städtische Galerie im Lenbachhaus, München; Kunstmuseum St. Gallen, St. Gallen; Kunsthalle zu Kiel, Kiel. Contributions by Marion Ackermann, Beate Ermacora, Jonathan Watkins, Roland Wäspe, Wolfratshausen 2002.
- Katharina Grosse. Fred Thieler Preis für Malerei 2003. Berlinische Galerie, Berlin. Contribution by Armin Zweite, Berlin 2003.
- Infinite Logic Conference. Magasin 3 Stockholm Konsthall, Sweden. Contributions by Richard Julin, Lars Mikael Raattamaa, Stockholm 2004.
- Double Floor Painting. Kunsthallen Brandts Klaedefabrik, Denmark. Contributions by Lene Burkard, Tor Nørretranders, Cecilie Bepler, Odense 2004.
- Holey Residue. de Appel, Amsterdam. Contribution by Janneke Wesseling, Amsterdam 2006.
- Picture Park. Queensland Art Gallery/Gallery of Modern Art. Contributions by Nicholas Chambers, Robert Leonard, Brisbane 2007.
- The Poise of the Head und die anderen folgen. Kunstmuseum Bochum. Contributions by Hans Gunther Golinski and Katharina Grosse, Nuremberg 2007.
- Atoms Outside Eggs. Museu de Arte Contemporânea (Fundação de Serralves), Porto. Contributions by Leonhard Emmerling, Ulrich Loock, Porto 2007.
- Another Man Who Has Dropped His Paintbrush. Galleria Civica di Modena. Contributions by Arno Brandlhuber & Katharina Grosse, Milovan Farronato, Angela Vettese, Cologne 2008.
- The Flowershow / SKROW NO REPAP. FRAC Auvergne, Clermont-Ferrand. Contribution by Jean-Charles Vergne, Cologne 2008.
- Ich wünsche mir ein grosses Atelier im Zentrum der Stadt. Contributions by Georg Augustin, Laura Bieger, Andreas Denk, Ulrich Loock, Philip Ursprung, Baden, Switzerland 2009.
- Shadowbox. Temporäre Kunsthalle Berlin. Contributions by Laura Bieger, Katja Blomberg, Uta Degner, Antje Dietze, Alexander Koch, Gerd G. Kopper, Cologne 2009.
- Atoms Inside Balloons. The Renaissance Society at the University of Chicago, Chicago, IL, USA. Contributions by David Hilbert, Nana Last, and Hamza Walker, Chicago 2009.
- Barbara und Katharina Grosse. Museum für Neue Kunst Freiburg. Contributions by Walter von Lucadou, Isabel Herda, Nuremberg 2010.
- Transparent Eyeballs. Quadriennale 2010, Kunsthalle Düsseldorf. Contributions by Gregor Jansem, Annika Reich, Uwe Vetter, Düsseldorf 2011.
- Eat child eat. Contribution by Ulrich Wilmes, Berlin 2011.
- One floor up more highly. MASS MoCA, MA, North Adams, USA. Contribution by Susan Cross, Massachusetts, 2012.
- Wunderblock, Nasher Sculpture Center, Dallas, TX, USA. Contributions by Jeremy Strick, Catherine Craft, Dallas 2013.
- Katharina Grosse. Monograph. Contributions and published by Ulrich Loock, Annika Reich, Katharina Grosse, Cologne 2013.
- Wer, ich? Wen, Du?. Kunsthaus Graz, Austria. Contributions by Peter Pakesch, Katrin Bucher Trantow, Adam Budak, Graz 2014.
- Inside the Speaker. Museum Kunstpalast, Düsseldorf. Contributions by Dustin Breitenwischer, Philipp Kaiser, Ulrich Loock, Beat Wismer, Cologne 2014.
- psychylustro. City of Philadelphia Mural Arts Program. Contributions by Douglas Ashford, Anthony Elms, Jane Golden, Daniel Marcus, Elizabeth Thomas, Cologne 2015.
- Katharina Grosse: Seven Hours, Eight Voices, Three Trees. Museum Wiesbaden. Contributions by Ann Cotten, Dustin Breitenwischer, Jörg Daur, Alexander Klar, Sally McGrane, Teresa Präauer, Annika Reich, Monika Rinck, Cologne 2015.
- Katharina Grosse. Museum Frieder Burda. Contributions by Helmut Friedel and Katrin Dillkofer (both in German), Cologne 2016.
- Katharina Grosse: Wunderbild. Editors/Contributors: Katharina Grosse (Artist), Adam Budak (Editor), Elisabeth Lebovici, Ulrich Loock, Chantal Mouffe, Michal Nanoru. Walther König, 2018.

== See also ==
- List of German women artists
