= I Never Read, Art Book Fair =

Art book fair in Basel, Switzerland

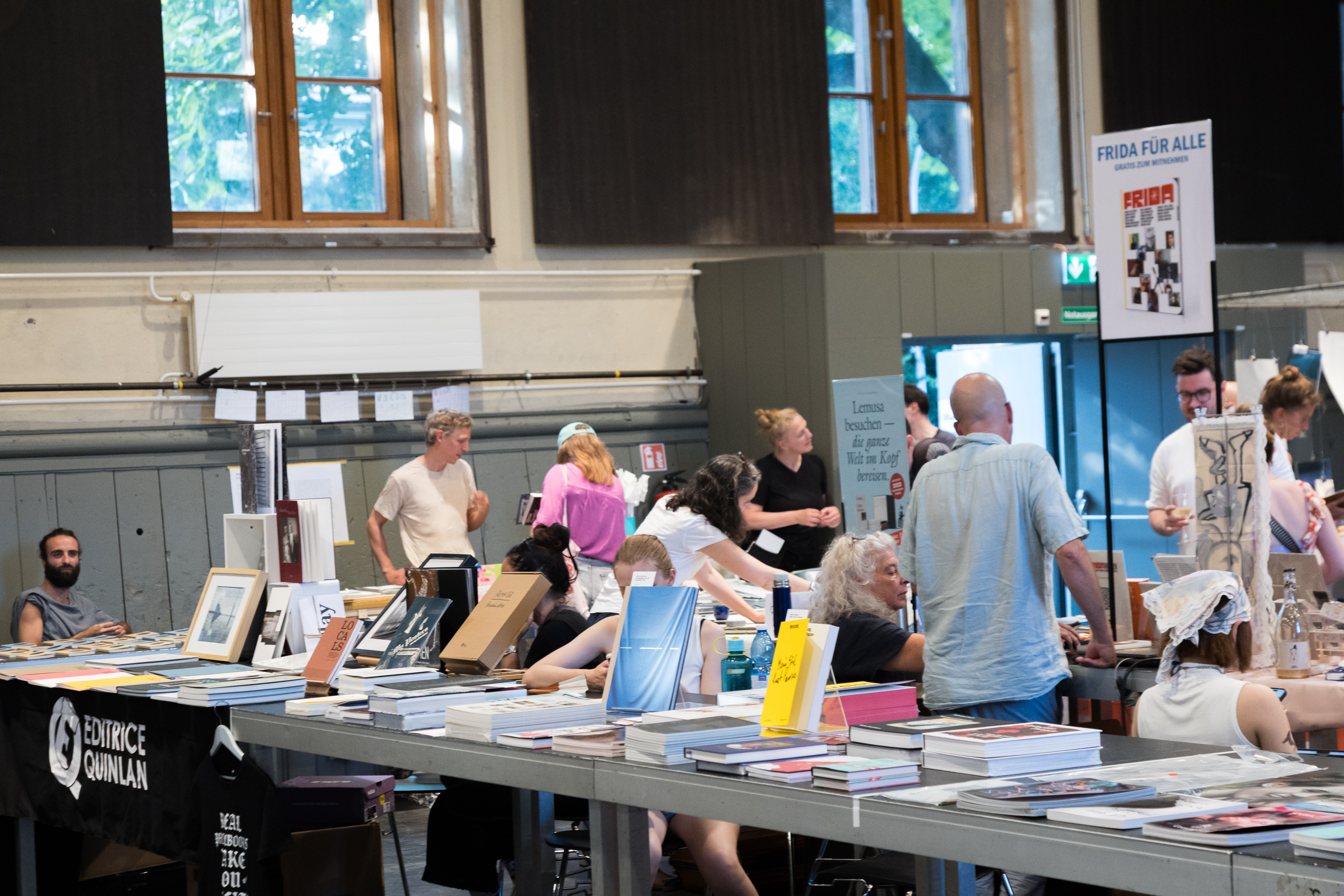
Stands during the art book fair in 2025.

The I Never Read, Art Book Fair is an art book fair hosted annually in Basel, Switzerland. It was founded by Wüthrich and Johannes Willi and debuted during Art Basel week in 2012. Located in the Kaserne Basel, its diversity of independent publishers ranges from small editors, artists featured in print publications, international magazines, and others.

Fad Magazine named it one of the fairs to see during Art Basel week in 2013.

== History ==
Both working in the arts in Basel, cofounders Eveline Wüthrich and Johannes Willi attended Art Basel in 2012 and found that there was a lack of events and programming dedicated to art books. Having met on the street, they decided on the "rather last minute idea" of starting the I Never Read, Art Book Fair to run concurrently with Art Basel week.

In 2020, I Never Read, Art Book Fair ran in September, rather than June, due to complications from the COVID-19 pandemic; that year, 59 participating artists each designed a poster to post throughout the city in anticipation.

In 2022, Art Basel partnered with many Basel art institutions, including I Never Read, Art Book Fair, in order to collectively show support and donate resources to humanitarian organizations showing solidarity to Ukraine.

The art book fair has also run in other countries, including Costa Rica and Brazil.

== Name ==
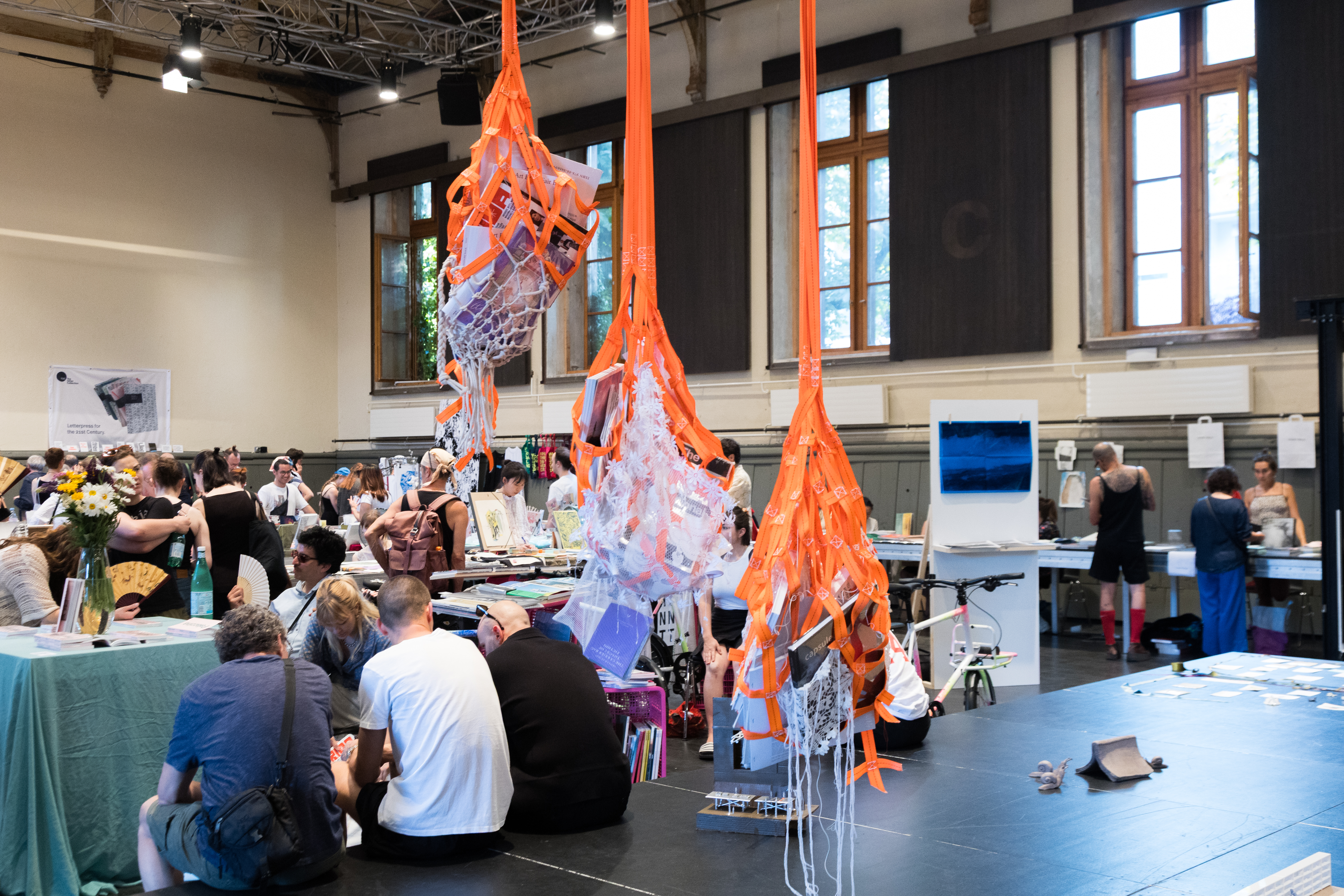
An art installation at the art book fair in 2025.

The name originated from a quote by Andy Warhol. Wüthrich and Willi had gone to the Museum für Moderne Kunst in Frankfurt, Germany to see a Warhol exhibition where they ran into the full quote and decided to employ it for the art book fair:

The title of the fair can be understood as a metaphor for a platform dedicated to exploring the relationship between text, performance, art production and the book. It presents to the audience a new artistic practice based on the production of texts – texts that we may not read, but that embody a form of knowledge.
