= MCH Group =

Switzerland based marketing company

MCH Group AG
- Type: Aktiengesellschaft
- Traded as: SIX: MCHN
- ISIN: CH0039542854
- Industry: live marketing, trade fair, events
- Founded: 2001; 25 years ago (following a merger)
- Headquarters: Basel, Switzerland
- Area served: Worldwide
- Key people: Andrea Zappia (CEO a.i. and Chairman of the Board of Directors)
- Revenue: CHF 435.7 million (2024)
- Number of employees: 1150 (2024)
- Website: www.mch-group.com

MCH Group is an international live-marketing company based in Basel, Switzerland. MCH Group's core business is staging its own fairs as well as guest events. The international art fair Art Basel is the leading exhibition of MCH Group.

== History ==
MCH Group has its roots in the "Schweizer Mustermesse", founded in 1916. In 2001, Messe Basel and Messe Zürich merged to “Messe Schweiz”. In 2009, Messe Schweiz was renamed MCH Group AG. In addition, MCH Group also comprises Expomobilia, MCH Global, and MC^{2}, as well as other holdings.

Until 2019, MCH Group hosted the annual watch and jewelry show Baselworld, which gathered all the industry players from around the world: manufacturers, buyers, retailers, collectors, media, and enthusiasts. Depending on the source, the demise of this fair is attributed to the profound upheavals of the market and its own management failures. At its peak around 2015, BASELWORLD hosted 1,500 exhibitors from 40 nations on 140,000 square meters and welcomed over 150,000 visitors.

== Organization and shareholders ==
MCH Group CEO a.i. Andrea Zappia was appointed in April 2025. The second member of the Executive Board is CFO Eleonora Gennari. In 2024, MCH Group employed around 1150 people. In the 2024 financial year, the group posted sales of CHF 435.7 million and a net profit of CHF 3 million. MCH Group is listed on the SIX Swiss Exchange. The two main shareholders Lupa Investment Holdings (41.69%) and the canton of Basel-Stadt (37.52%) hold the majority of the share capital. The Extraordinary General Meeting of August 3, 2020 approved two capital increases and the lifting of the restriction on transferability. It also agreed that Lupa Systems, an investment company controlled by James Murdoch, would become the new anchor shareholder of MCH Group with at least 30%, optionally up to 49%, and have representation on the Board of Directors.

== Field of Activity ==
The core business of MCH Group is the organization of international and national exhibitions. The exhibition portfolio comprises around 25 exhibitions that are organized and staged by MCH Group's exhibition companies. The most important exhibitions include the international art fair Art Basel, with events in Basel, Miami Beach, Paris and Hong Kong, and the Swiss exhibitions Swissbau, IGEHO, Giardina, and HOLZ. Fantasy Basel is one of many guest exhibitions. During the ESC 2025 in Basel, MCH Group will organize the Eurovision Village in Hall 1 of Messe Basel and has received funding and a deficit guarantee from the Swisslos lottery fund of the Canton of Basel-Stadt.

MCH Group also rents out its infrastructure in Basel and Zurich to external exhibition, congress and event organizers. The exhibition sites comprise an exhibition area of 162,000 m² in Basel and 33,000 m² in Zurich.

The third business field is services in the fields of strategy, conception, marketing, sponsoring, event management and stand construction.
