= Basel Town Hall =

500-year-old building in Basel, Switzerland

Coordinates: 47°33′30″N 7°35′18″E

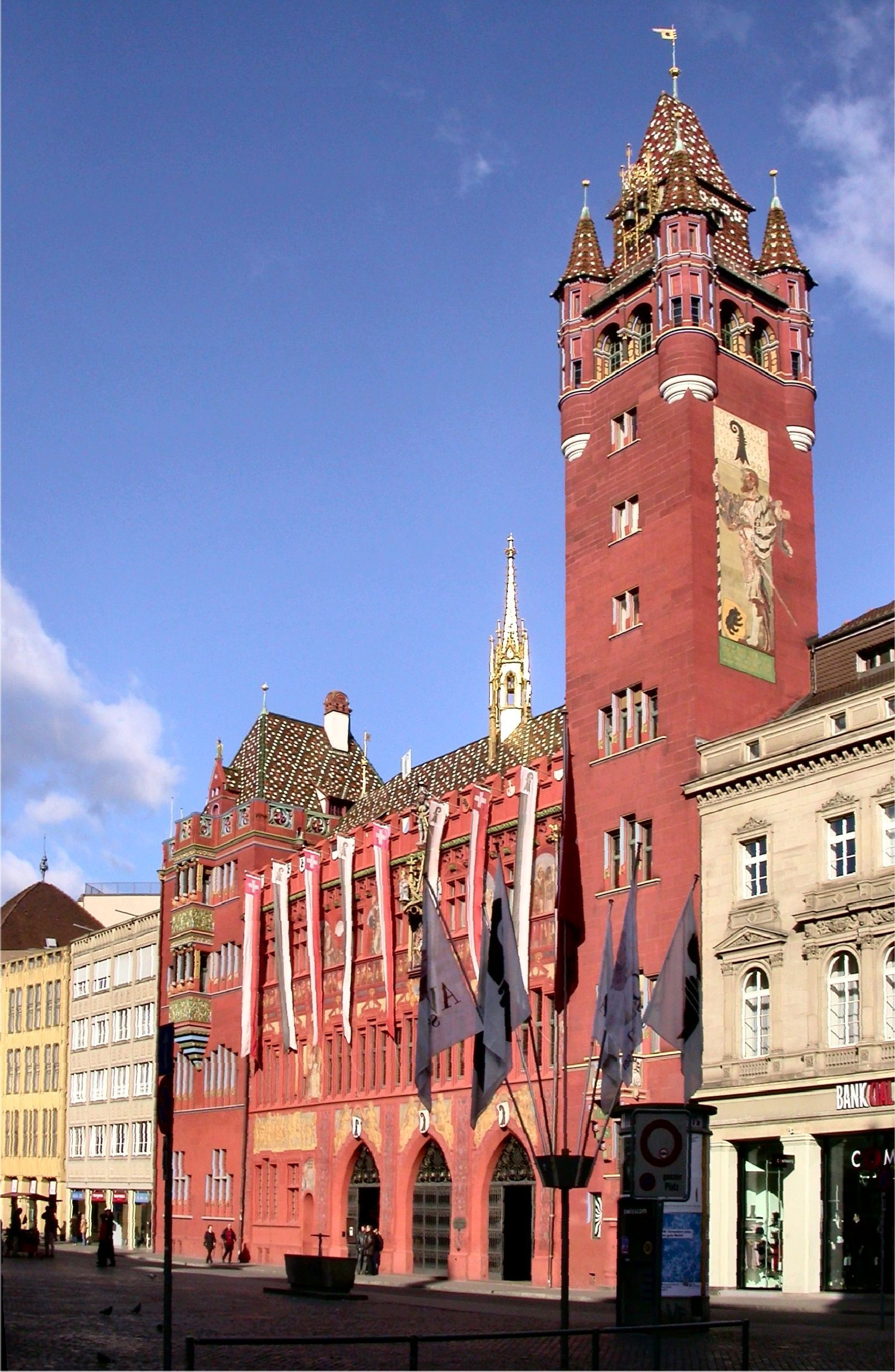
The Basel Town Hall

The Basel Town Hall (German: Rathaus Basel, locally known as Roothuus) is a 500-year-old building dominating the Marktplatz in Basel, Switzerland.

The Town Hall houses the meetings of the Cantonal Parliament as well as the Cantonal Government of the canton of Basel-Stadt.

== History ==
The so-called Richthaus was destroyed by the Basel earthquake of 1356 and all records and documents were lost. It was replaced by the “Palace of the Lords". In 1501, Basel joined the Swiss Confederation. In 1503, the Grand Council resolved to construct a new building adjoining the “Palace of the Lords” to commemorate the city’s entry into the Confederation. Construction took place from 1504 to 1514. During this time, the coats of arms of the cantons were also added to the battlements. The original “Palace of the Lords”, now situated behind the newer building, was raised in height between 1517 and 1521, when the Great Council Chamber was also established.

The Great Council Chamber at one time featured a series of frescoes painted in 1522 by Hans Holbein the Younger, which have been lost. Fragments of the work as well as some of the initial drawings are kept in the Kunstmuseum.

The German term "Rathaus" literally means "council house" while the local Basel German dialect term "Roothus" means both "council house" but also sounds like "red house", a pun with reference to the red sandstone facade of the building.

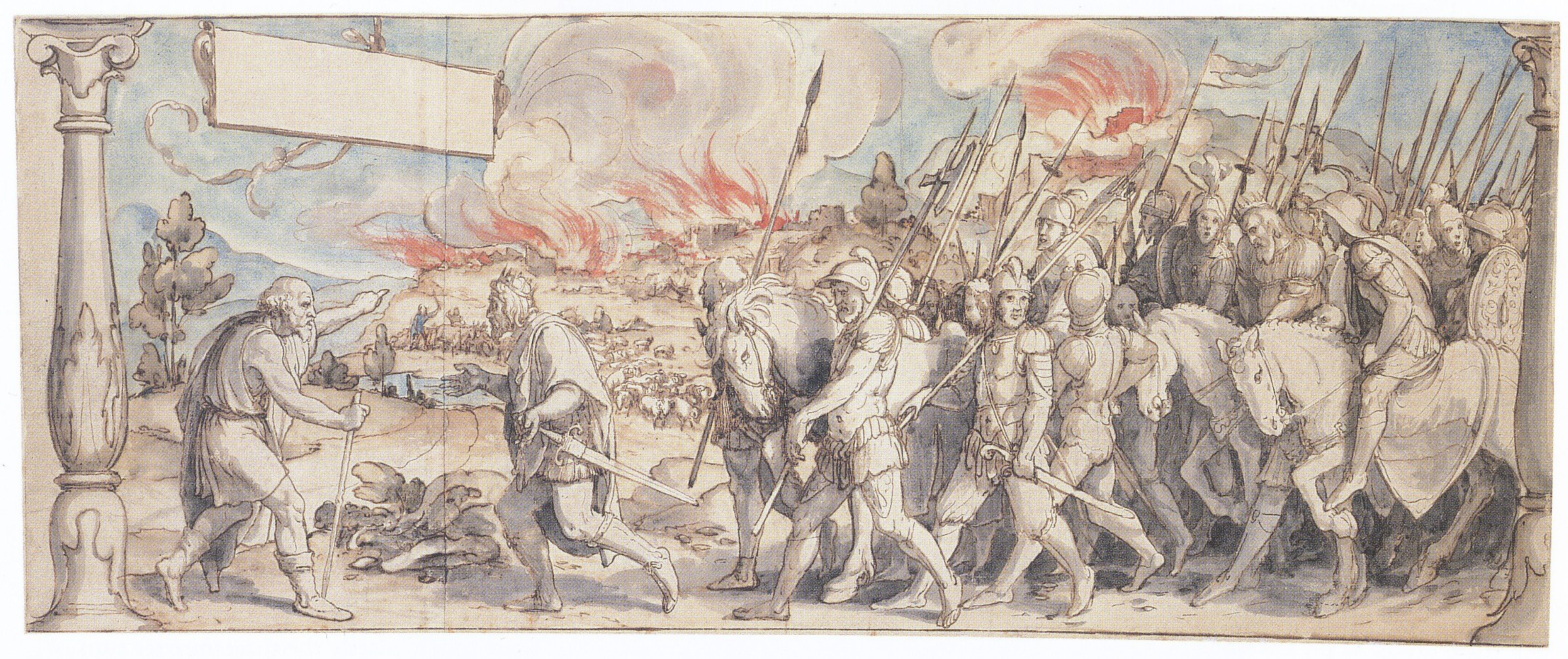
Samuel Cursing Saul, by Hans Holbein the Younger

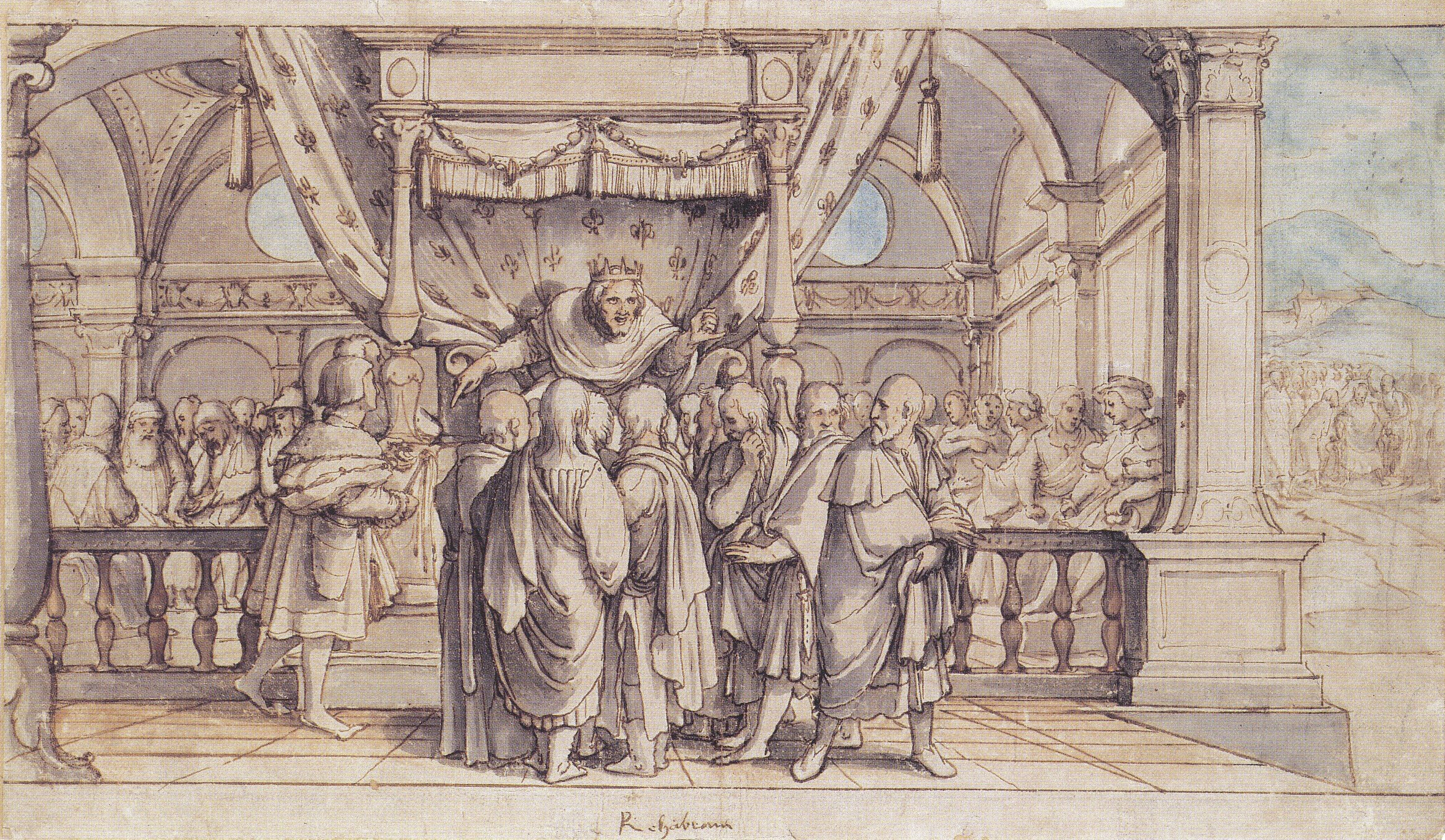
Rehoboam's Insolence, by Hans Holbein the Younger

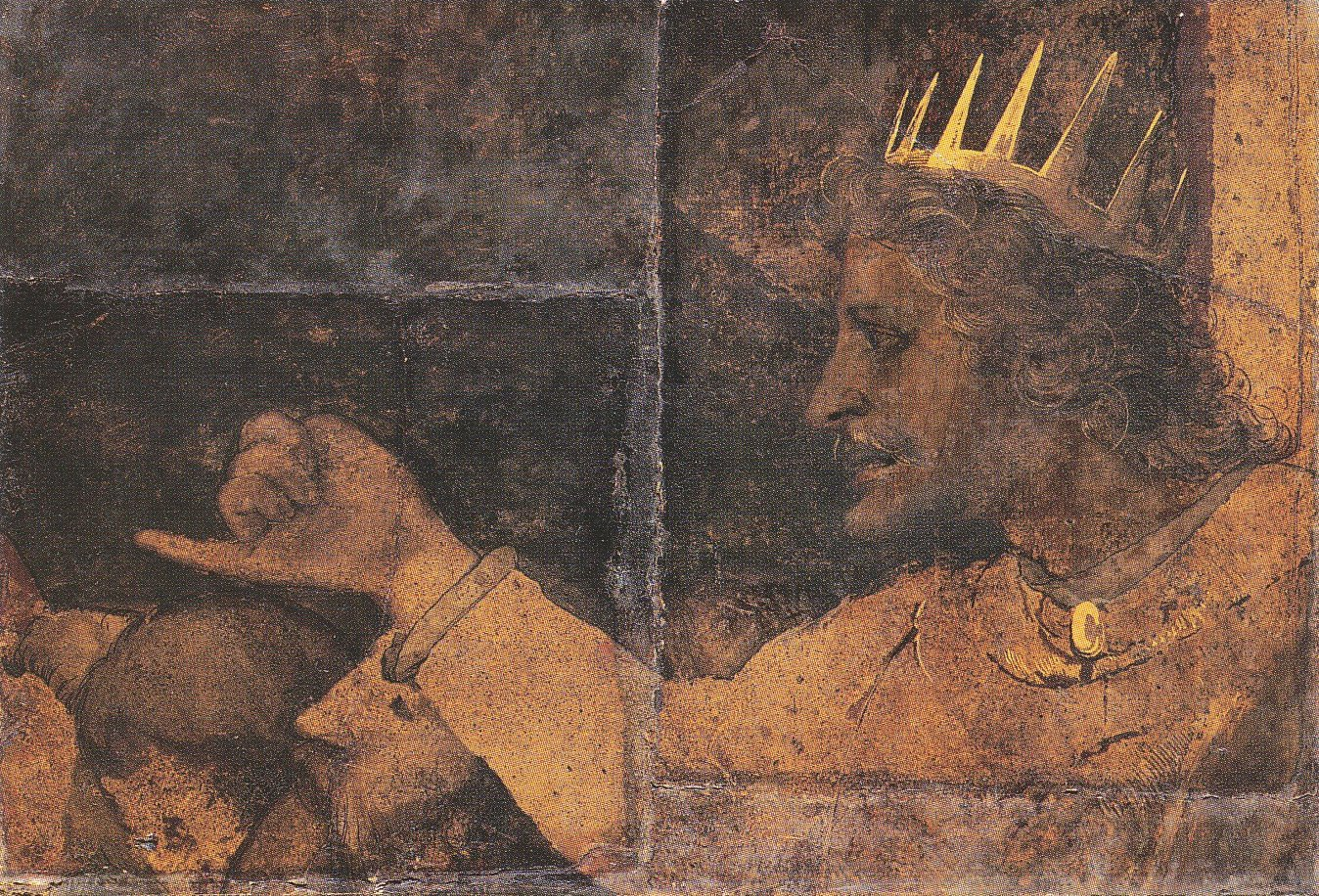
Fragment of Wall Painting from Basel Town Hall Council Chamber, by Hans Holbein the Younger

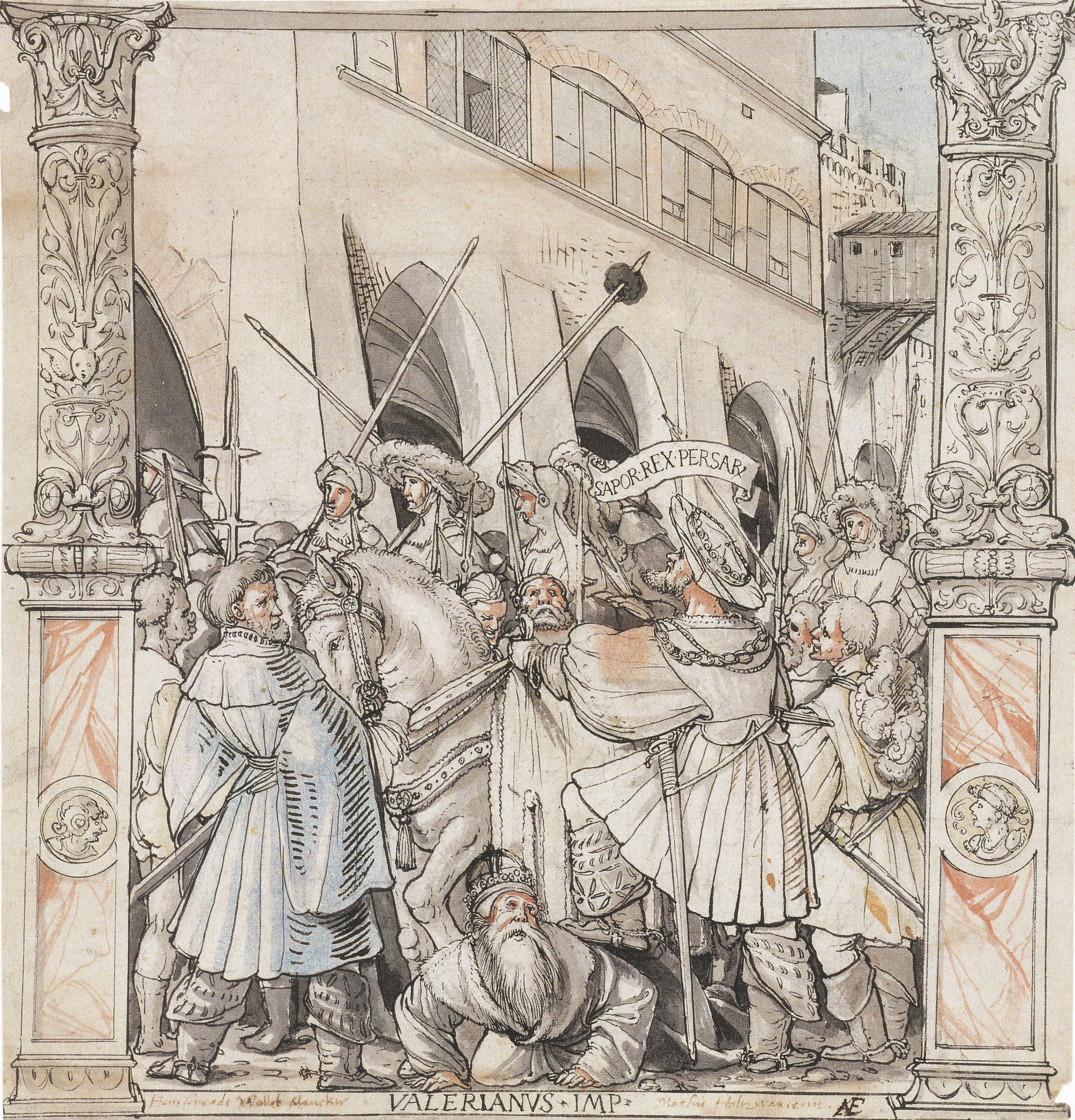
The Humiliation of Emperor Valerian by Shapur, King of Persia, by Hans Holbein the Younger

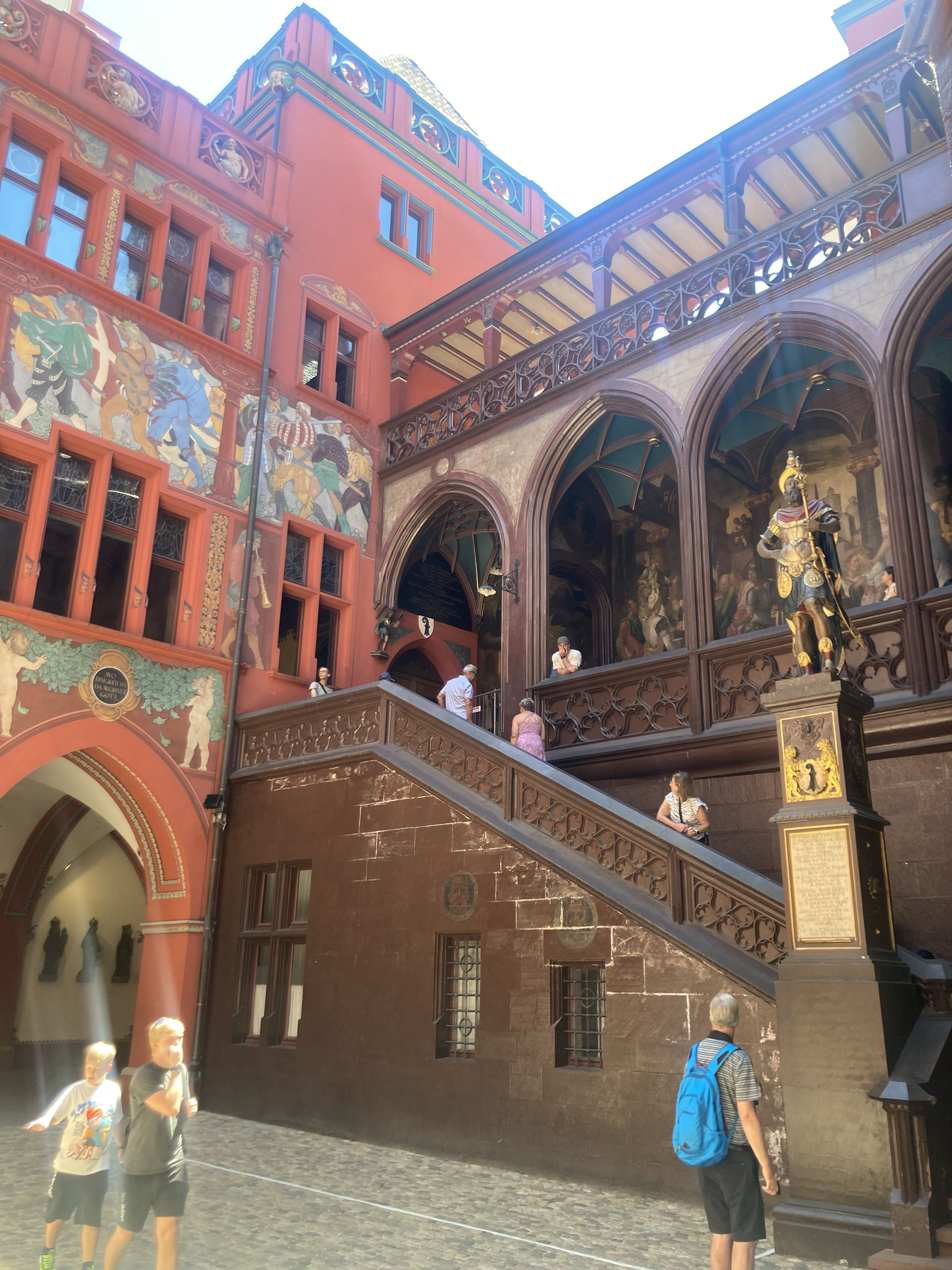
Interior courtyard of the building

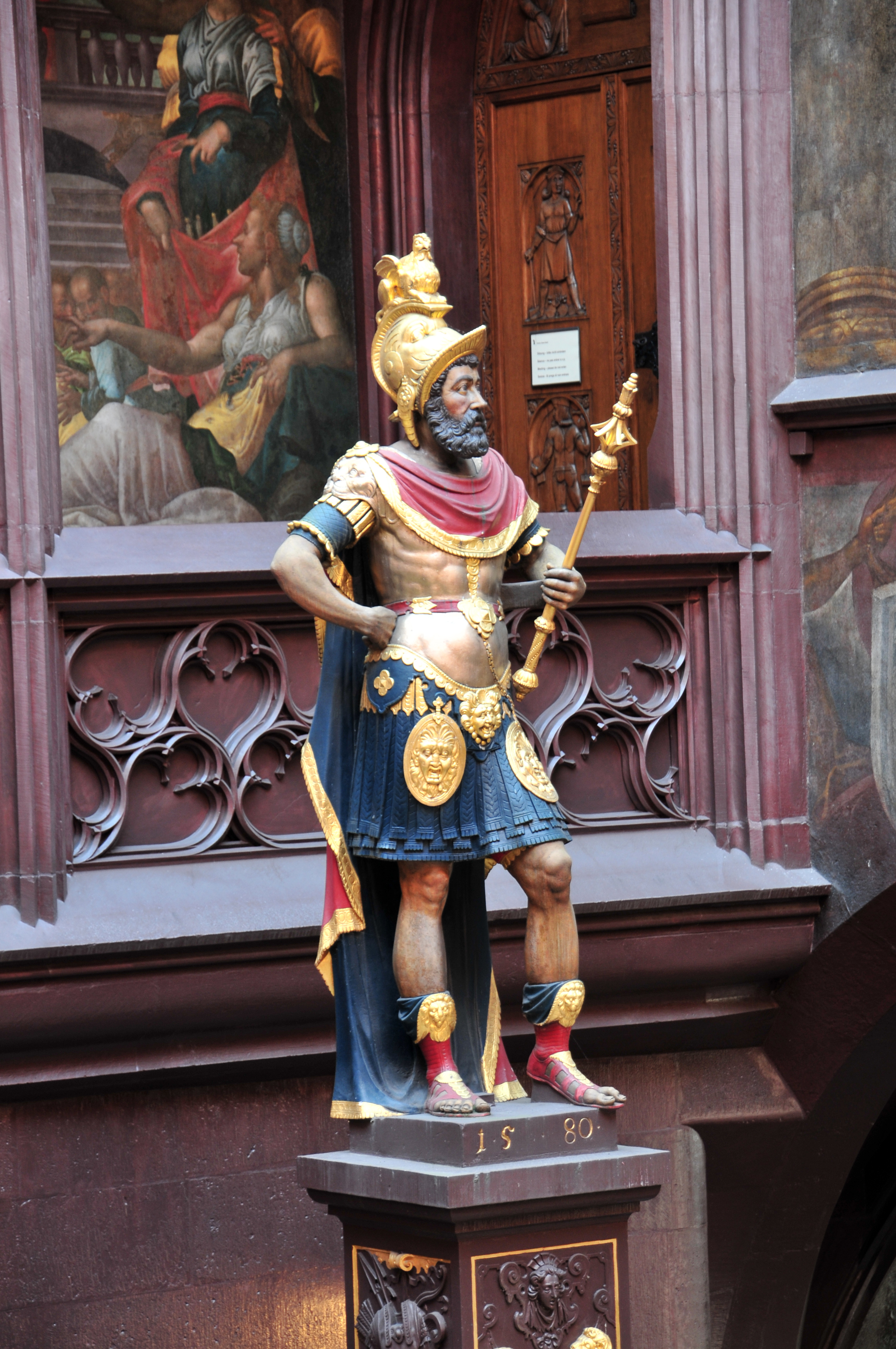
A statue from 1580 by Hans Michel depicting Lucius Munatius Plancus in the city hall

== See also ==
- Politics of Switzerland
