= Photo Basel =

Photography art fair in Basel, Switzerland

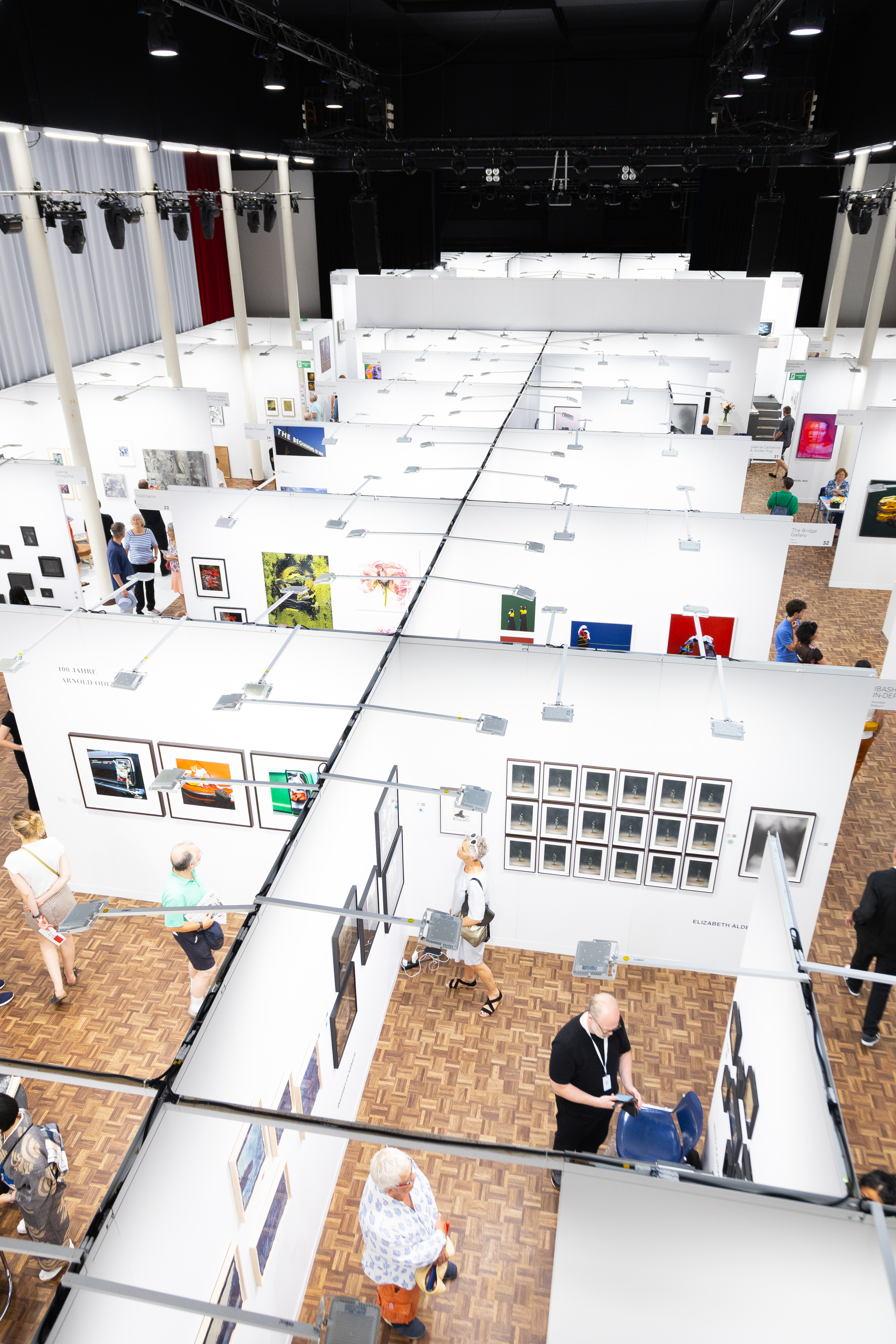
- Photo Basel, in Volkhaus Basel, in 2025
- Industry: Art
- Founded: 2015; 11 years ago in Basel, Switzerland
- Founders: Sven Eisenhut
- Products: Art fairs

Photo Basel is an annual art fair, showcasing photography, which takes place at the Volkhaus Basel in Basel, Switzerland during Art Basel week. Switzerland's first and only photography art fair, it showcases galleries both emerging and established, national and international, across a variety of different disciplines in photography.

Since its founding in 2015, yearly editions of Photo Basel have been covered by Artnet, The Guardian, Artsy, Time Out, and other publications.

== History ==
Photo Basel was founded by Sven Eisenhut, who still serves as its founding director. Its first edition ran in June 2015. Exhibitions are curated by Elwira Spychalska.

In 2024, Photo Basel unveiled a sector, titled Novum, dedicated to never-before-seen works of photography that were either created specifically for Photo Basel or recently discovered/rediscovered.
