= Messeplatz (Basel) =

Square in Basel, Switzerland

Coordinates: 47.5652°N 7.60129°E

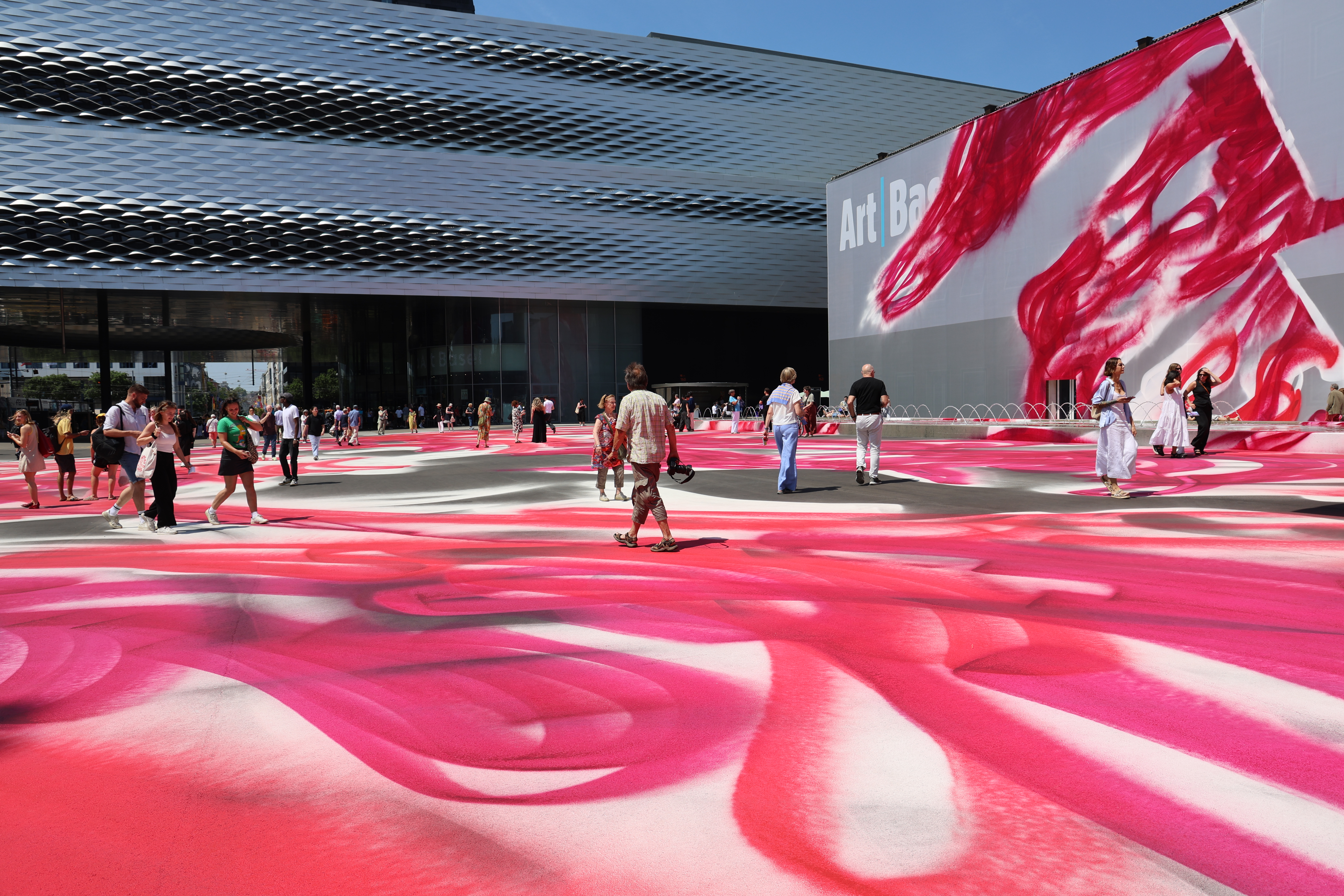
CHOIR installation by German Artist Katharina Grosse at Messeplatz at Art Basel 2025

Messeplatz is a paved 53,800 square-foot plaza between exhibition halls that serves as a public fairground or gathering area in the city of Basel.

It is considered the heart of the Art Basel fair, as well as other annual Basel trade shows, which take place in the neighboring Messe Basel buildings.

The plaza also serves as a commonly used area for public art installations. During the 2025 edition of the Eurovision Song Contest, Messeplatz hosted the Eurovision Village activities and has a 50-meter tall sculpture by Swiss artists Claudia Comte.

For its 2025 flagship fair, Art Basel commissioned German artist Katharina Grosse for CHOIR, a piece which covered the surfaces of Messeplatz in magenta and white paint.
