= Art Basel =

Series of annual art fairs held by a Switzerland-based organization

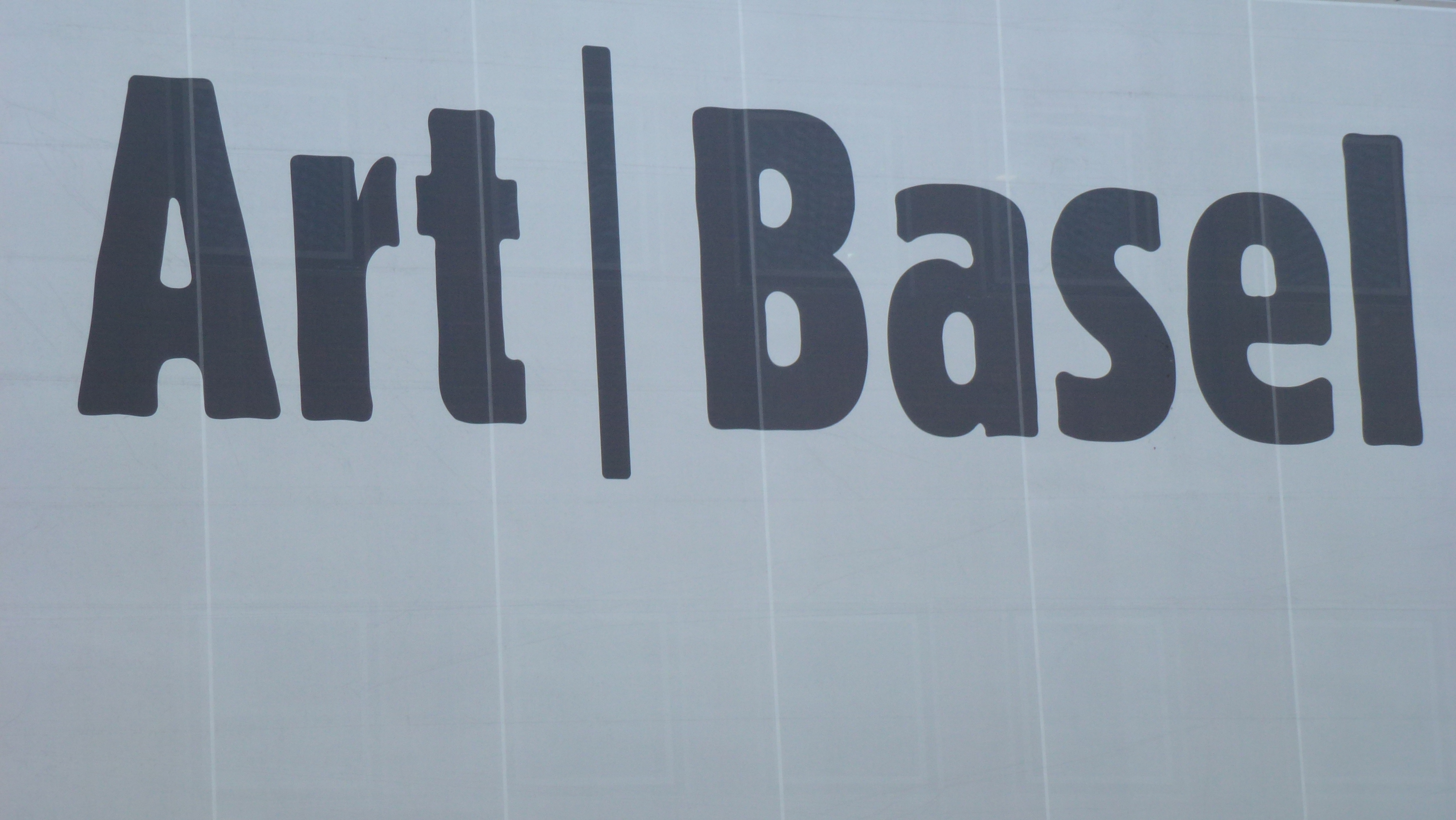
- Art Basel logo

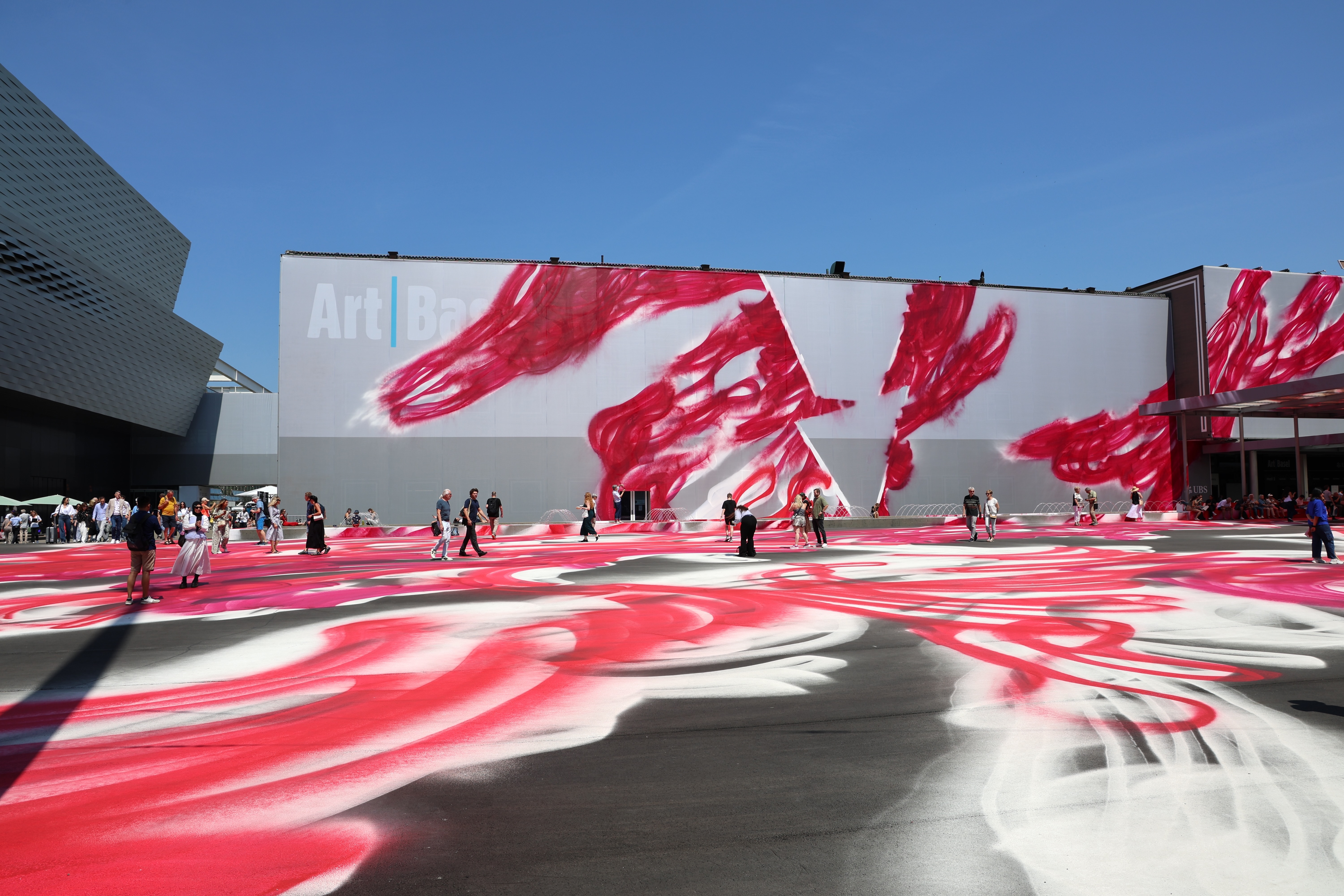
- Messeplatz with CHOIR installation by German artist Katharina Grosse at Art Basel 2025
- Industry: Art
- Founded: 1970; 56 years ago in Basel, Switzerland
- Founders: Ernst Beyeler, Trudl Bruckner and Balz Hilt
- Number of locations: 4 (2024)
- Products: Art fairs

Art Basel is a for-profit, privately owned and managed, international series of art fairs whose annual flagship event has long been considered the largest and most prestigious fair of the contemporary and modern art market. Art Basel started in Basel, Switzerland, in 1970. Since then, it has added annual satellite fairs in Miami, Hong Kong, Paris and Qatar.

The annual fairs bring together galleries, collectors, curators and artists for exhibitions, sales and programming. They also serve as an anchor for numerous other art fairs that simultaneously operate in parallel in the host cities.

Art Basel's parent company is MCH Group a Switzerland-based marketing company. Over recent years, the organization has adopted a strategy of moving Art Basel from being a series of industry fairs to being a lifestyle brand.

== Activities ==
The flagship Art Basel was started in 1970, but then extended additional art fairs to Miami Beach starting in 2002, Hong Kong starting in 2013 and Paris starting in 2022. Art Basel Qatar is scheduled to begin February 2026.

While the exhibition halls host many of the meetings between gallerists and prospective buyers, much of the activity around an art fair is understood to take place through social activities like private dinners, cocktail parties and late-night hotel gatherings.

=== Art Basel in Basel ===
The flagship Art Basel art fair takes place over a week in late June, and is centered at the Messe Basel exhibition center, in Messeplatz, with other activities scattered around the city. The fair usually begins with an invite-only private viewing days open to VIPs and high-end collectors, followed by days accessible to the public by purchased tickets.

Parallel but alternative art fairs that take place concurrently in Basel include Liste Art Fair Basel, which was founded in 1996; Volta, which was founded in 2005; Photo Basel, I Never Read, Art Book Fair, Basel Social Club, June Art Fair, AfricaBasel and AfrinovArt.

As of 2025, Art Basel launched the Art Basel Awards, which honors a range of people in the art world, including those who perform a supportive role for the actual creative individuals. In addition to artists, it recognizes curators, institutions, philanthropists, journalists and fabricators.

During the fair, the hotel Les Trois Rois becomes a congregation point for the art world’s upper echelons.

=== Art Basel Miami Beach ===
Art Basel Miami Beach takes place in early December each year in the Miami Beach Convention Center and is the cornerstone of Miami Art Week. It is considered the most important art fair in the United States.

There are two dozen satellite art fairs with different curatorial focuses. Prizm and Pinta focus on art made by the African diaspora and Latin Americans, respectively. NADA, or New Art Dealers Alliance, highlights up and coming galleries which can often offer an early look at future art stars though its aesthetic has been described as "throw-it-all-against-the-wall-and-see-what-sticks." The Untitled is also a curated selection of up and coming galleries.

The event was started in 2002 after efforts of local collectors to convince Art Basel fair organizers and local Florida government officials that Miami was a logical stop in the art world circuit. The inaugural Miami fair was originally scheduled for 2001, but was delayed after the 9/11 attacks.

Due to its geographic location, Art Basel Miami Beach fair highlights Latin American galleries, artists and institutions.

=== Art Basel Hong Kong ===
Art Basel Hong Kong takes place in March each year and is centered at the Hong Kong Convention and Exhibition Centre. It was created in to serve as a hub to draw galleries and artists from across Asia.

Art Basel Hong Kong grew out of Art HK, which was originally launched in 2008 by MCH Group, Angus Montgomery Arts and events organizer Tim Etchells. sparking investor interest in Hong Kong. MCH bought it out in 2013 to create Art Basel Hong Kong.

Among the alternative art fairs that take place concurrently to Art Basel Hong Kong is Supper Club, a collective gallery effort whose participation fees run a fraction of the main Art Basel Hong Kong.

=== Art Basel Paris ===
Art Basel Paris takes place in October of each year in the Grand Palais. Historically, Foire Internationale d'Art Contemporain had occupied the October art fair slot in the Grand Palais for close to half a century, before a surprise announcement in January 2022 that Art Basel's parent company would be hosting the fair later that year.

The new event was called Paris+ par Art Basel, in part because the seven-year contract between Grand Palais management company and MCH Group that the fair should not be branded “Art Basel, Paris.” Nonetheless, the fair was fully branded Art Basel Paris starting in 2024.

=== Art Basel Qatar ===
In January 2025, Art Basel announced it would be hosting a Doha version of its art fair in February 2026 called Art Basel Qatar at the city's M7 creative hub and the Design District, near the National Museum of Qatar. While the art fair calendar had already been relatively full, the Persian Gulf area had been seen by the international art industry as a prime candidate for expansion, as art sales in traditional western markets contracted.

Unlike the other fairs, Art Basel Qatar is structured as a partnership. It is co-organized with Qatar Sports Investments, a government-run investor that supported the FIFA World Cup in 2022, and QC+, an enterprise that operates under the government entity Qatar Museums. While Art Dubai had already been a prominent regional art fair that was two decades old, the Qatari government had spent significants amount of money to attract globally relevant events to counter the diplomatic isolation from neighboring states.

In Hyperallergic, Dr. Nasser Mohamed, a queer person who fled Qatar, criticized Art Basel for holding the fair there. He wrote "The open and vibrant Qatar presented through Art Basel is not the state that exists. The system I grew up in Qatar was a totalitarian, authoritarian dictatorship."

== Gallery ==
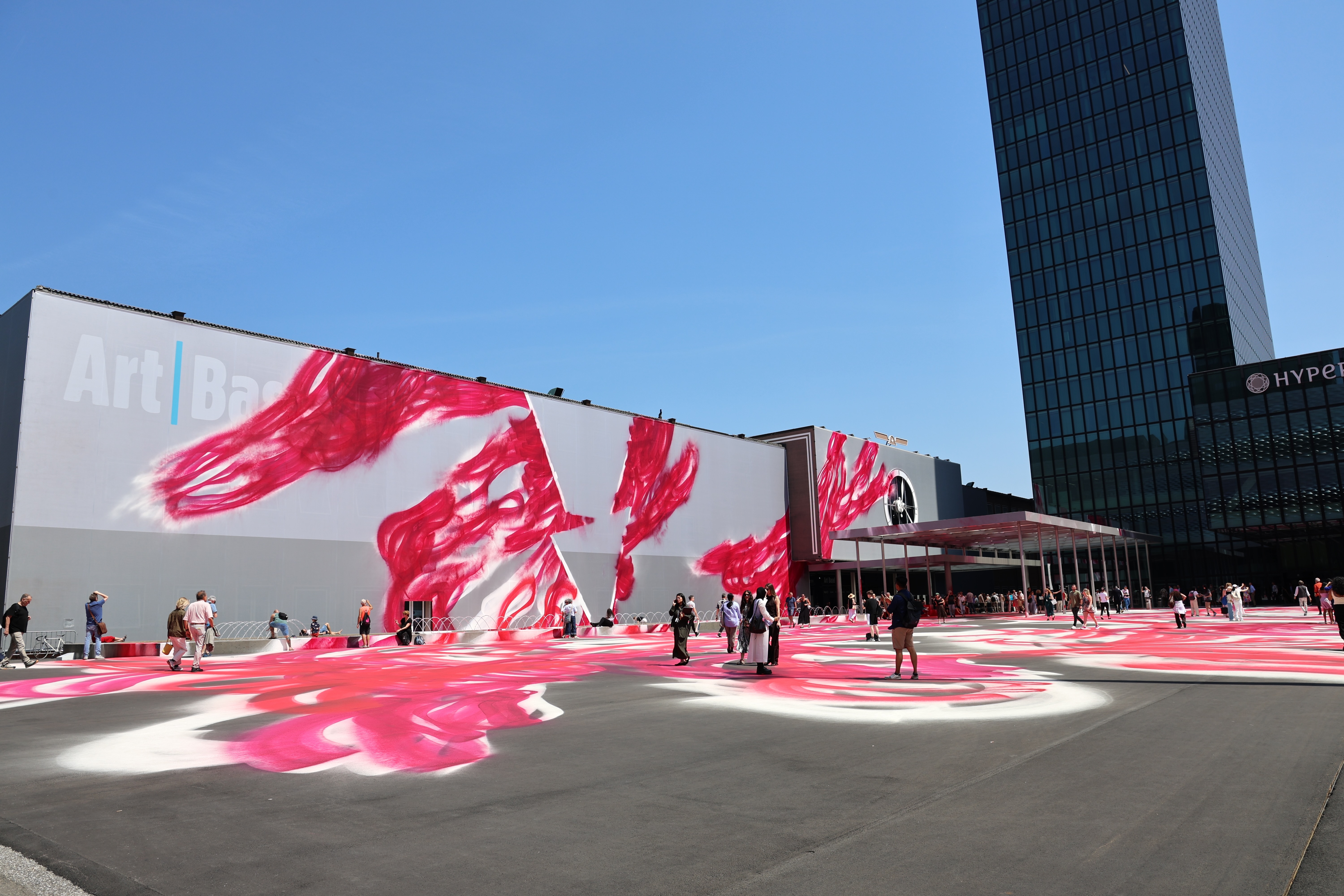
CHOIR installation by Katharina Grosse at Art Basel 2025

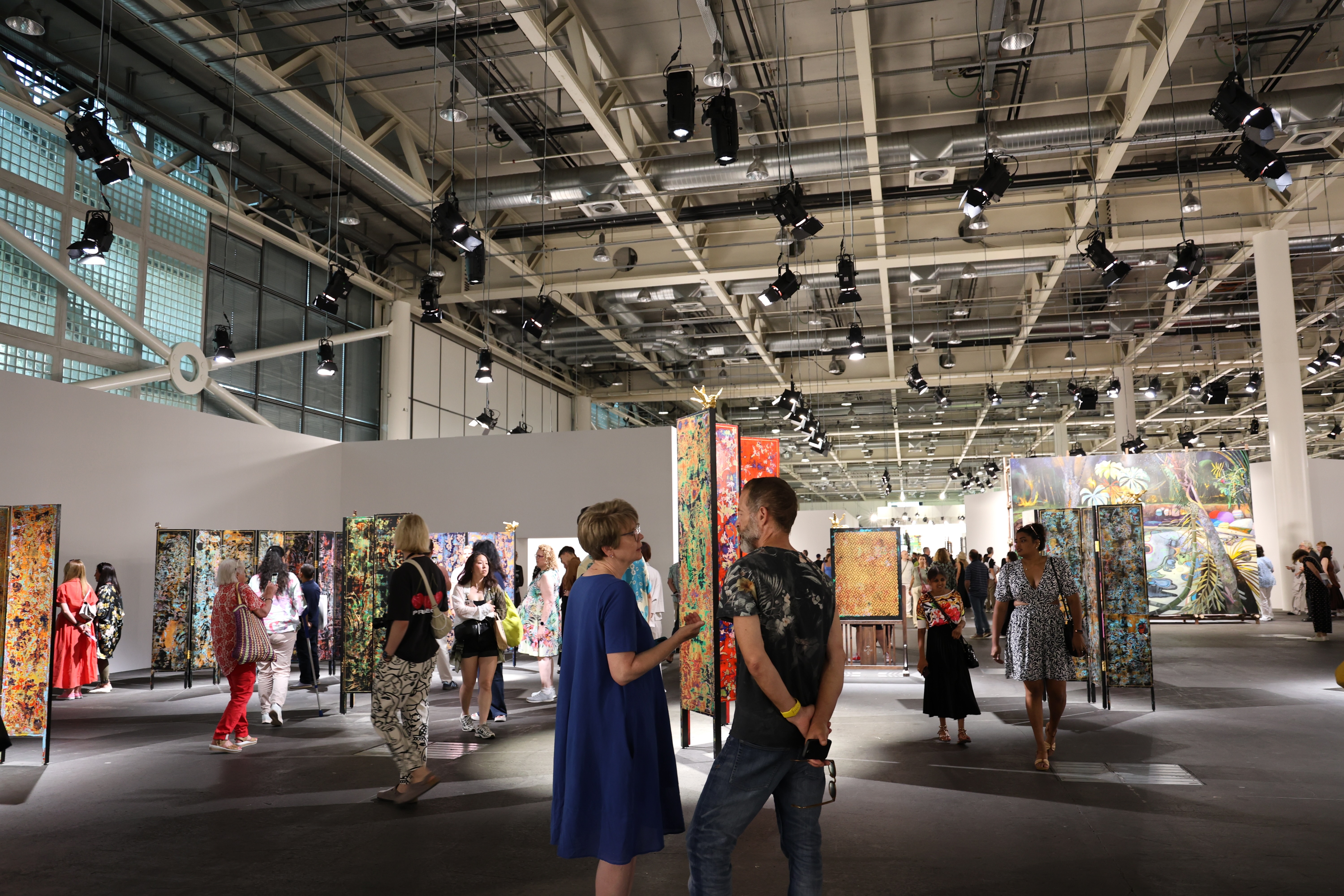
Unlimited showcase at Art Basel 2025

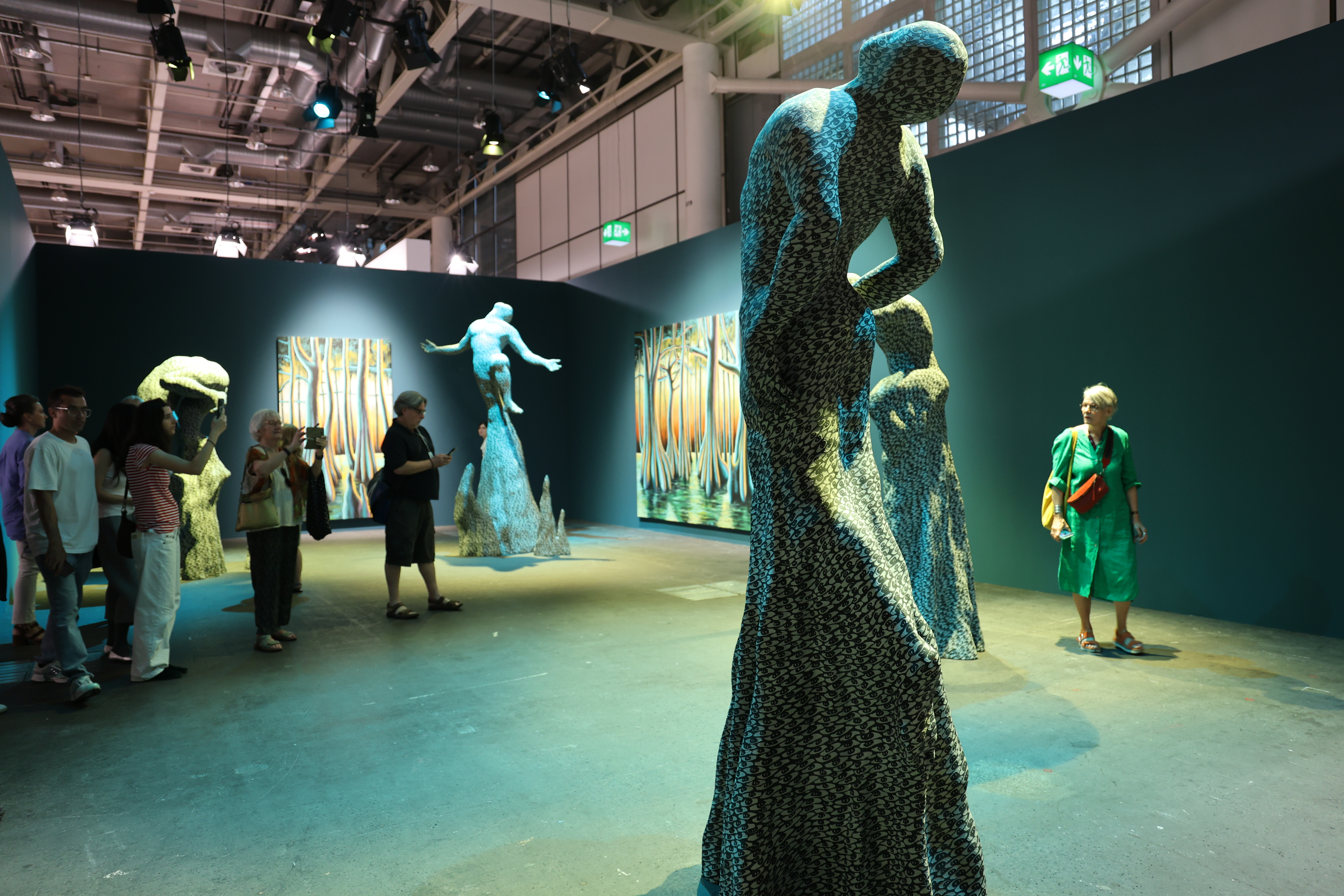
Didier William exhibit at Art Basel 2025

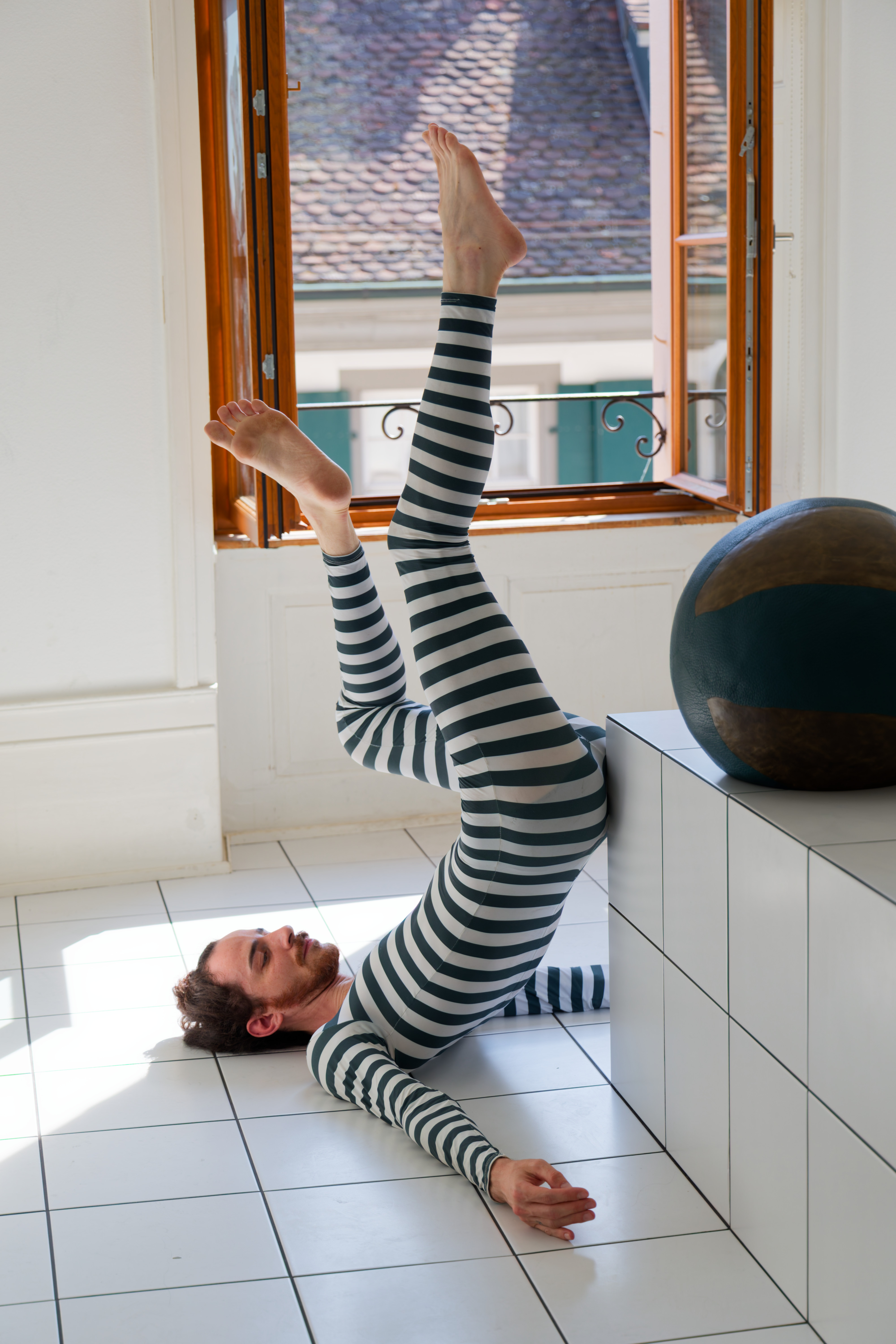
"The Squash" by Anthea Hamilton at Basel Social Club 2025

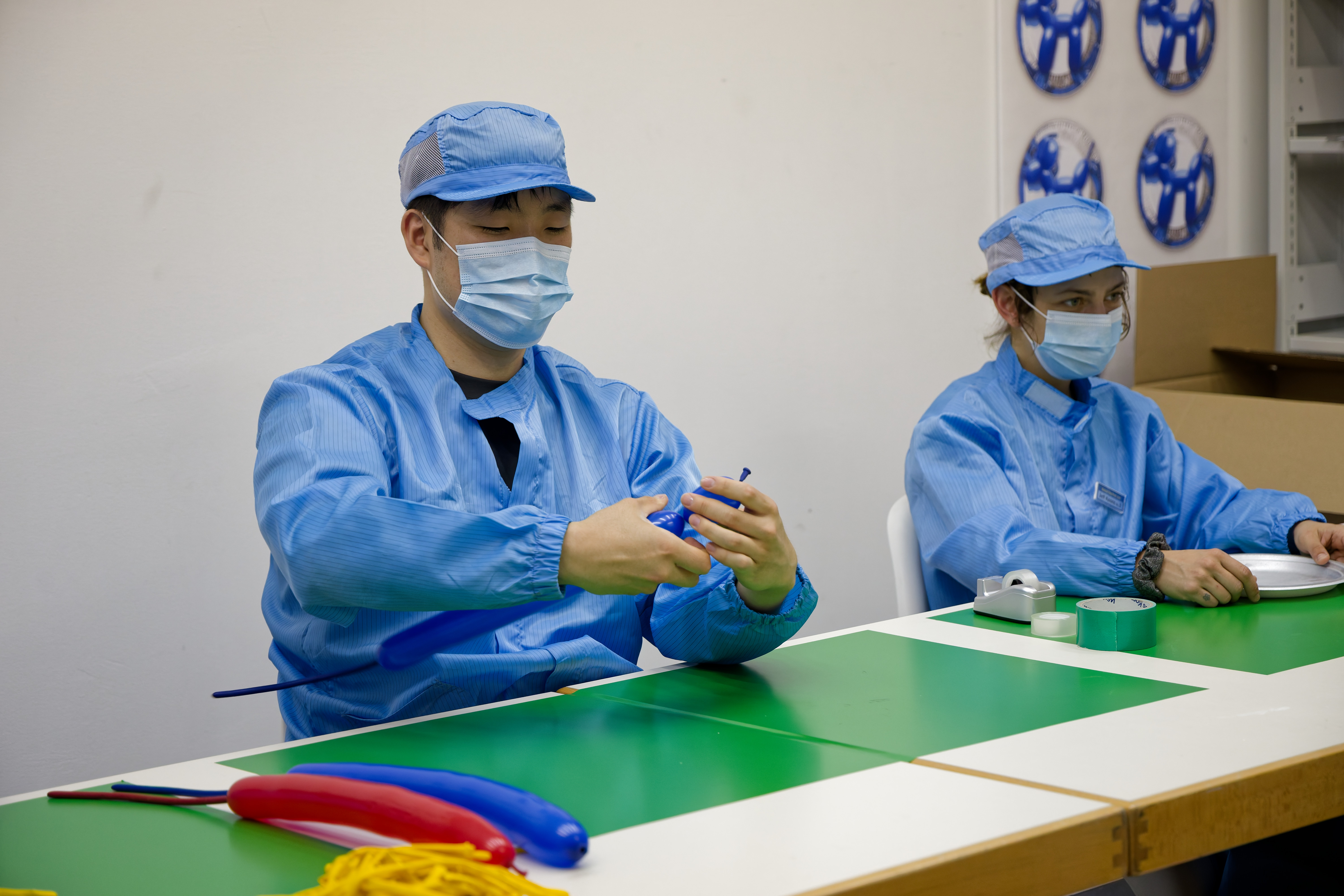
Dahoon Nam with Jeff Koons Special Sale at Basel Social Club 2025

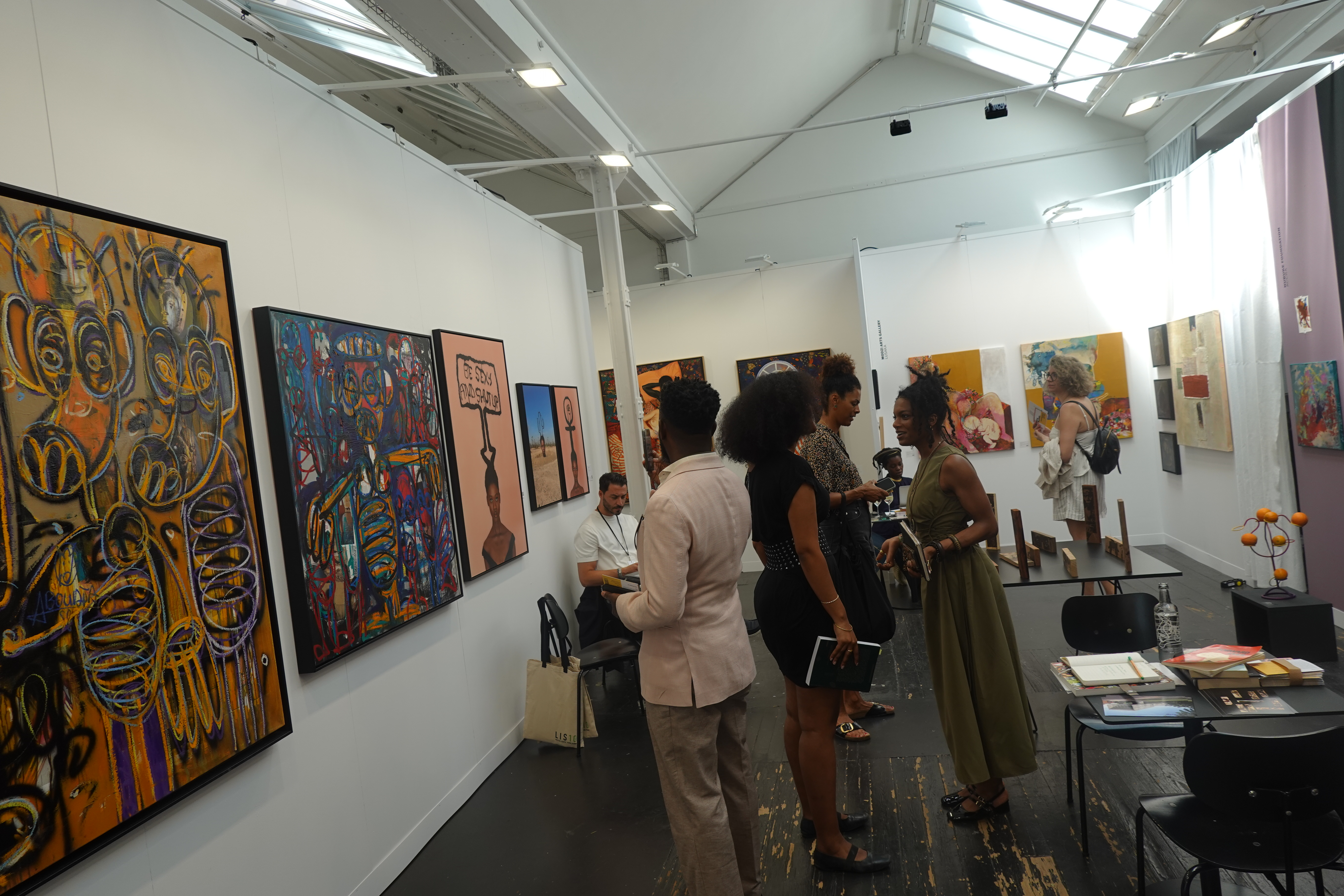
Africa Basel at Art Basel 2025

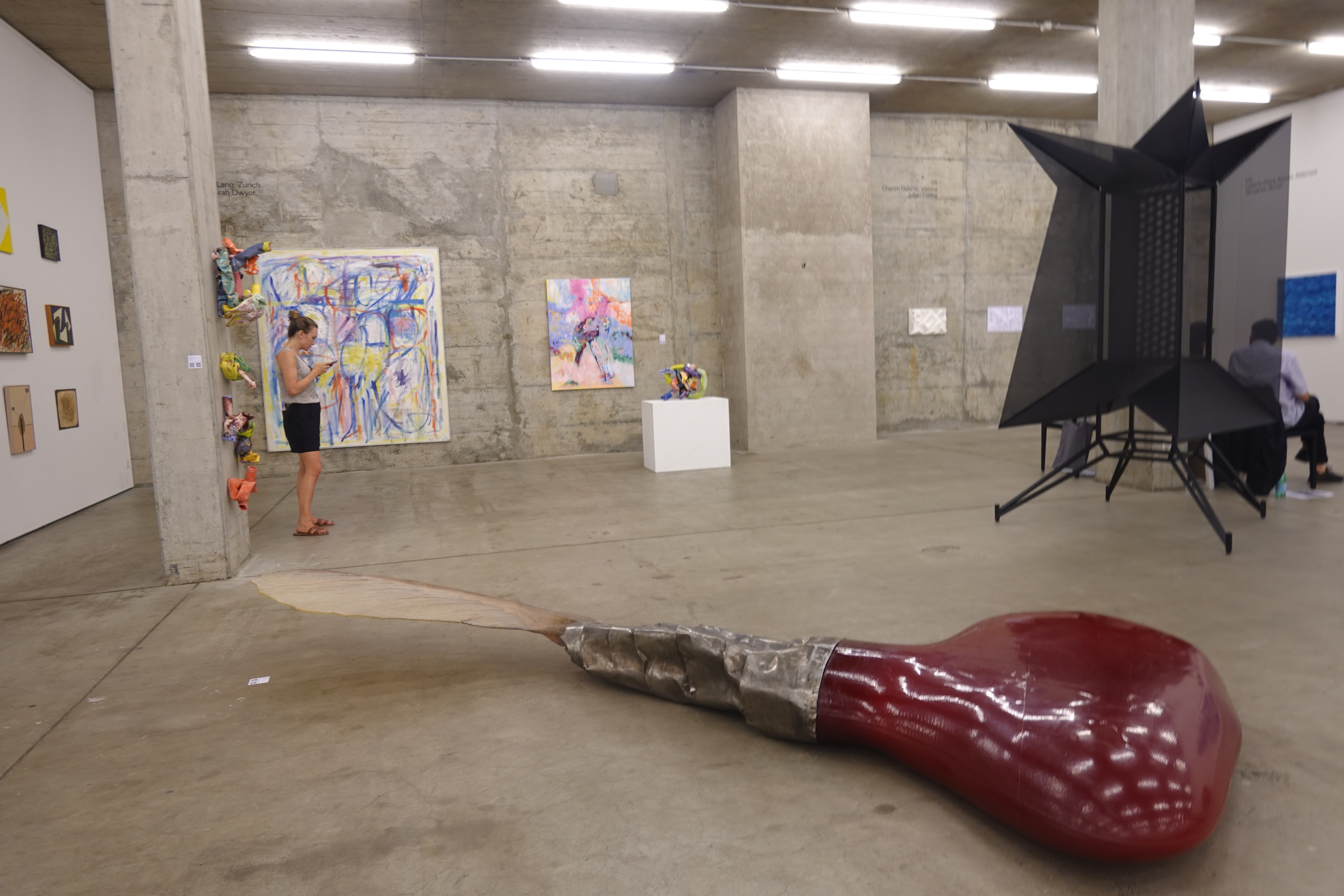
June Art Fair at Art Basel 2025

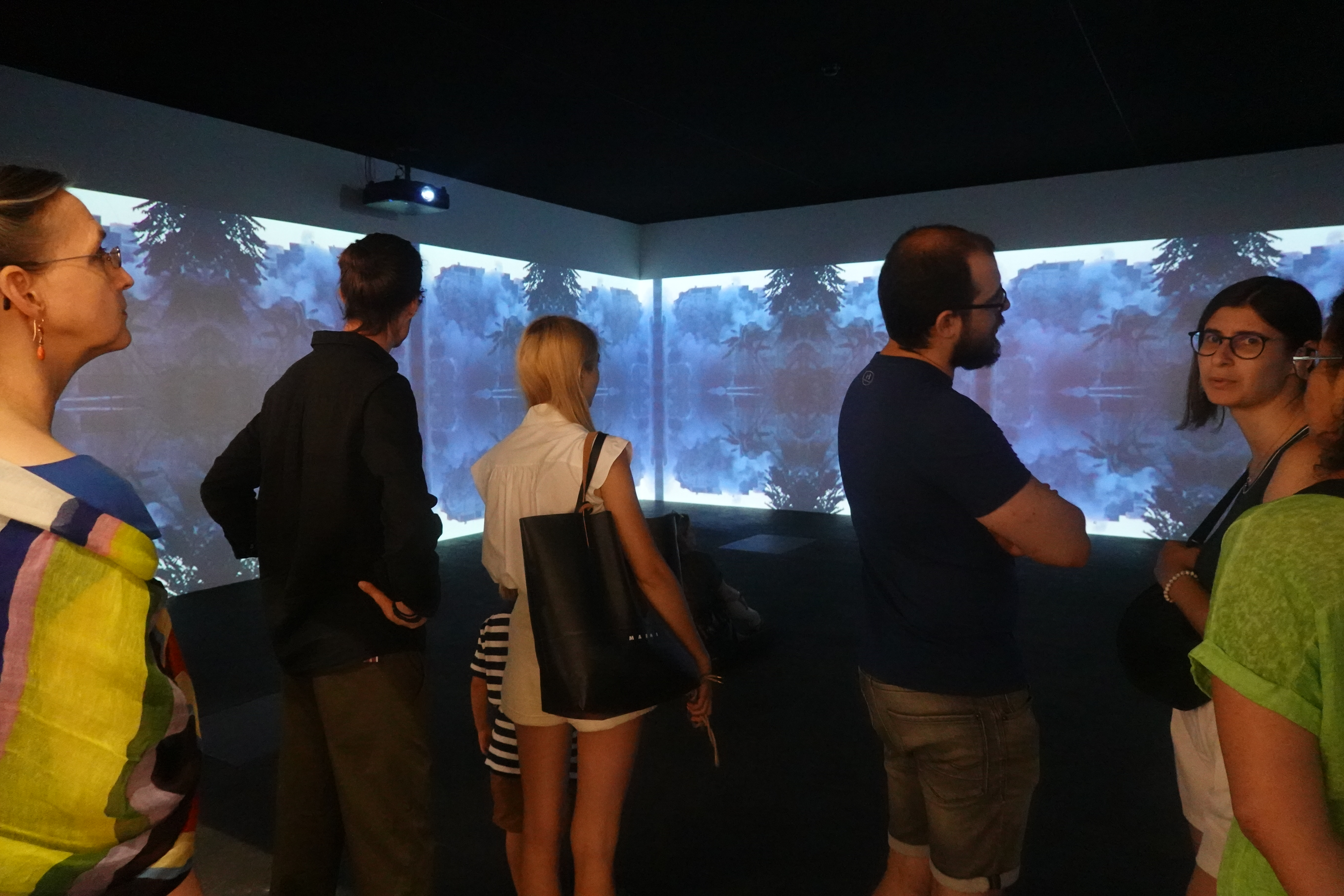
Walid Raad Installation at Unlimited Section of Art Basel 2025

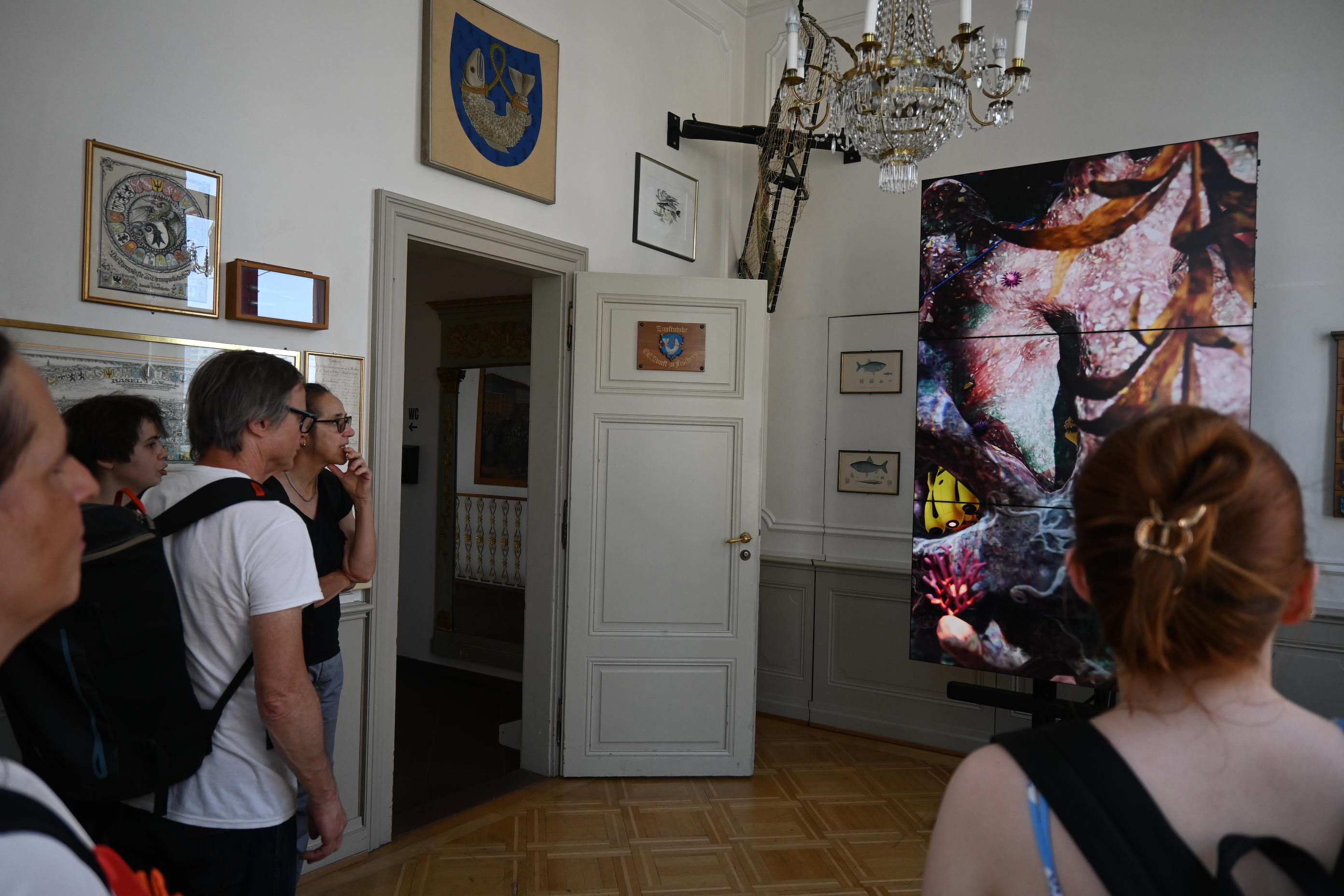
Theo Triantafyllidis' Drift Lattice at Art Basel 2025 Parcours

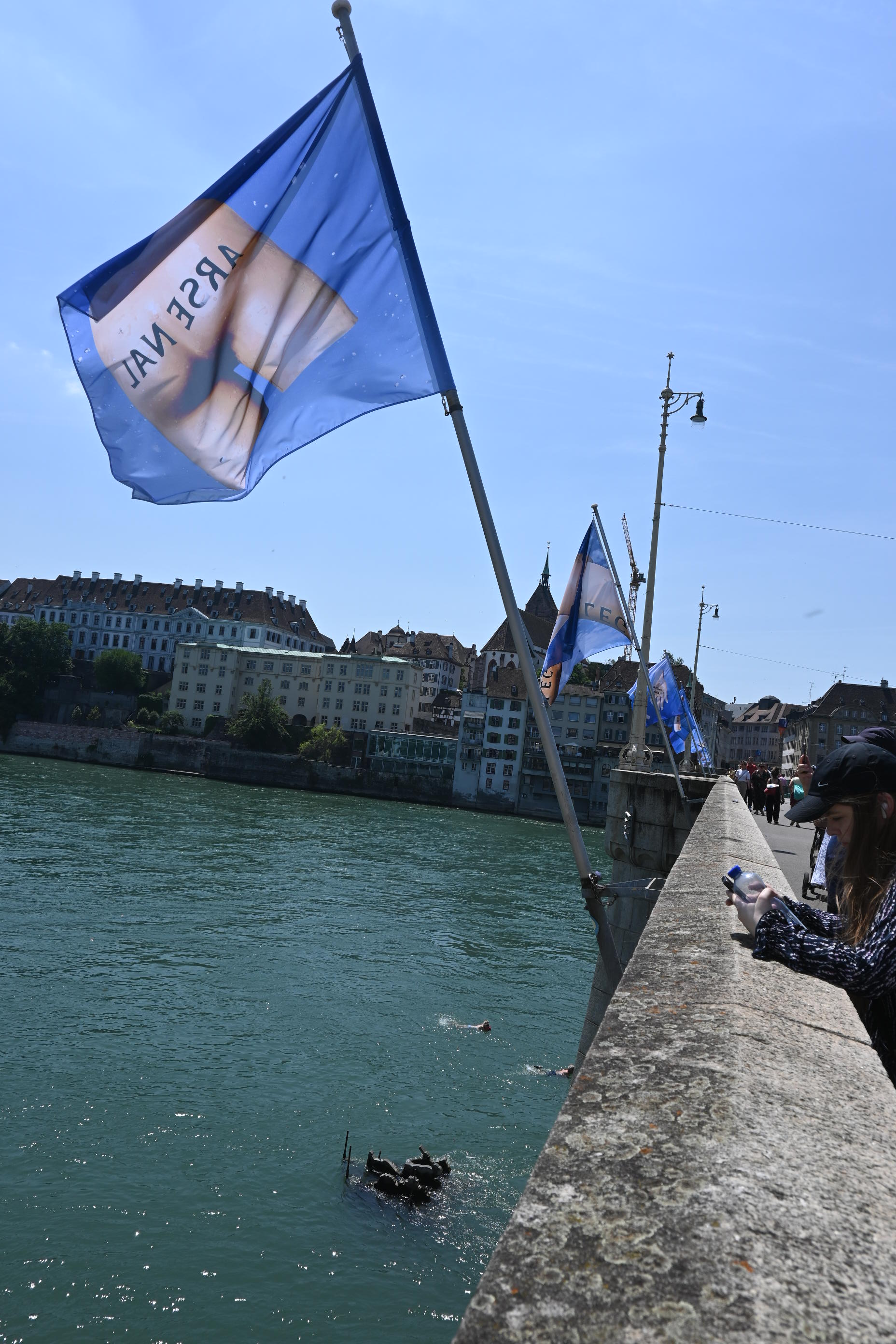
Fiona Banner' DISARM FLAGS at Art Basel 2025

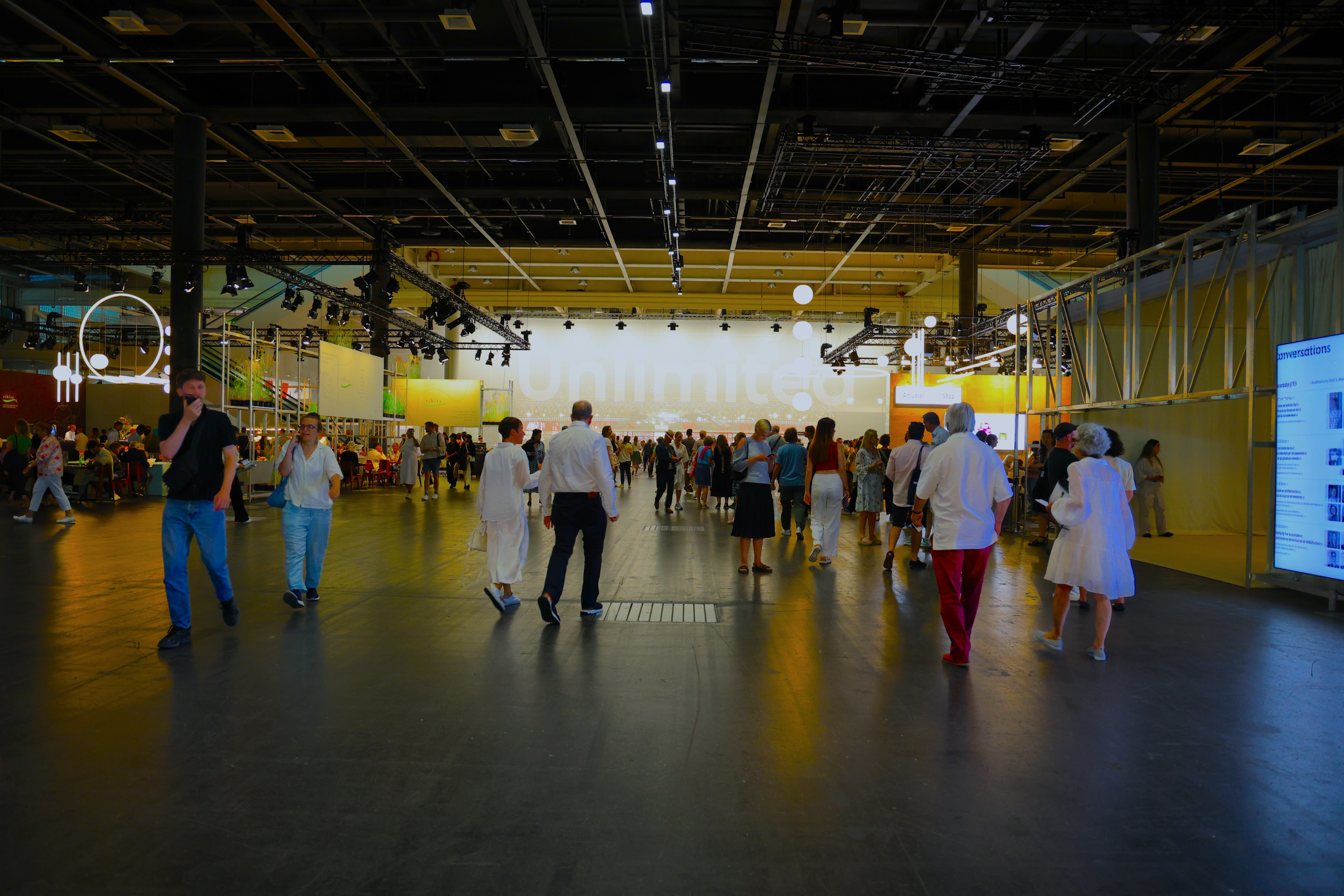
Unlimited entrance in Hall 1 at Art Basel 2025

== History ==
Art Basel was started by Basel gallerists Ernst Beyeler, Trudl Bruckner and Balz Hilt in 1970, to lure a new wave of collectors that emerged from the wealth of a post-war consumer society.

In its inaugural year, the Basel show attracted more than 16,000 visitors who viewed work presented by 90 galleries from ten countries. 30 art publishers also participated.

In 2000, Art Basel created Art Unlimited, a section for monumental artworks in the field of sculpture, installations, video art and performances in Messe Basel's newly built Hall 1.

Art Basel Miami Beach was first introduced in 2002 by the organizers of Art Miami.

In 2007, Ocean Drive launched the Art Basel Magazine with Sarah Harrelson as editor-in-chief. The same year, fair events in Russian started to appear.

All three of the 2020 Art Basel editions—Basel, Miami, Hong Kong—were cancelled due to the COVID-19 pandemic.

Art Basel's 2022 expansion included Paris+ par Art Basel, replacing the long-standing FIAC art fair.

== Notable exhibits ==
In 2019, Art Basel Miami Beach featured Italian artist Maurizio Cattelan's Comedian art piece, a banana duct-taped to a wall. Two of three editions sold for $120,000.

In the 2022 edition of Art Basel Miami, the American art collective MSCHF debuted ATM Leaderboard, an installation displaying a real-time ranking of the bank balances of users, with a pictures of their faces.

== Costs ==
The price of admission to Art Basels varies significantly depending on access levels and amenities. One-day ticket prices typically cost less than $100, but can increase to hundreds or thousands of dollars, where each higher price tier provides additional benefits, such as: early access to exhibit halls, VIP rooms, early purchasing; private tours; exclusive events and banquets.

Galleries pay for their space. As of 2019, the smallest galleries pay CHF 760 per square meter for a booth at the flagship Art Basel, and the largest galleries will pay CHF 905 per square meter. Prices rise relative to each additional square meter.

== Sponsors and partners ==
UBS has been the lead partner of the fair in Basel since 1994, the lead partner of Art Basel Miami Beach since its inception in 2002, and the lead partner of Art Basel Hong Kong since its inception in 2013.

Since 2015, BMW and Art Basel have presented the BMW Art Journey Award to honor promising emerging artists from around the world. Originally, the artists were chosen from the Discoveries sector in Hong Kong and the Positions sector in Miami Beach, but it later expanded. The chosen artist can select a destination almost anywhere in the world to create new works.

== Reception ==
In 2011, art collector Adam Lindemann wrote an essay on why he was not attending Art Basel that year by describing the excess of VIPs and their lavish events.

In comparison to the Venice Biennale, Art Basel was described by Georgina Adam as "less curatorially ambitious, less sprawling, better focused, easier to navigate". The capacity to exhibit many large-scale works also makes Art Basel stand out in the art fair world.

== Other initiatives ==
Through the years, Art Basel has partnered with other organizations to support contemporary art globally. Some of these program are listed below:

=== Art Basel Cities ===
Art Basel, the city's local art stakeholders and the city's officials sit together to develop an annual program in line with the city's mid- and long-term cultural development goals. This initiative was launched during the 2016 Hong Kong edition of Art Basel. The first partner city was Buenos Aires.

=== The Crowdfunding Initiative ===
Partnership between Kickstarter to provide visibility and generate support for projects (artist residencies, education programs, public installations, other innovative artistic projects) from non-profit organizations around the world.

=== The Art Market ===
Annual global art market analysis. The first report was published in 2017.

=== Executive-education program ===
Collecting Contemporary Art in Hong Kong was launched by Art Basel, HKU SPACE Centre for Degree Programmes (CDP) and Central Saint Martins College of Arts and Design (CSM).

=== Podcasts ===
Intersections: The Art Basel Podcast ran from July 2021 to November 2022, and guests included Joan Jonas, Moses Sumney, Paul Donovan and RM.

== Leadership ==
Art Basel's CEO is Noah Horowitz Prior leaders include:

- Lorenzo Rudolf, 1991–1999
- Sam Keller, 2000–2007
- Cay Sophie Rabinowitz, Annette Schönholzer, Marc Spiegler, 2007–2008
- Annette Schönholzer, Marc Spiegler, 2008–2012
- Marc Spiegler, 2012–2022
- Noah Horowitz, 2022–

Curators of the Unlimited section, which features large art pieces, have included

- Simon Lamunière (2000–2011)
- Gianni Jetzer (2012–2019)
- Giovanni Carmine (since 2021)

== Visits ==
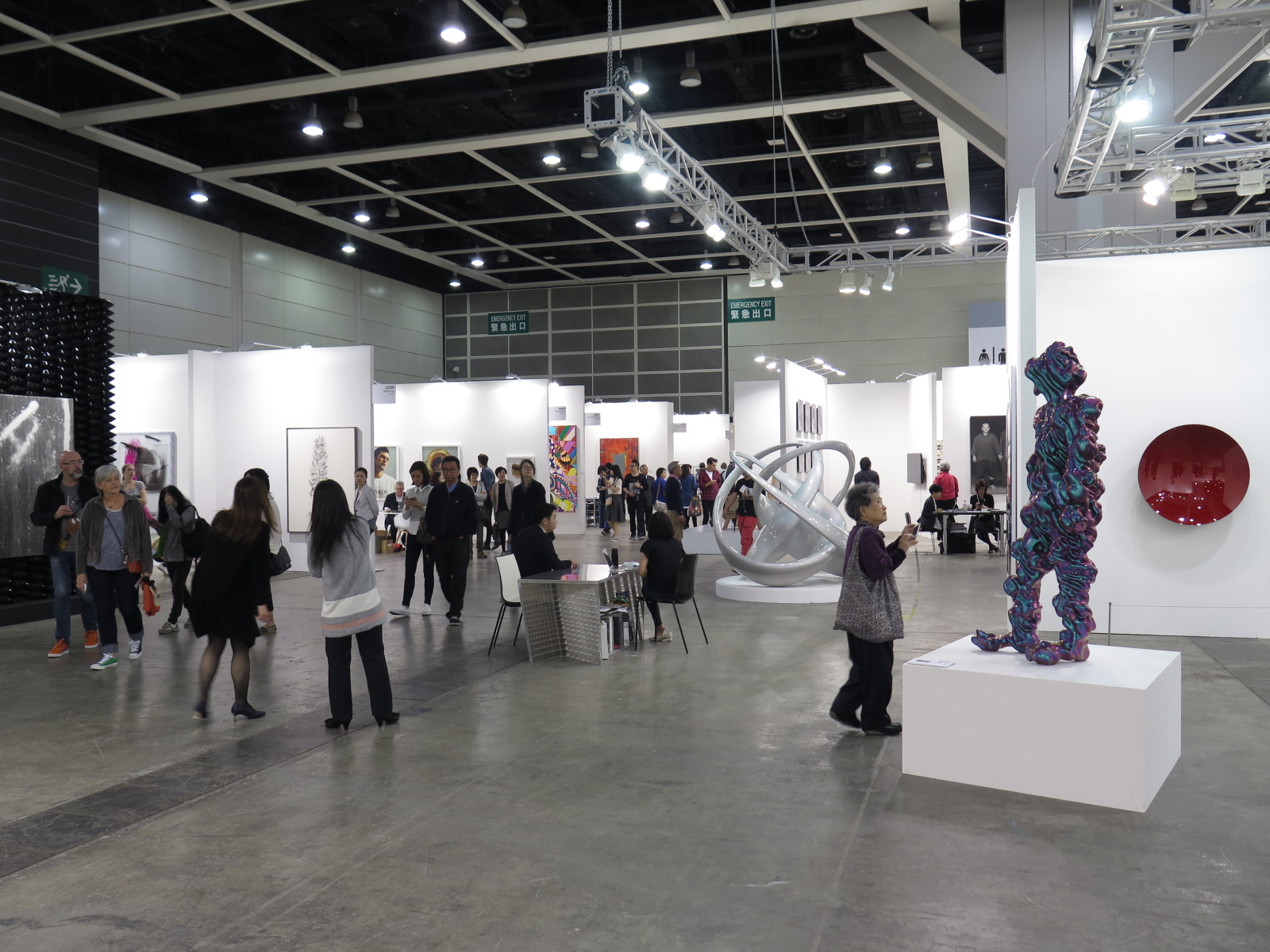
Art Basel Exhibition in Hong Kong

Year	Location	Visitors	Exhibitors	Countries represented
1970	Basel	16,000	90	10
1975	Basel	37,000	300	21
2006	Miami		180	
2019	Basel	93,000	290	35
2019	Miami	81,000	269	29
2019	Hong Kong	88,000	242	35
2021	Basel		273	
2021	Hong Kong		104	
2022	Paris		156	

== See also ==
- Museums in Basel
- Art Zurich
