= Lorenzo Rudolf =

Swiss art impresario and curator

Lorenzo Rudolf (born 1959 in Bern, Switzerland) is a Swiss art impresario, curator, art fair organiser, advisor and key note speaker.

== Biography ==
Born in Bern, Switzerland on 20 May 1959, Rudolf studied law at the University of Bern, before joining SIX Financial Information, a globally active telecommunications company in Zurich, as international PR Manager in 1988.

In 1991, Rudolf was appointed Director of Art Basel, where he revolutionized the international art fairs market and initiated a global expansion of the fair, developing a waiting list of over 700 galleries by the time he left in 2000. By introducing a strict selection process for exhibitors corporate sponsorships, VIP privileges and educational fringe events.

Rudolf became known for his global outlook and commitment to broadening artistic horizons, examples of this include introducing the critically lauded Art Statements and Art Unlimited platforms to the fair. Under his tenure at Art Basel, Rudolf also created and initiated Art Basel Miami Beach, which was launched in 2002 and made Art Basel the first global player in the international art market. The fair was initially considered by some to be controversial as it did not take place in New York – known by many to be America’s art capital - but already with its first edition it became the most important art fair on the American continent. Rudolf was also the initiator and, together with Claude Nobs of the Montreux Jazz Festival, the founder of Swiss Top Events.

Between 2000 and 2003, Rudolf ran the Frankfurt Book Fair. In 2007, he created and launched ShContemporary in Shanghai – the first internationally competitive contemporary top art fair in Asia, which was an important bridge between the Chinese / Asian and the Western art world, bringing together (leading) artists, galleries, collectors and curators from both sides, creating the necessary juxtaposition, cross-over and exchange between the two hemispheres; the fair was a crucial catalyst and booster for the Chinese and the Asian art market. In 2010 he founded Art Stage Singapore, Southeast Asia’s first international art fair which gave special importance to the region’s self-contained national art scenes, connected them, boosted the exchange between them and created a new Southeast Asian awareness and understanding; as a consequence new professional galleries, museums, private / corporate collections, art fairs, etc. emerged all over the region; the fair was Southeast Asia’s flagship event, opening for its artists, galleries, collectors and curators the door to the international art world and art market.

Rudolf, who was also advisor to Arte Fiera Bologna and Art Paris and created and lead art projects in Europe, Asia and the US, currently lives and works in Lugano. He is fluent in German, English, Spanish, French and Italian.
