= Paris Art Week =

Art fairs week in Paris

Paris Art Week is an umbrella term referring to a concentration of art fairs, major exhibitions and public programming that takes place during October. It has been anchored by Art Basel Paris and Paris+ par Art Basel since 2022. Prior, Paris Art Week had been anchored by Foire Internationale d’Art Contemporain (FIAC) until 2021. The anchoring events, previously FIAC and now Art Basel, tend to attract major galleries and artists, where the smaller fairs like Paris Internationale and Asia Now are able to fill the gaps with more emerging artists as well as creating more space for the multitudes of deserving artists that cannot fit in one fair.

== Satellite Fairs ==
The major fairs that are included in Paris Art Week are Art Basel Paris as well as the long running fairs of Paris Internationale and Asia Now. In 2024 other fairs included: Design Miami.Paris, OFFSCREEN, and AKAA (Also Known as Africa).

2024 saw a new collaborative fair in The Salon by the American nonprofit New Art Dealers Alliance (NADA) and the Paris collective called The Community. The fair brings in a combination of commercial galleries from NADA's side as well as non-profit organizations from The Community side, creating a unique mix.

== History ==
The week was originally anchored by Foire Internationale d'Art Contemporain (FIAC), which started in 1974 and is widely considered the flagship arts event in Paris.

In 2022 Swiss company Art Basel took over the venue and time slot at the Grand Palais in which FIAC was previously held.
