= Jennifer Flay =

French art dealer (born 1959)

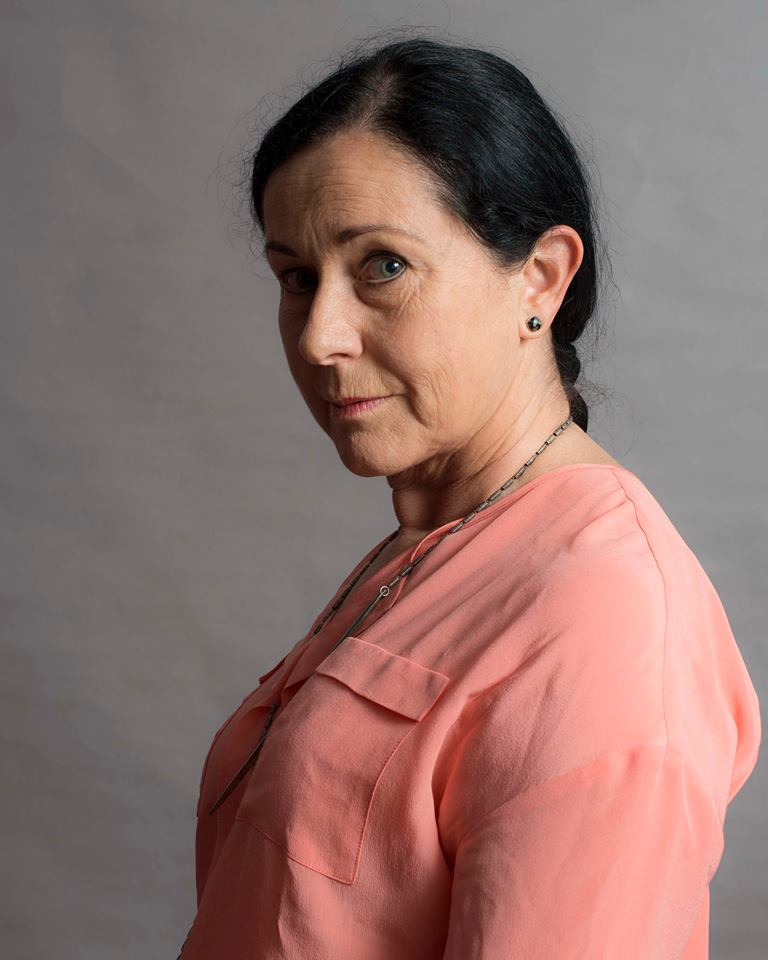
- Portrait of Jennifer Flay by Pascal Ferro (2013)
- Born: 1959 (age 66–67); Auckland, New Zealand
- Occupations: President of the Advisory Board Paris + Art Basel. Board of Directors Fiminco Foundation. Curator & writer
- Known for: Art gallery owner in Paris (1991-2002), Fiac director (2003-2021)

Jennifer Flay is a Paris-based art dealer and curator. From 2003 to 2021 she was the director of the FIAC (Foire Internationale d'Art Contemporain) art fair.

== Early life ==
Flay was born in Auckland in 1959. She came to France in 1980 to study art history at the University of Nice.

== Career ==
In 1991 Flay opened a gallery on rue Debelleyme in the Marais district. She has exhibited many international artists, including Richard Billingham, Claude Closky, Melanie Counsell, John Currin, Willie Doherty, Felix Gonzalez-Torres, Dominique Gonzalez-Foerster, Karen Kilimnik, Sean Landers, Liz Larner, Lisa Milroy, Rei Naito and Xavier Veilhan. In 1997 she moved her gallery to the 13th art district rue Louise-Weiss in Paris.

In 2003 she was named artistic director of FIAC, and general director of the art fair from 2010 to 2021.

In 2022 she curated the first exhibition at the Fiminco Foundation in Romainville. The exhibition, named De toi à moi, brought together the work of ten young artists based in France: Elsa Werth, Liv Schulman, Sara Sadik, Myriam Mihindou, Randa Maroufi, Tirdad Hashemi and Soufia Erfanian, Neila Czermak Ichti, Mégane Brauer and Bianca Bondi.

In 2023, she was appointed President of the Advisory Board of Art Basel in Paris.

== Honours ==
- Legion of honour Officer (2015)
- Ordre des Arts et des Lettres Commander (2020)
