= Clément Delépine =

Clément Delépine is the director of Lafayette Anticipations. Until late 2025, he was the director of Art Basel Paris, formerly known as Paris+ par Art Basel.

== Personal life ==
Delépine was born near Paris in 1981.

== Career ==
Delépine has worked at Bortolami in New York and at the gallery of Jean-Gabriel Mitterrand in Paris. He later served as co-director of Paris Internationale, a prominent fair for emerging gallerists. During this period, he was recommended to Marc Siegler, the chief executive officer of Art Basel, who was seeking a candidate to bring renewed energy to a new October art fair in Paris.
