= Hôtel de Guénégaud =

Hôtel de Guénégaud may refer to one of several 17th-century hôtels particuliers (large townhouses) in Paris:

- Hôtel de Guénégaud (rue des Archives), completed in 1655
- Hôtel de Guénégaud, the name of the Hôtel de Nevers (left bank) from 1646 to 1670
- Hôtel de Guénégaud, another name of Salle de la Bouteille or Guénégaud Theatre
- Hôtel de Guénégaud or Hôtel du Plessis-Guénégaud, located on the Quai Malaquais and known by these names from 1670 to 1680
