= Art Basel Paris =

Art fair in Paris

Art Basel Paris, formerly Paris+ par Art Basel, is an annual art fair in the Grand Palais exhibition hall in Paris first held in 2022. Taking place in October of each year, the fair is a satellite offshoot of the flagship Art Basel fair in Switzerland.

Prior to 2024, the festival was known as Paris+ par Art Basel and took place in a temporary space near the Eiffel Tower. The current fair displaced the French-managed Foire Internationale d'Art Contemporain (FIAC), which had occupied the October art fair slot in the Grand Palais for close to half a century in 2022.

The current director of the fair is Karim Crippa. Clément Delépine previously led the fair.

== History ==
In January 2022, the management company of the Grand Palais announced that the parent company of the art fair Art Basel would host an art fair in the venue in October. The Foire Internationale d'Art Contemporain (FIAC), which had long been the flagship French art fair, had traditionally used the venue that time of year.

The announcement that the native-run FIAC was being displaced by a Swiss-managed art fair was met with shock and ambivalence by the Paris-based art community as it meant the demise of a cornerstone of Paris art scene. Philippe Boutté, a Parisian gallery director, called it "sad and violent". In response to the change, the organizers of FIAC, RX Group, released a statement that it: "strongly regrets this decision taken abruptly by the public institution, at the end of a procedure which RX believes was hasty and flawed." Michel Filzi, the president of RX France, said in the statement, “This is a huge disappointment for our teams and all the clients and partners who support us."

Initially the conference was named Paris+ par Art Basel in large part because the seven-year contract between Grand Palais management company and the management of Art Basel stipulated that the fair should not be branded "Art Basel, Paris". French branding agency Yorgo & Company helped the Swiss organizers create the name “Paris+”, which was officially pronounced paree ploos. The + in the name was said to indicate a commitment to bridging the different creative industries, from fine arts to cinema and fashion. The original name of the fair was widely derided as awkward.

Paris+ par Art Basel attracted higher-end galleries and higher-priced works than FIAC was known for. Gallerists said that they had sale prices they had never experienced in the FIAC days. The fair was fully re-branded as Art Basel Paris starting in 2024.

The first director of the event was Clément Delépine, who was the former co-director of Paris Internationale, a highly regarded fair for emerging artists. Art Basel also announced that Jennifer Flay, the long-serving director of FIAC, would join the Paris+’s management team as president of the fair’s advisory board in March 2023.

As the Paris fair under Art Basel management became more established, it began to pull high-end American collectors away from the flagship Swiss fair. Art Basel management noted that is in part because Americans preferred the Paris in the fall over a mid-sized Swiss city in the summer.

Karim Crippa became the director of the fair in November 2025 after the departure of Delépine.

== Paris Art Week ==
The October art fair anchors what is known as "Paris Art Week" which includes satellite fairs such as Paris Internationale, Asia Now and the Salon.

In 2024, it also included a free, public program of exhibitions and installations held in at least nine venues across the city with the fashion brand Miu Miu as an official partner.

== Sections ==
Art Basel Paris is segregated into a number of specific thematic sections.

The Emergence section features "radical work by emerging talents" and is located on the balconies surrounding the central nave of the Grand Palais.

There is also a significant amount of public programming, which is accessible free of charge. These include installations in notable Paris locations, such as the Place Vendôme, which became an outdoor gallery in 2024 for German artist Carsten Höller's Giant Triple Mushroom sculpture.
