= Ma Bourgogne =

Restaurant in Paris, France

Coordinates: 48.8563°N 2.3647°E

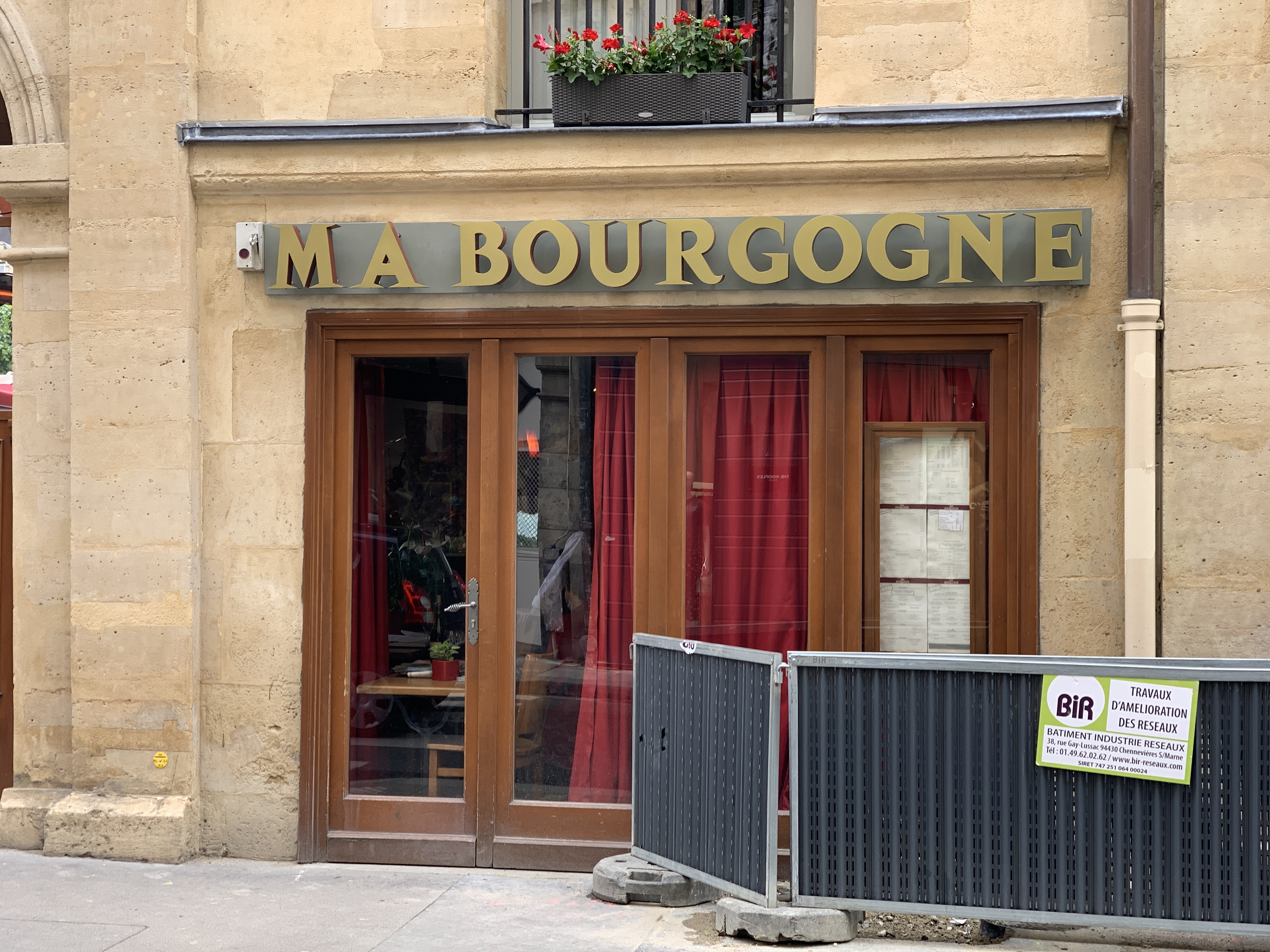
Restaurant Bourgogneư

Ma Bourgogne (French pronunciation: [ma buʁɡɔɲ]) is a bistro in Place des Vosges in the Le Marais district of Paris. It is on the North-West point and is a café in the traditional French style. It has been around for many years and it has been spoken of as one of the best bistros in Paris.

Jean-Paul Sartre and Simone de Beauvoir came here after escaping from a dangerous protest about Algeria.

== See also ==
- Le Marais
- Official Website of Ma Bourgogne
