= The Marais =

Historic district in Paris, France

Coordinates: 48°51′36″N 02°21′39″E

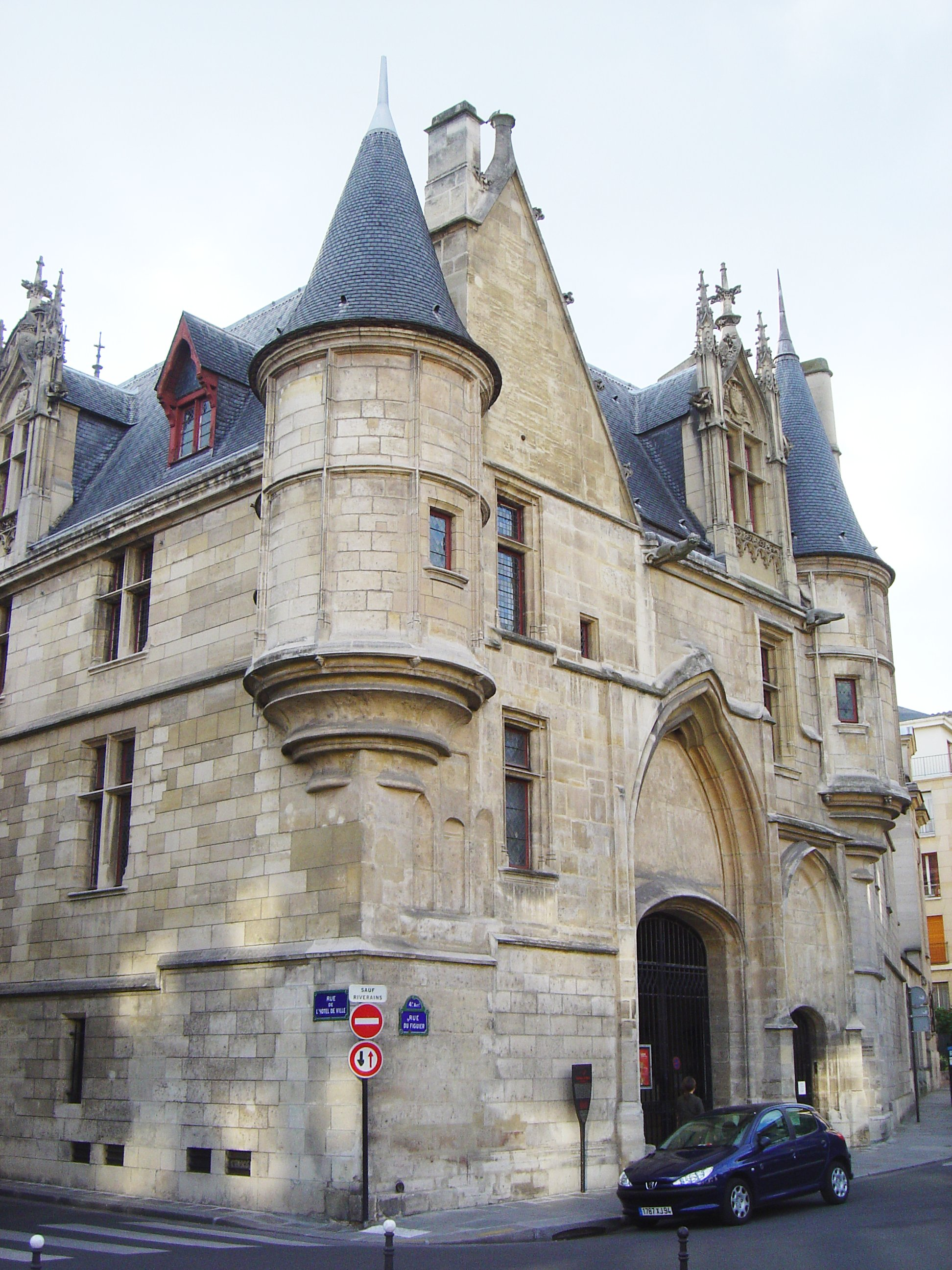
Hôtel de Sens

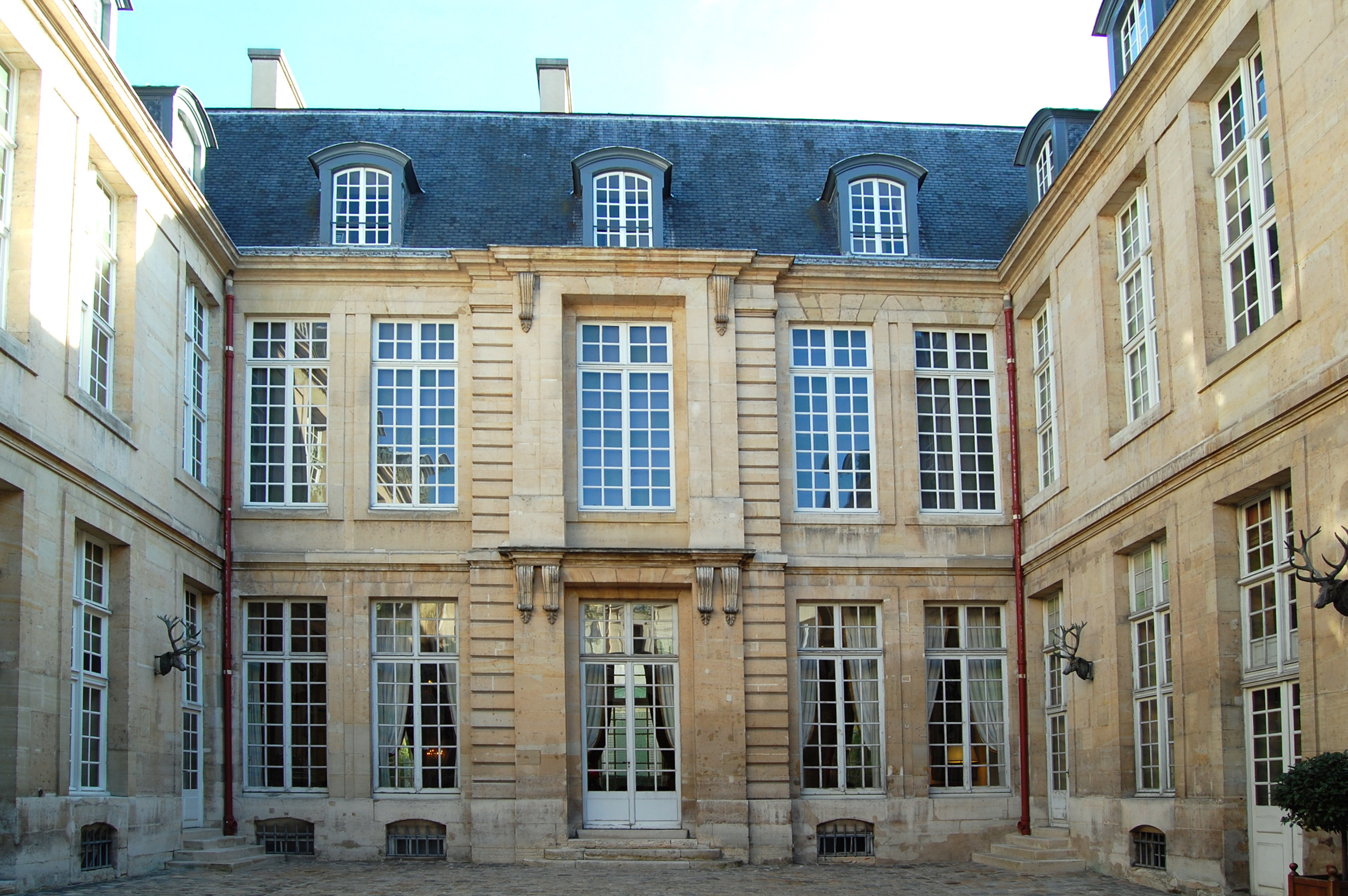
Hôtel de Guénégaud

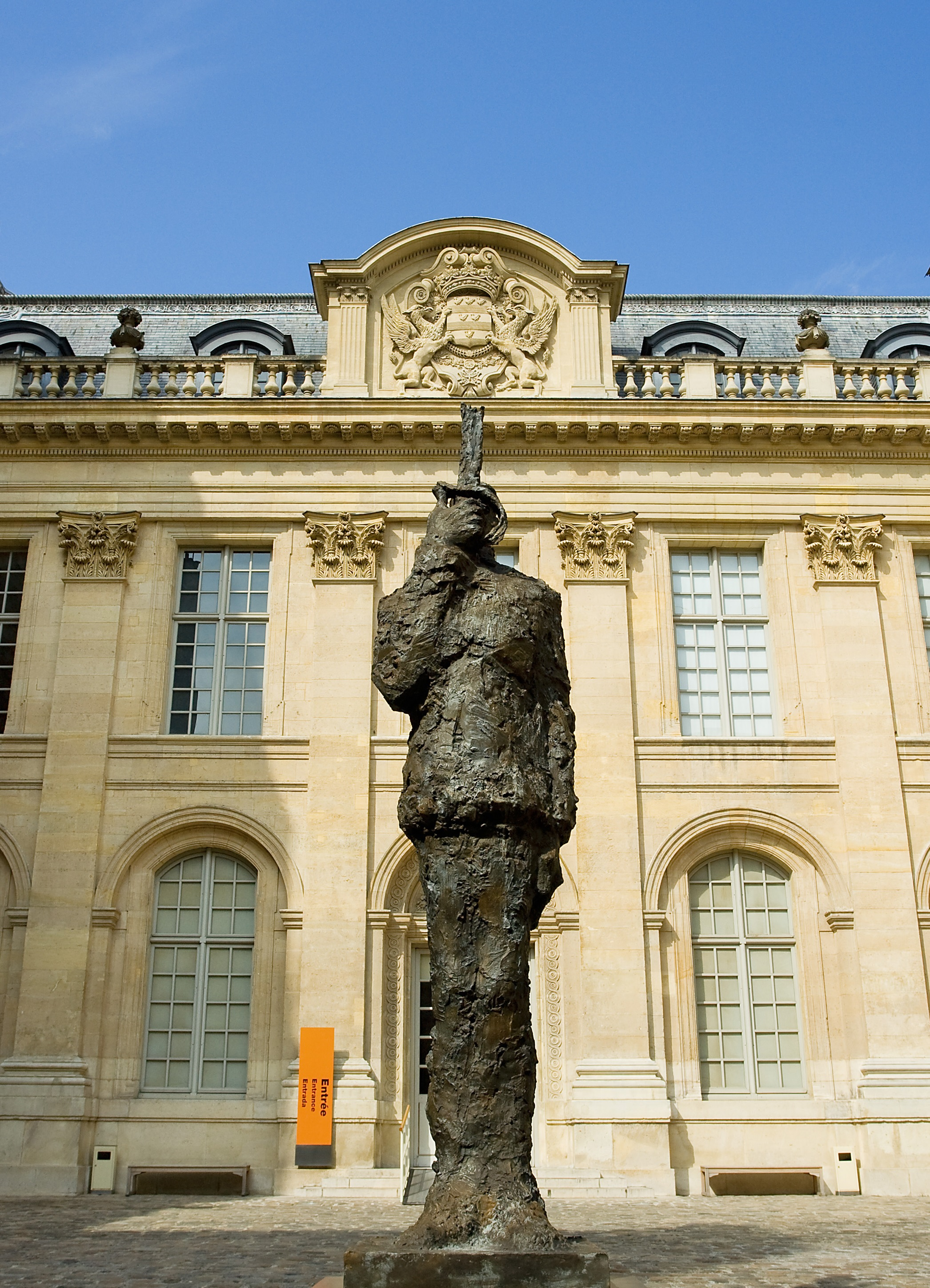
The Hôtel de Saint-Aignan, housing the Museum of Jewish Art and History

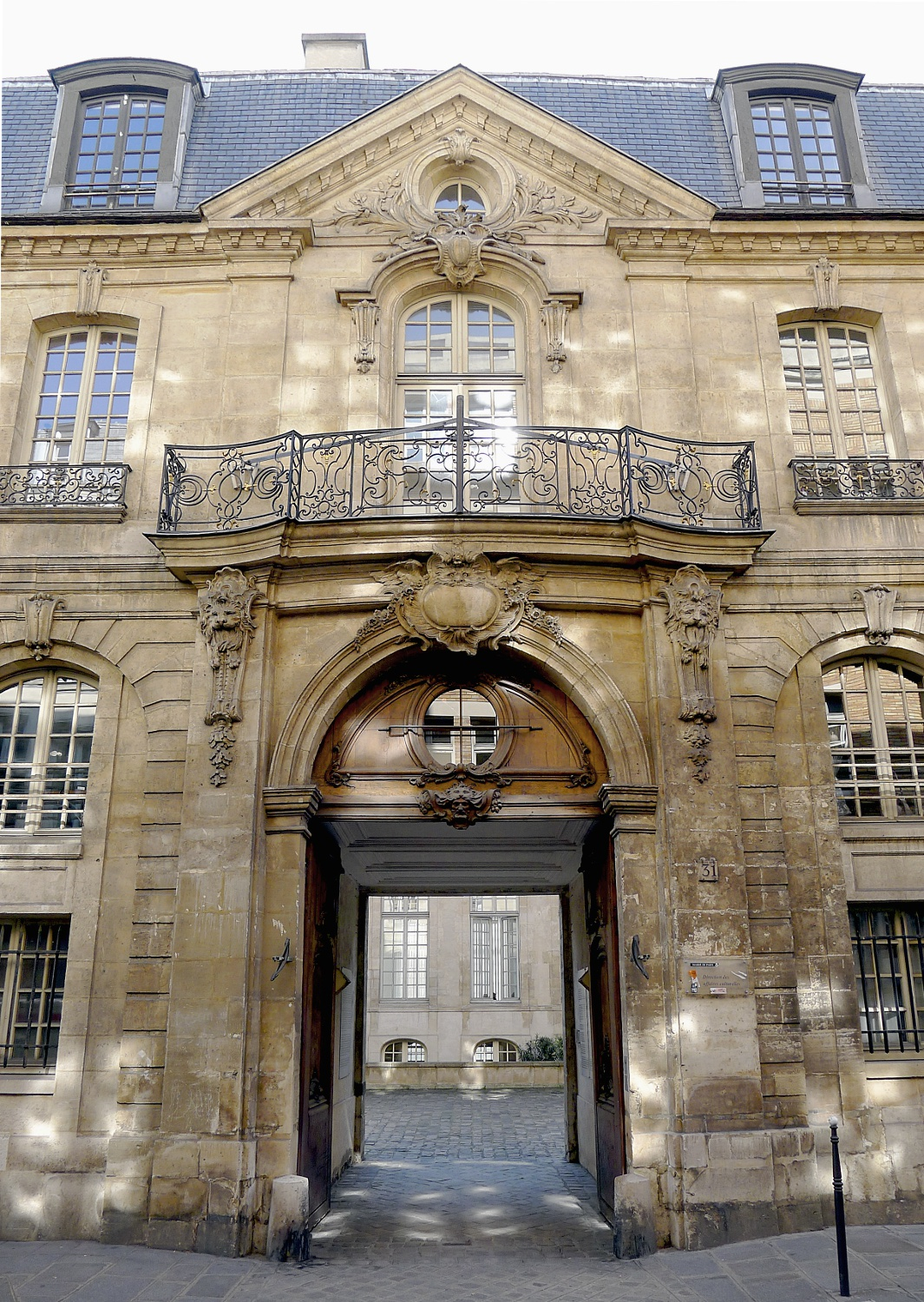
Entrance of the Hôtel d'Albret

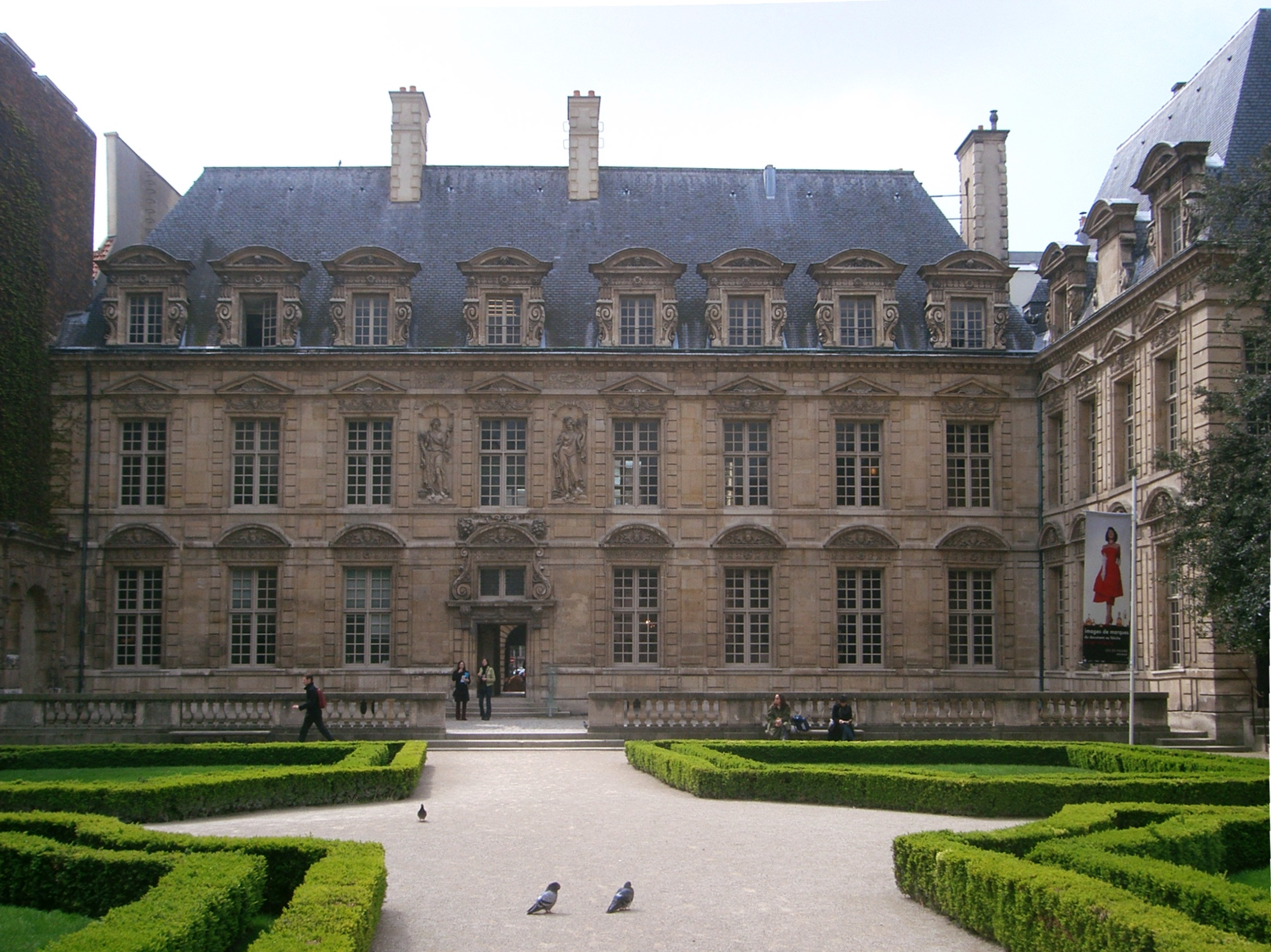
The Hôtel de Sully's gardens, near the Place des Vosges

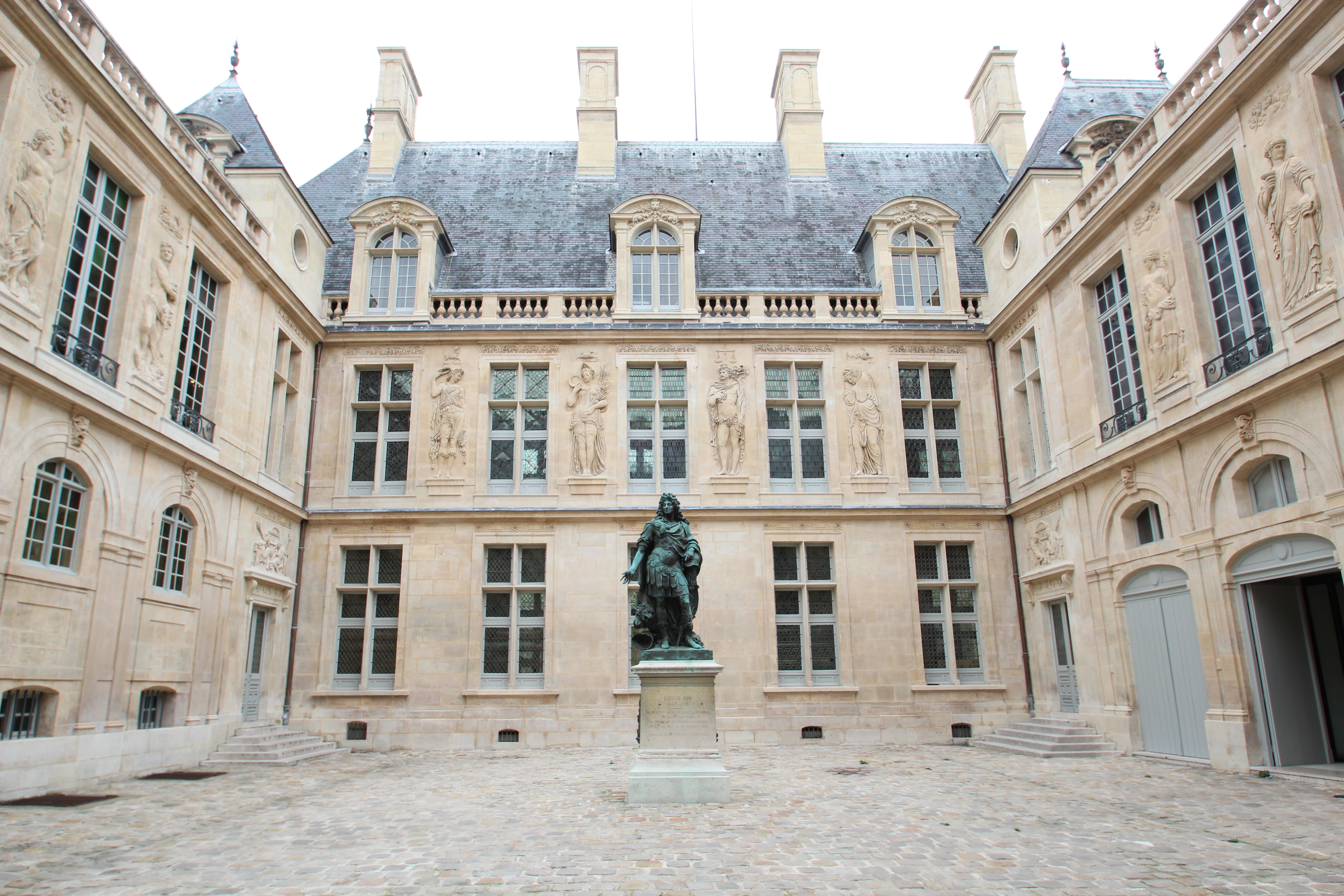
The courtyard of the Hôtel Carnavalet

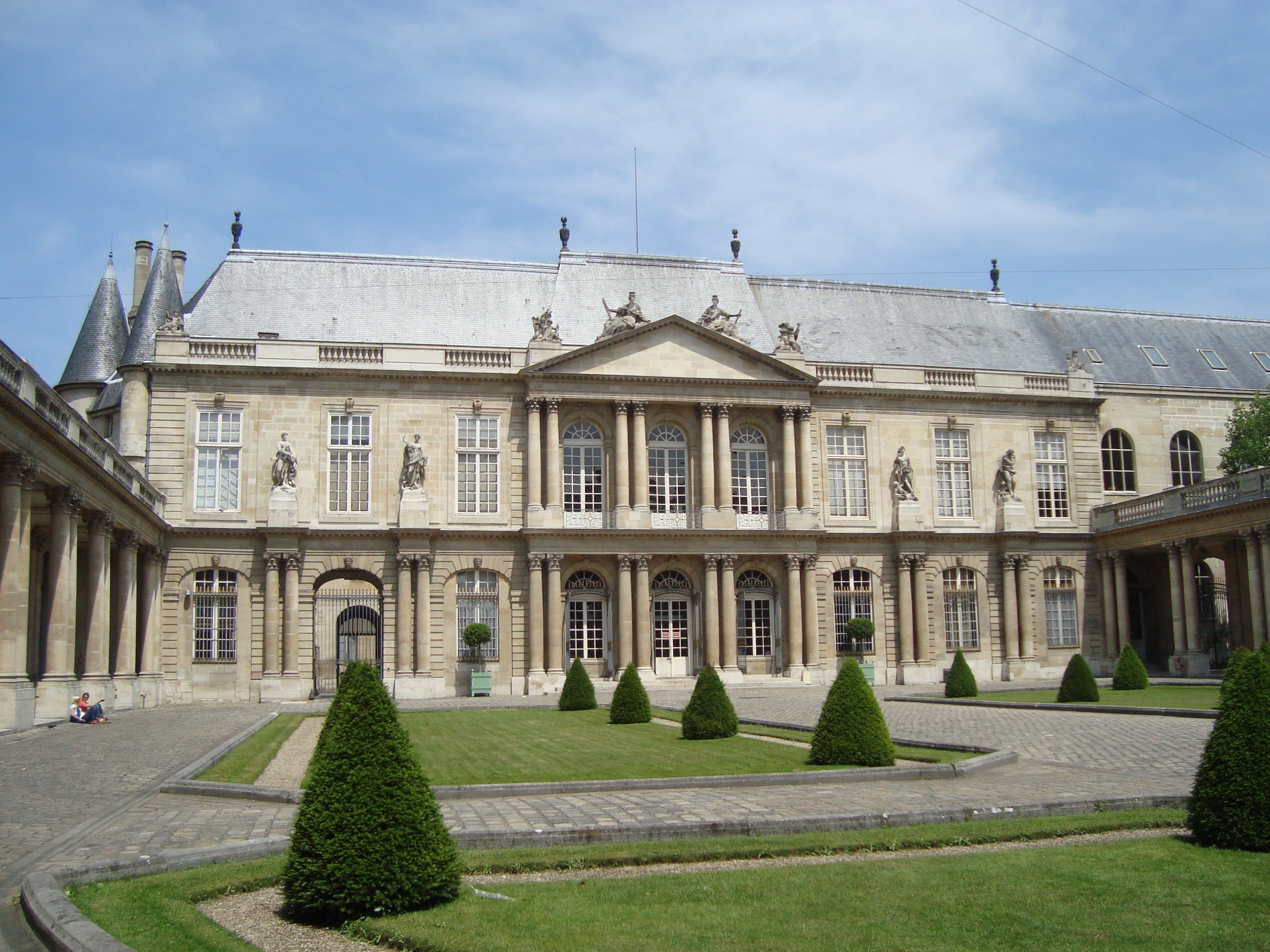
The corps de logis of the Hôtel de Soubise

The Marais (Le Marais French: [lə maʁɛ]; "the marsh") is a historic district in Paris, France. It spreads across parts of the 3rd and 4th arrondissements on the Rive Droite, or Right Bank, of the Seine. Having once been an aristocratic district, it is home to many buildings of historic and architectural importance. It lost its status as a fashionable district in the late 18th century, with only minor nobles calling the area home. After the French Revolution, the district fell into disrepair and was abandoned by nobility. After a long period of decay, the district has undergone transformation in recent years and is now once again amongst the more fashionable areas of Paris, known for its art galleries, upscale restaurants and museums.

== History ==
=== Paris aristocratic district ===
In 1240, the Knights Templar built a fortified church just outside the walls of Paris, in the northern part of the Marais. Later on, The Temple (also known as the Temple Quarter) had many religious institutions built nearby. These include: the convents des Blancs-Manteaux, de Sainte-Croix-de-la-Bretonnerie and des Carmes-Billettes, as well as the church of Sainte-Catherine-du-Val-des-Écoliers.

During the mid-13th century, Charles I of Anjou, King of Naples and Sicily, and brother of King Louis IX of France built his residence near the current n°7 rue de Sévigné. In 1361, King Charles V built a mansion known as the Hôtel Saint-Pol, in which the Royal Court settled during his reign (as well as his son's).

From that time to the 17th century and especially after the Royal Square (Place Royale, current place des Vosges) was designed under King Henri IV of France in 1605, the Marais was the favoured place of residence of the French nobility. Among the many urban mansions—hôtels particuliers, in French—they built there were the Hôtel de Sens, the Hôtel de Sully, the Hôtel de Beauvais, the Hôtel Carnavalet, the Hôtel de Guénégaud and the Hôtel de Soubise.

During the late 18th century, the district was no longer considered the most fashionable district by the nobility, yet it still kept its reputation of being an aristocratic area. By that time, only minor nobles and a few higher ranking nobles, such as the Prince de Soubise, lived there. The Place des Vosges remained a place for nobles to meet. The district fell into disrepair after the French Revolution and was then abandoned by the nobility completely. It was to remain unfashionable until the late 20th century.

=== Jewish community ===
After the French Revolution, the district was no longer the aristocratic district it had been during the 17th and 18th centuries. Because of this, the district became a popular and active commercial area, hosting one of Paris' main Jewish communities. At the end of the 19th century and during the first half of the 20th, the district around the rue des Rosiers, referred to as the "Pletzl", welcomed many Eastern European Jews (Ashkenazi) who reinforced the district's clothing specialization. During World War II the Jewish community was targeted by the Nazis who were occupying France. As of today, the rue des Rosiers remains a major center of the Paris Jewish community, which has made a comeback since the 1990s. Public notices announce Jewish events, bookshops specialize in Jewish books, and numerous restaurants and other outlets sell kosher food.

The synagogue on 10 rue Pavée is adjacent to the rue des Rosiers. It was designed in 1913 by Art Nouveau architect Hector Guimard, who designed many Paris Metro stations. The Marais houses the Museum of Jewish Art and History, the largest French museum of Jewish art and history. The museum conveys the extensive history and culture of Jews in Europe and North Africa from the Middle Ages to the 20th century.

Cnaan Lipshiz of Times of Israel wrote that in previous eras the district was "the beating heart of French Jewry".

In 1982, Palestinian extremists murdered six people and injured 22 at a Jewish restaurant in the Marais, Chez Jo Goldenberg, an attack which evidenced ties to the Abu Nidal Organization.

By 2019 much Jewish business activity left The Marais, and it had fewer Jewish residents.

=== Post-war rehabilitation ===
By the 1950s, the district had become a working-class area and most of its architectural masterpieces were in a state of neglect. In 1964, General de Gaulle's Culture Minister, Andre Malraux, made the Marais the first secteur sauvegardé (literally translated as safeguarded sector). That was meant to protect and conserve places deemed to be of special cultural significance. In the following decades, the government and the city led an active restoration and Rehabilitation Policy.

The main hôtels particuliers have since been restored and turned into museums: the Hôtel Salé hosts the Picasso Museum, the Hôtel Carnavalet the Paris Historical Museum, the Hôtel Donon the Cognacq-Jay Museum, and the Hôtel de Saint-Aignan hosts the Musée d'Art et d'Histoire du Judaïsme. The site of Beaubourg, the western part of Marais, was chosen for the Centre Georges Pompidou, France's national Museum of Modern Art, which is widely considered one of the world's most important cultural institutions. The building was completed in 1977 with advanced modern architectural features by Renzo Piano and Richard Rogers.

=== Present day ===
The Marais is a frequented localities for art galleries in Paris. Following its restoration, the Marais has now become a popular and culture-defining district, home to many upscale restaurants, museums, fashion houses, and galleries.

The Marais is also known for its Chinese community, which first formed during World War I. At that time, France needed workers on the home front to perform the duties previously filled by men who were now soldiers on the front lines. China sent a few thousand of its citizens, on the condition that they would not actually take part in the war. Following the 1918 Allied victory, some of them stayed in Paris, living around the current rue au Maire. Today, most work in jewellery and leather-related products. The Marais' Chinese community has mainly settled in the north of the district, particularly in the vicinity of Place de la République. Next to it, on the Rue du Temple, is the Chinese Church of Paris.

Other features of the neighborhood include the Musée Picasso, the house of Nicolas Flamel, the Musée Cognacq-Jay, and the Musée Carnavalet.

== LGBT culture ==
The Marais became a center of LGBT culture, beginning in the 1980s. Florence Tamagne, author of "Paris: 'Resting on its Laurels'?", wrote that the Marais "is less a 'village' where one lives and works than an entrance to a pleasure area" and that this differentiates it from Anglo-American gay villages. Tamagne added that like US gay villages, the Marais has "an emphasis on 'commercialism, gay pride and coming-out of the closet'". Le Dépôt, one of the largest cruising bars in Europe as of 2014 (per Tamagne), is in the Marais area.

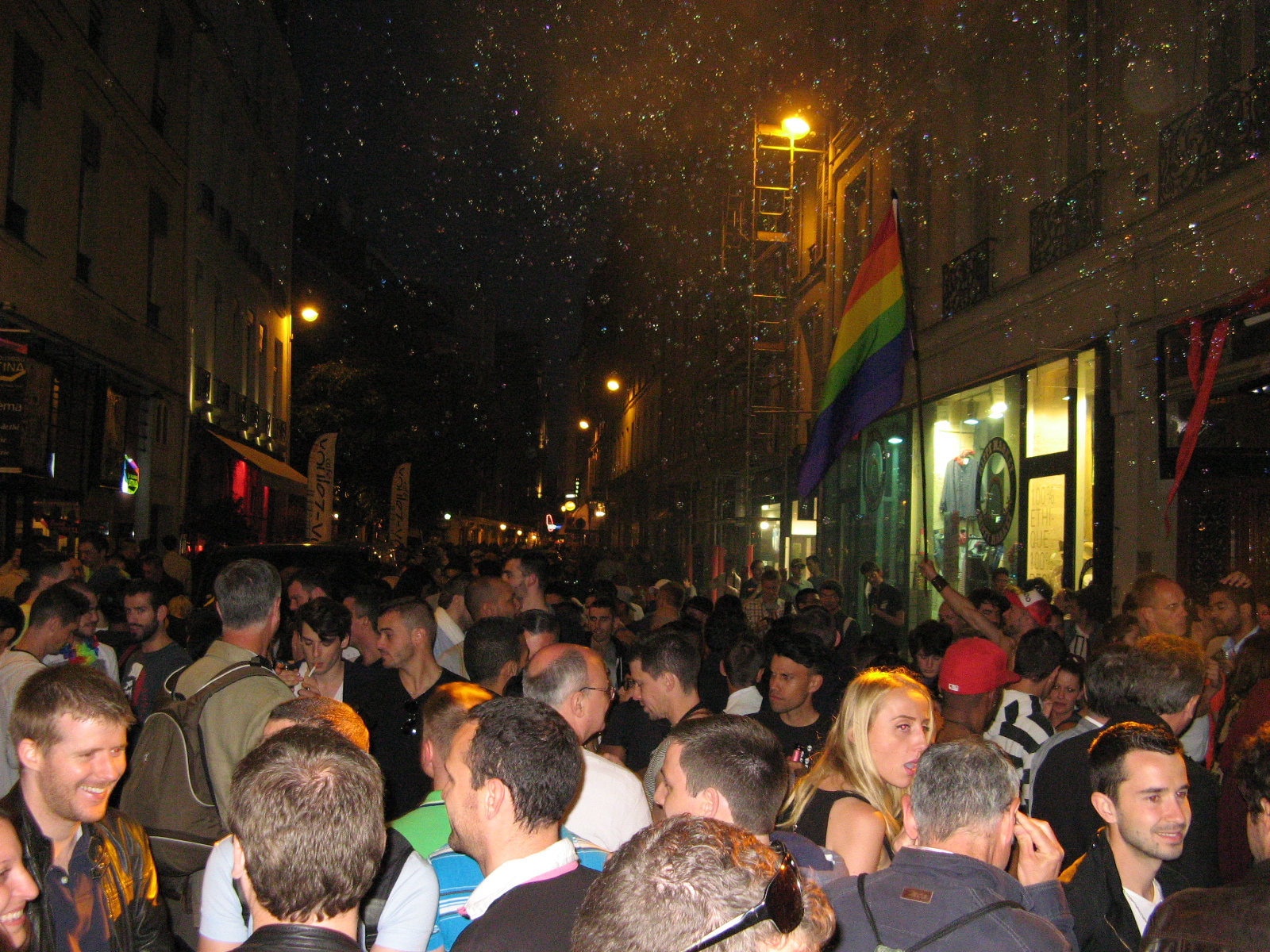
Gay village in the Marais, 2013

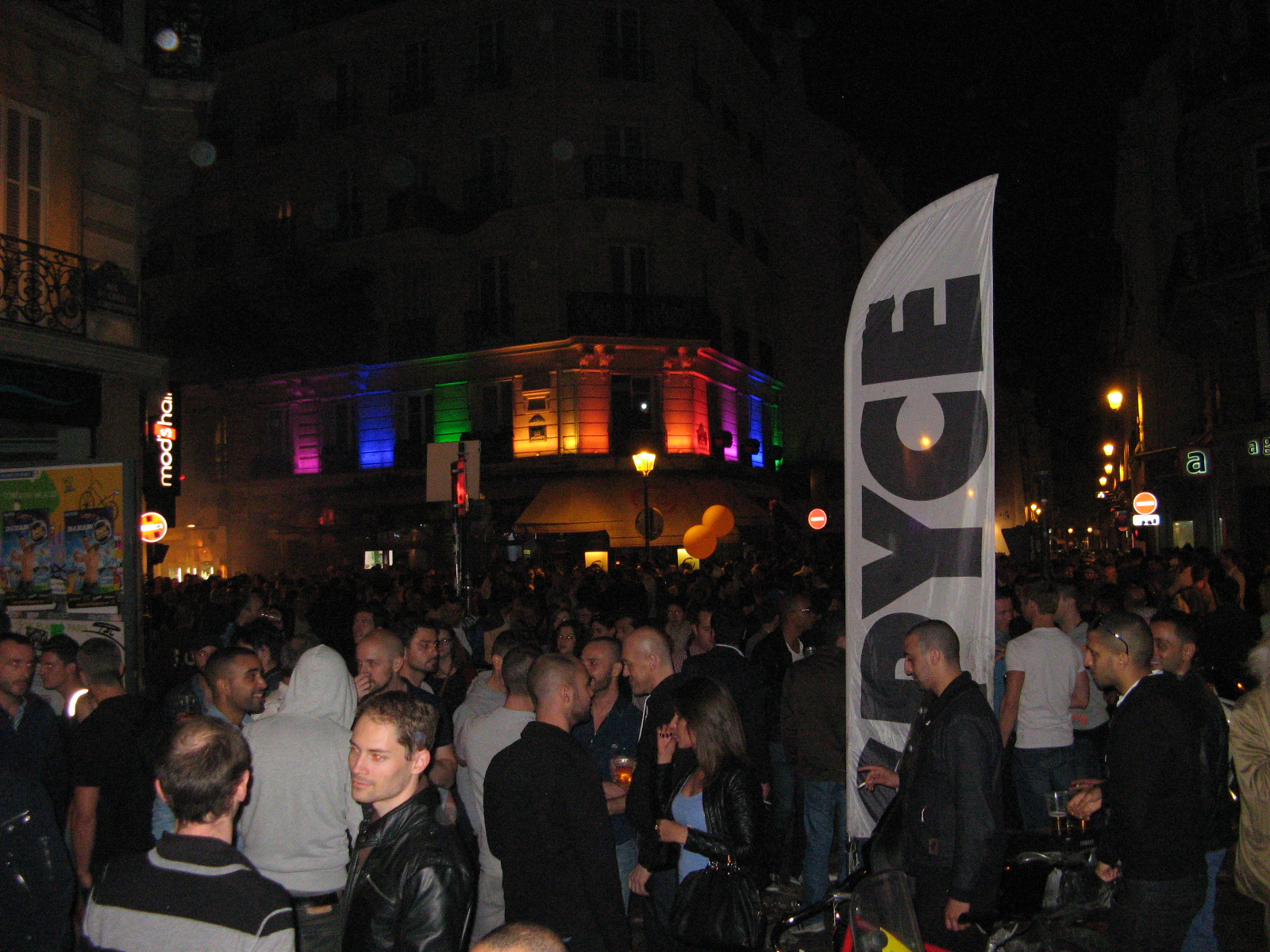
Gay village in the Marais, 2013

== Notable residents ==
- Maximilien de Béthune, duc de Sully^{†}
- Urbain de Maillé-Brézé^{†}
- Marie de Rabutin-Chantal, marquise de Sévigné^{†}
- Armand de Vignerot du Plessis^{†}
- Catherine de Vivonne, marquise de Rambouillet^{†}
- Jacques Frémontier^{†}
- John Galliano
- Victor Hugo^{†}
- Jack Lang
- Jessica Lange
- Jim Morrison^{†}
- Maximilien Robespierre^{†}
- Princes of Rohan Soubise
- Dominique Strauss-Kahn and Anne Sinclair

== Places and monuments of note ==
- National Archives, including the Hôtel de Soubise and Hôtel de Rohan
- Carnavalet Museum
- Church Notre-Dame-des-Blancs-Manteaux
- Church of St-Gervais-et-St-Protais
- Church Saint-Merri
- Church of Saint-Nicolas-des-Champs
- Church of Saint-Paul-Saint-Louis
- Hôtel d'Angoulême Lamoignon (housing the Bibliothèque Historique de la Ville de Paris and the Hôtel-Lamoignon - Mark Ashton Garden.
- Hôtel d'Aumont
- Hôtel de Beauvais
- Hôtel de Sens
- Hôtel de Sully
- Place des Vosges, including the home of Victor Hugo and Café Ma Bourgogne
- Maison européenne de la photographie in the Hôtel de Camtobre (1706)
- Mémorial de la Shoah, including the Memorial of the Unknown Jewish Martyr and the CDJC
- Musée Cognacq-Jay
- Musée d'Art et d'Histoire du Judaïsme (housed in the Hôtel de Saint-Aignan)
- Musée des Arts et Métiers
- Musée Picasso
- Place des Émeutes-de-Stonewall (Stonewall riots square)
- Place Harvey Milk
- Pletzl, the historic Jewish quarter
- Rosiers – Joseph Migneret Garden
- Temple du Marais

== Gallery ==
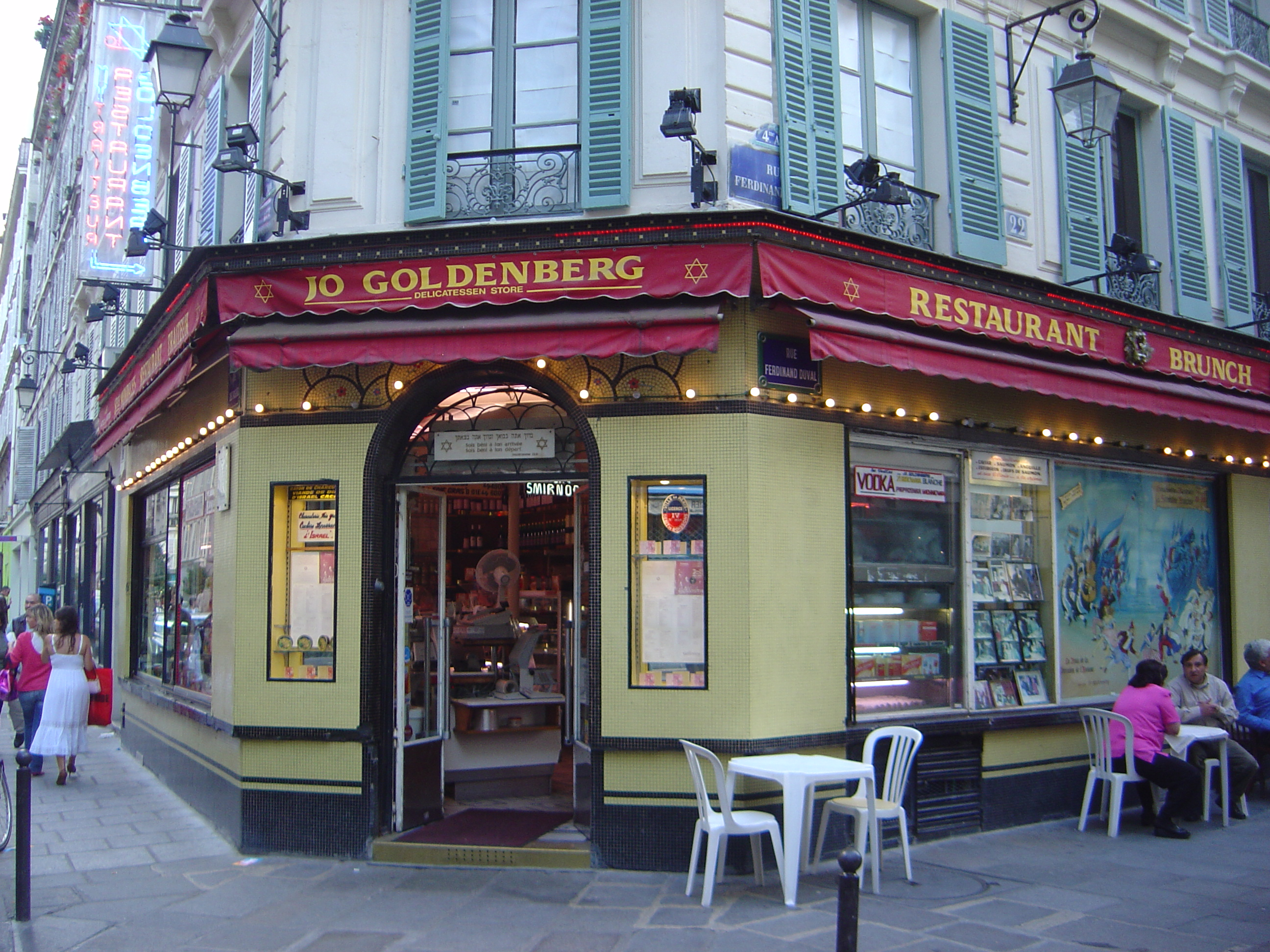
Jo Goldenberg's Jewish delicatessen (now defunct) on the rue des Rosiers; site of the Goldenberg restaurant attack

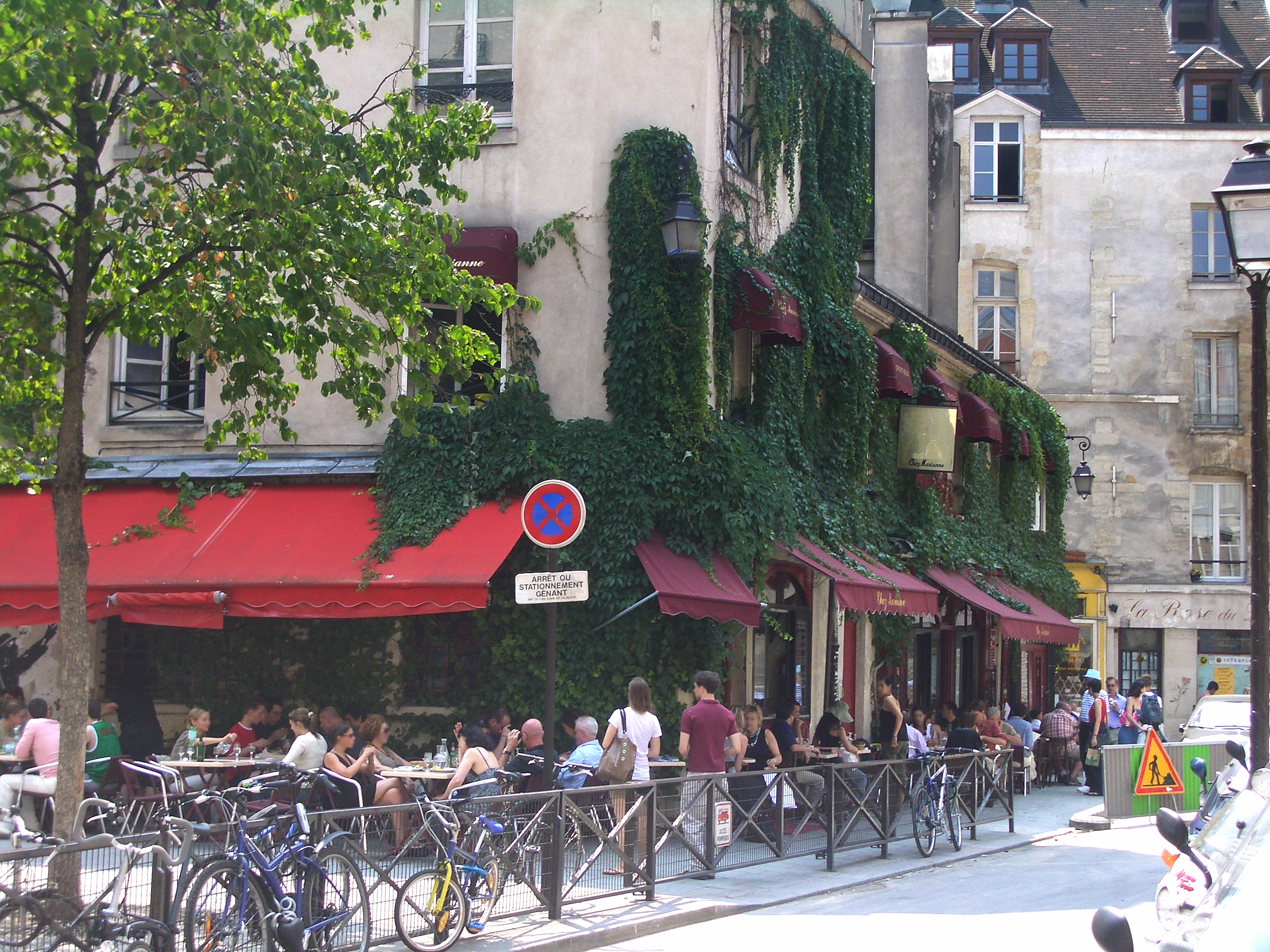
Chez Marianne, a Jewish restaurant in Le Marais

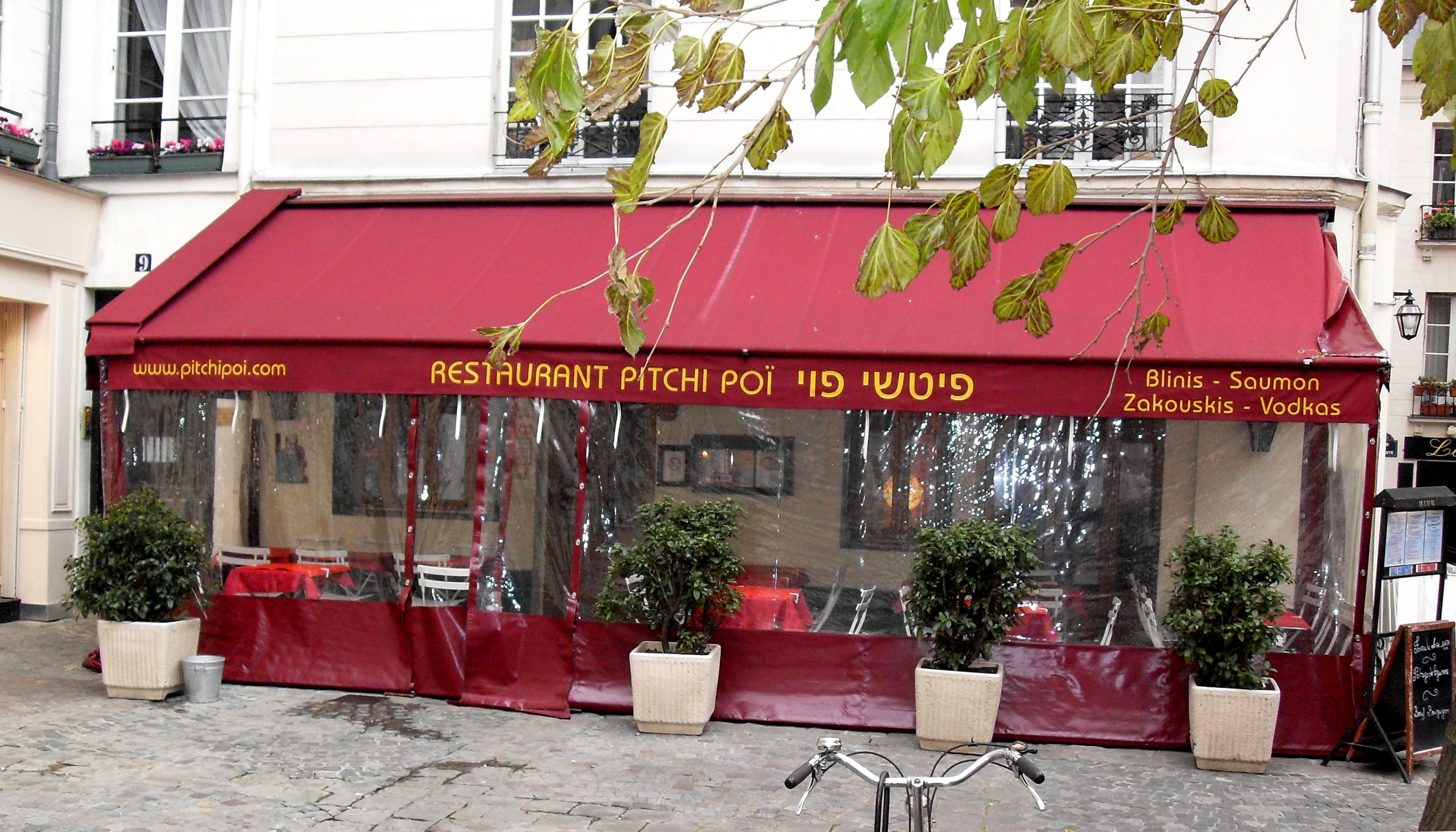
Restaurant Pitchi Poï in the predominantly Jewish Pletzl quarter

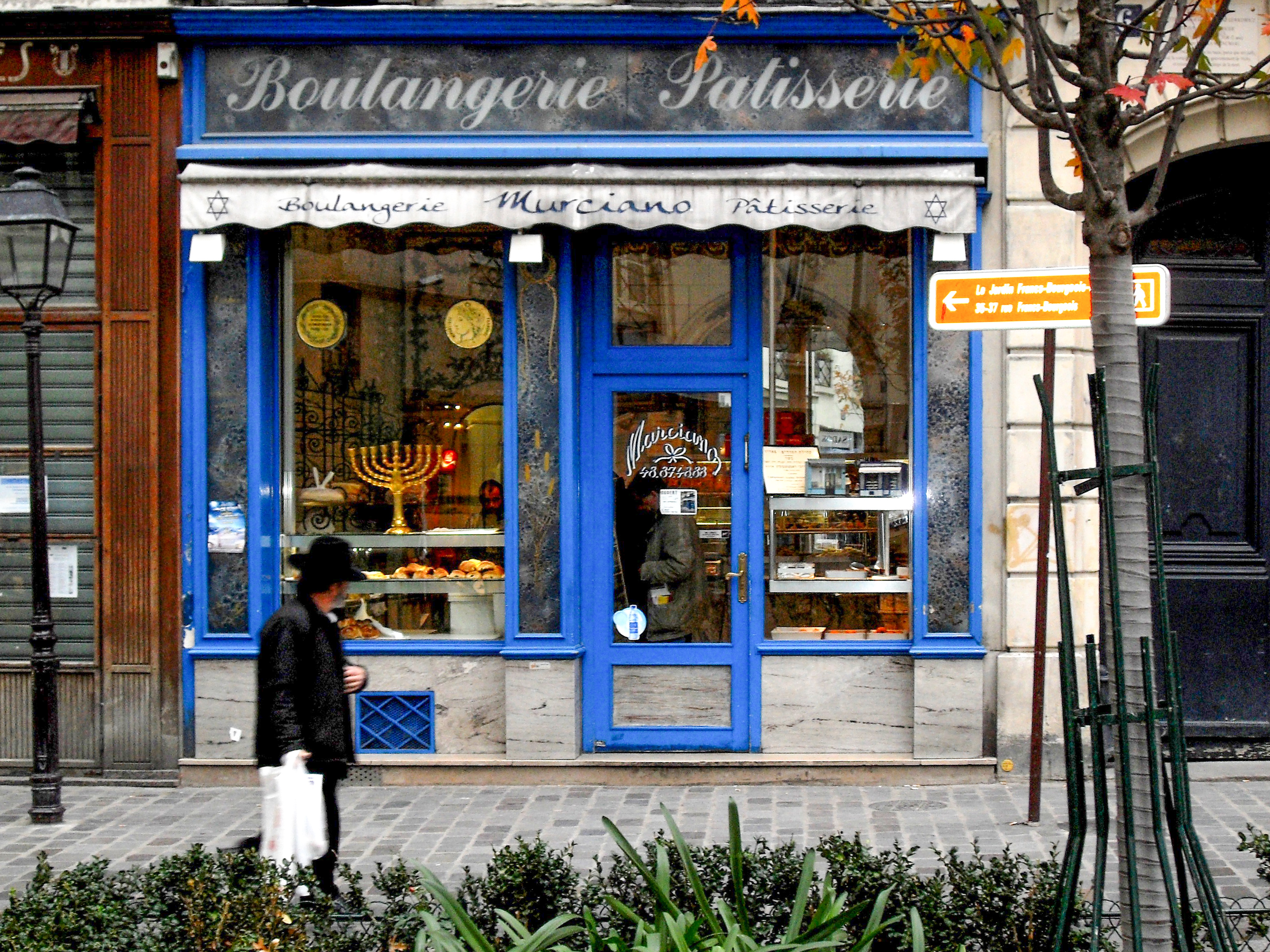
Murciano Jewish bakery in the rue des Rosiers

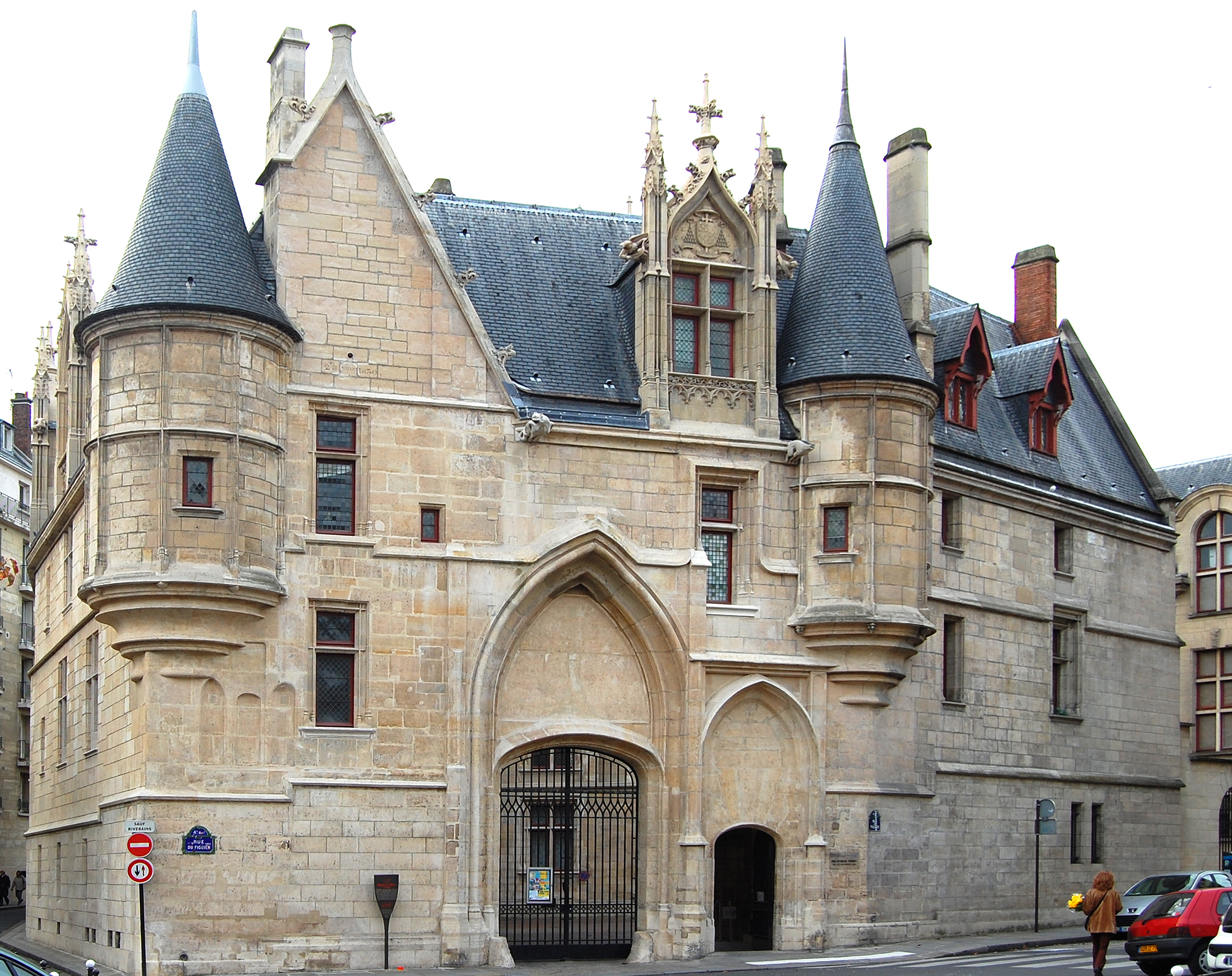
Hôtel de Sens

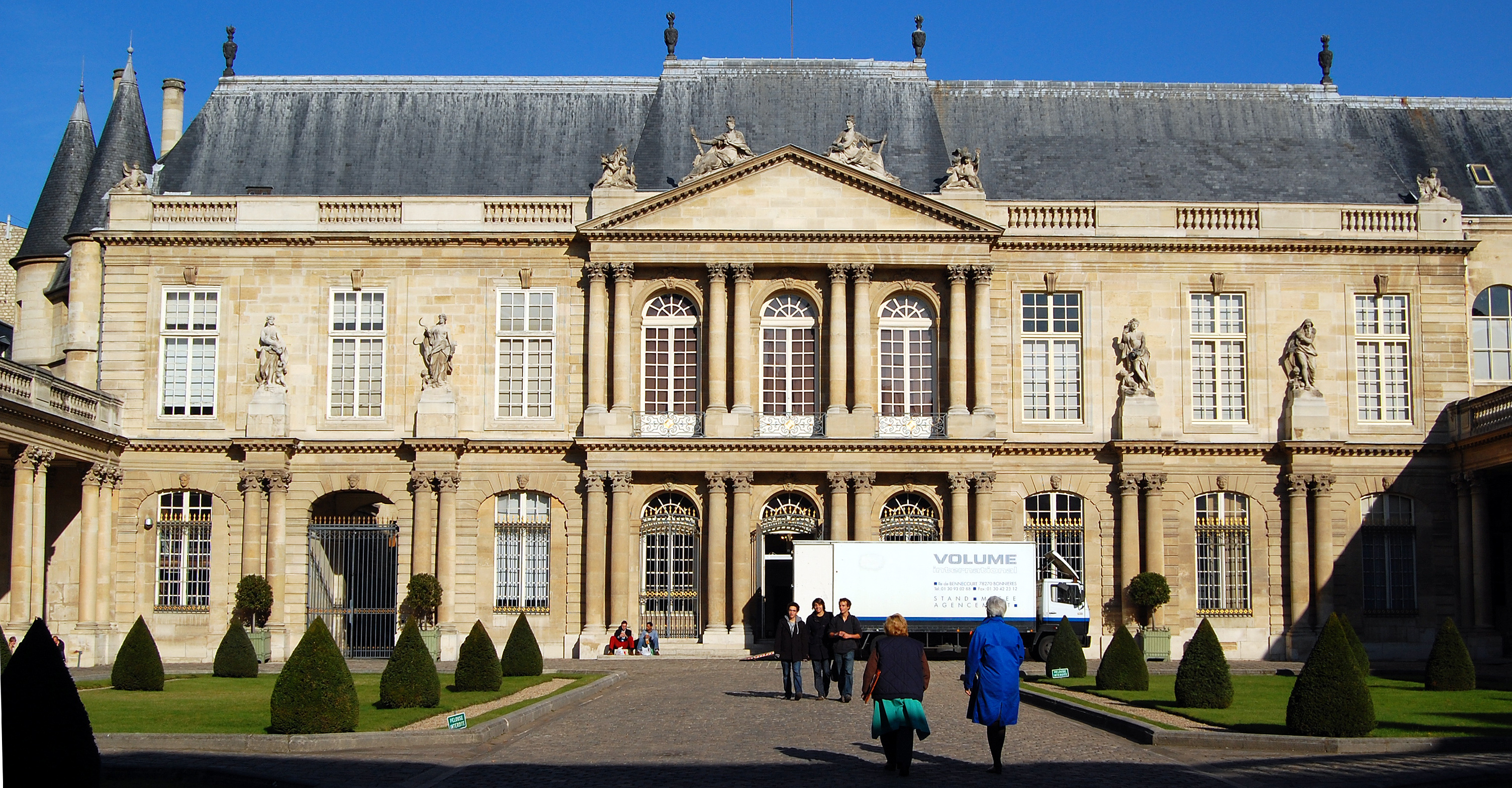
Hôtel Soubise

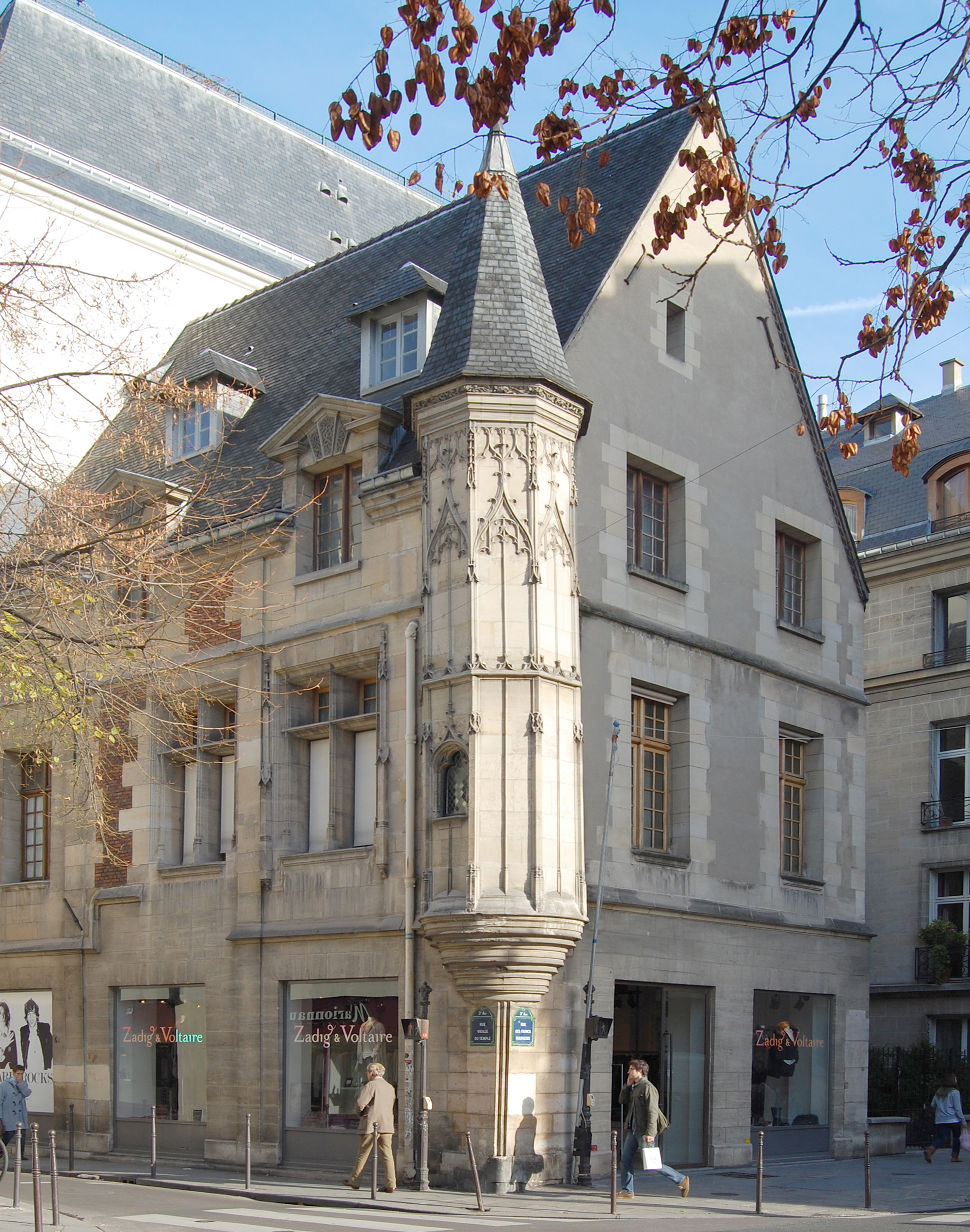
Maison de Jean Herouet

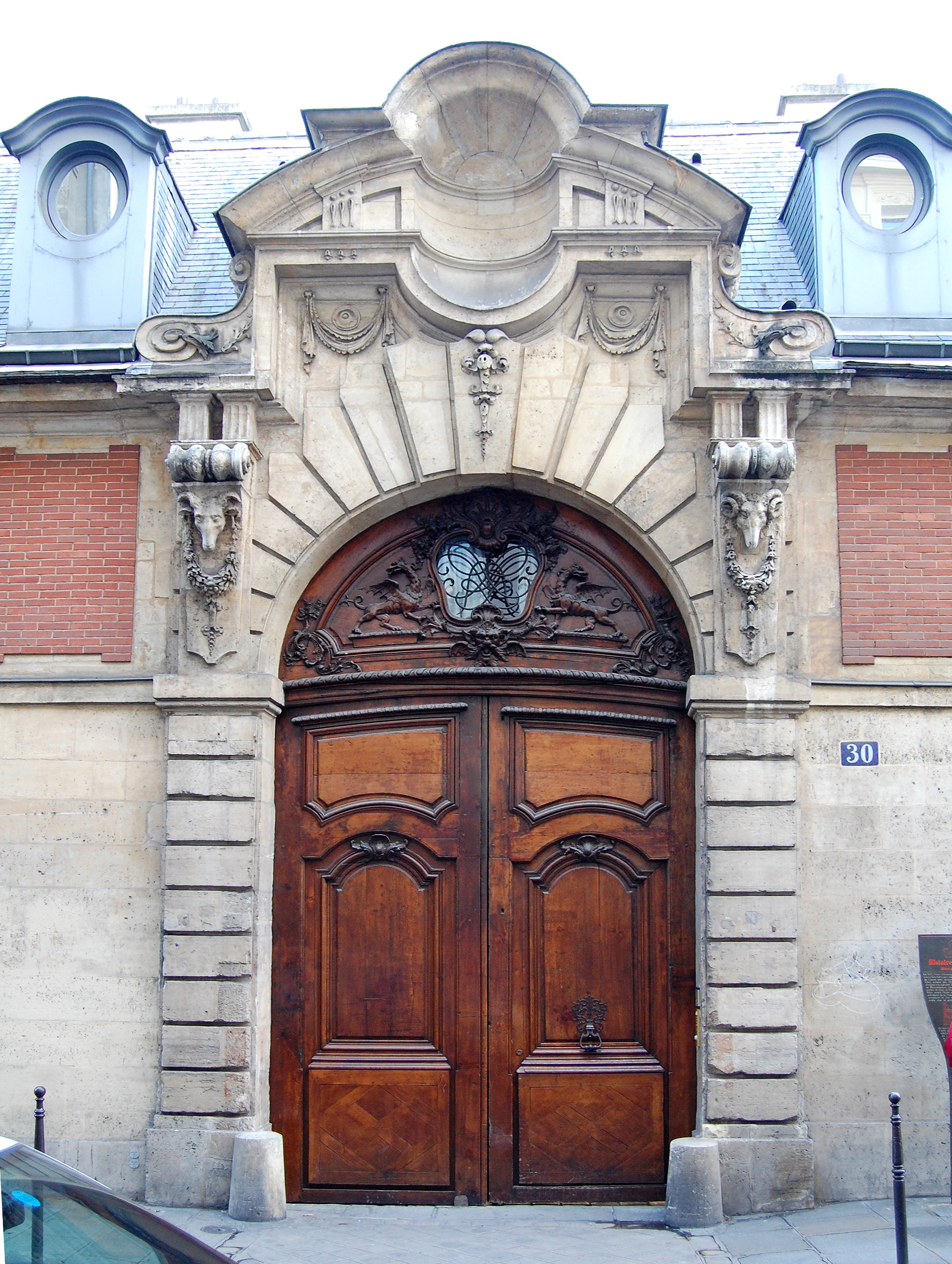
Entrance of l'Hôtel d'Almeras

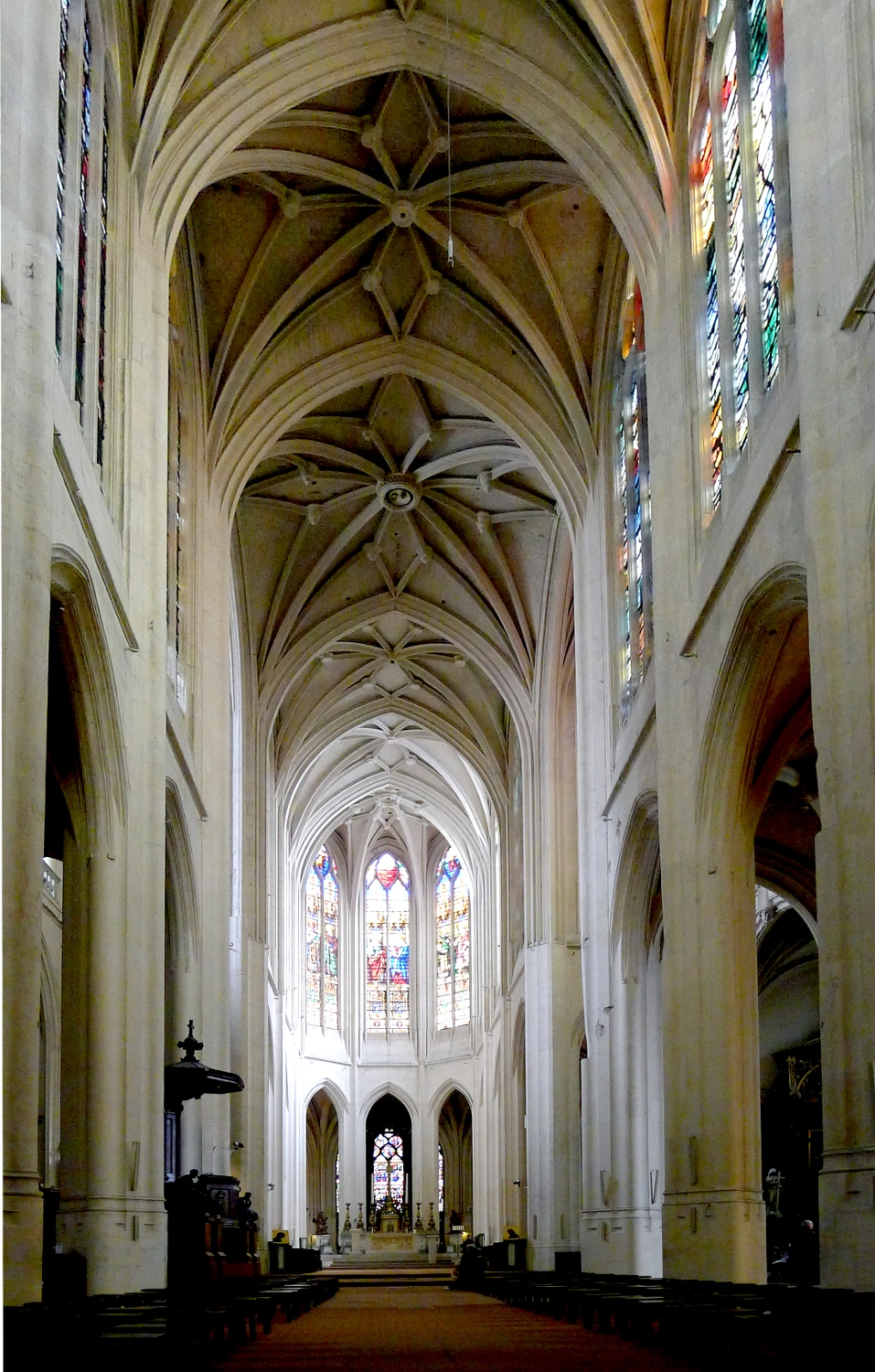
Interior of Saint-Gervais-et-Saint-Protais Church

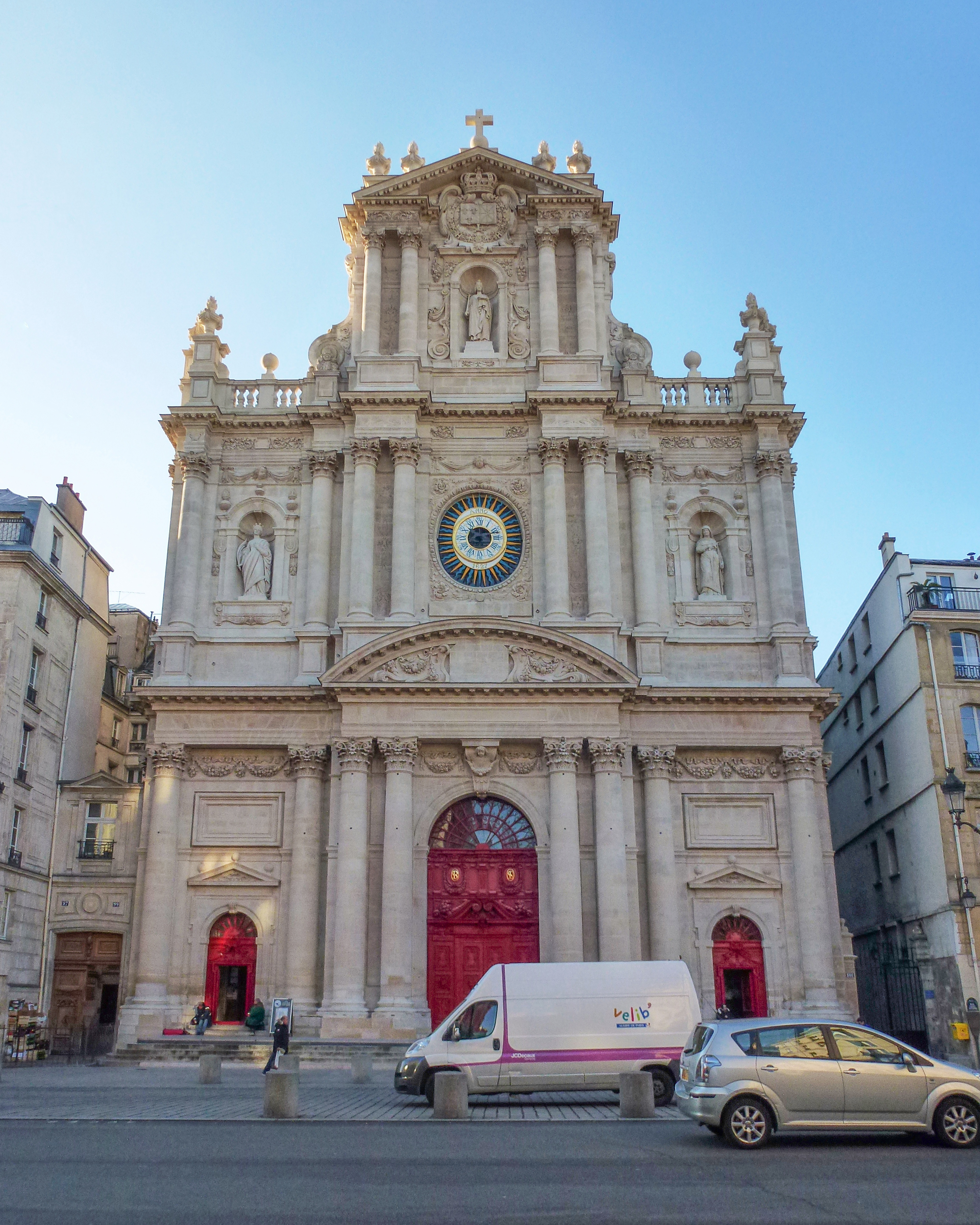
Saint-Paul Saint-Louis Church

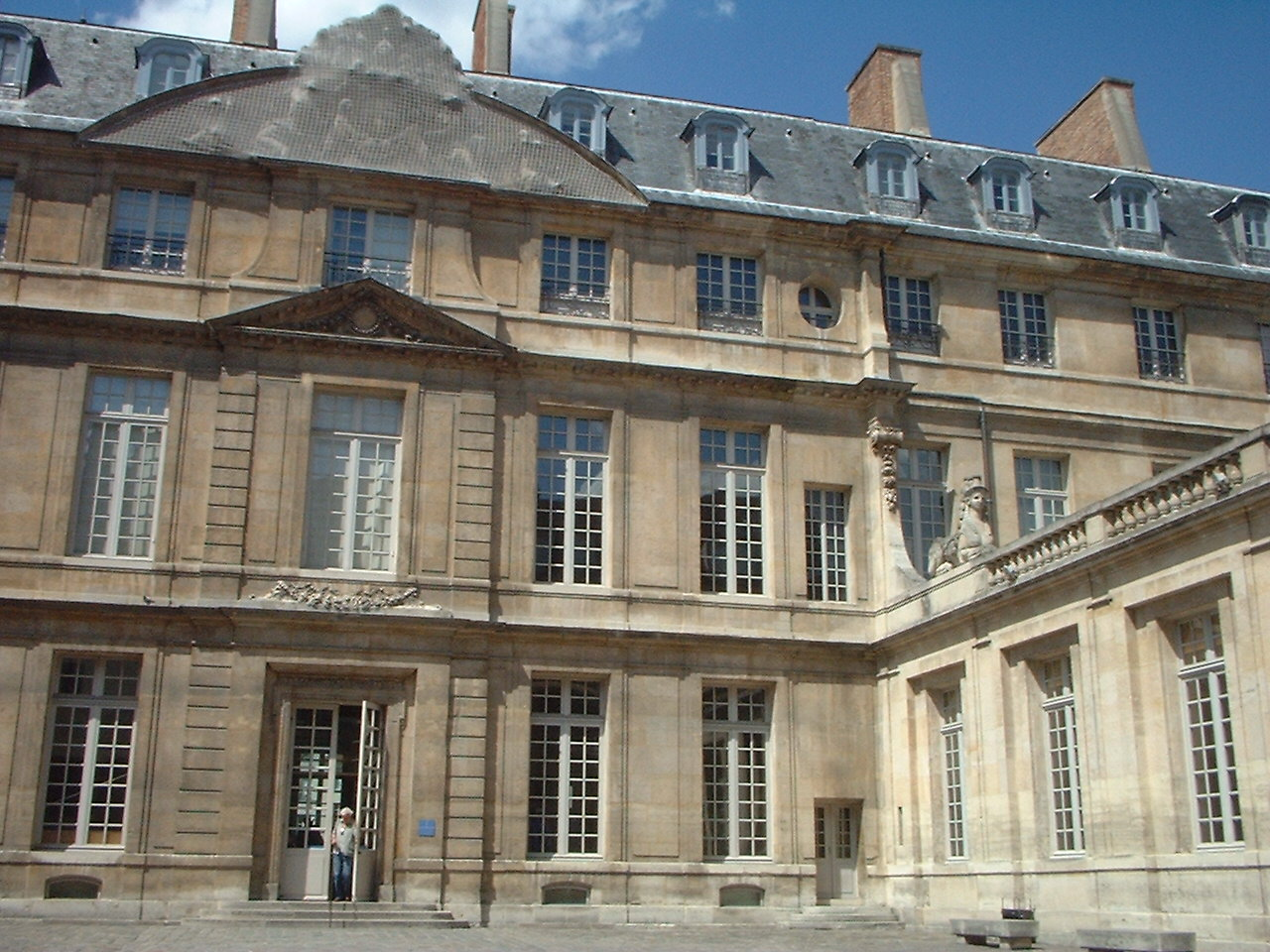
Hôtel Salé (Picasso Museum)

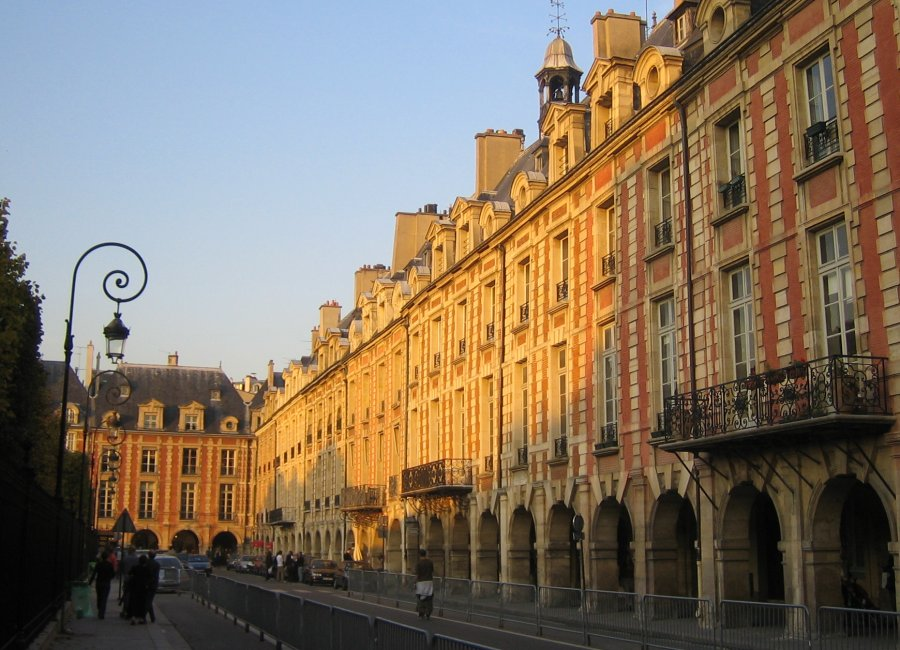
Place des Vosges

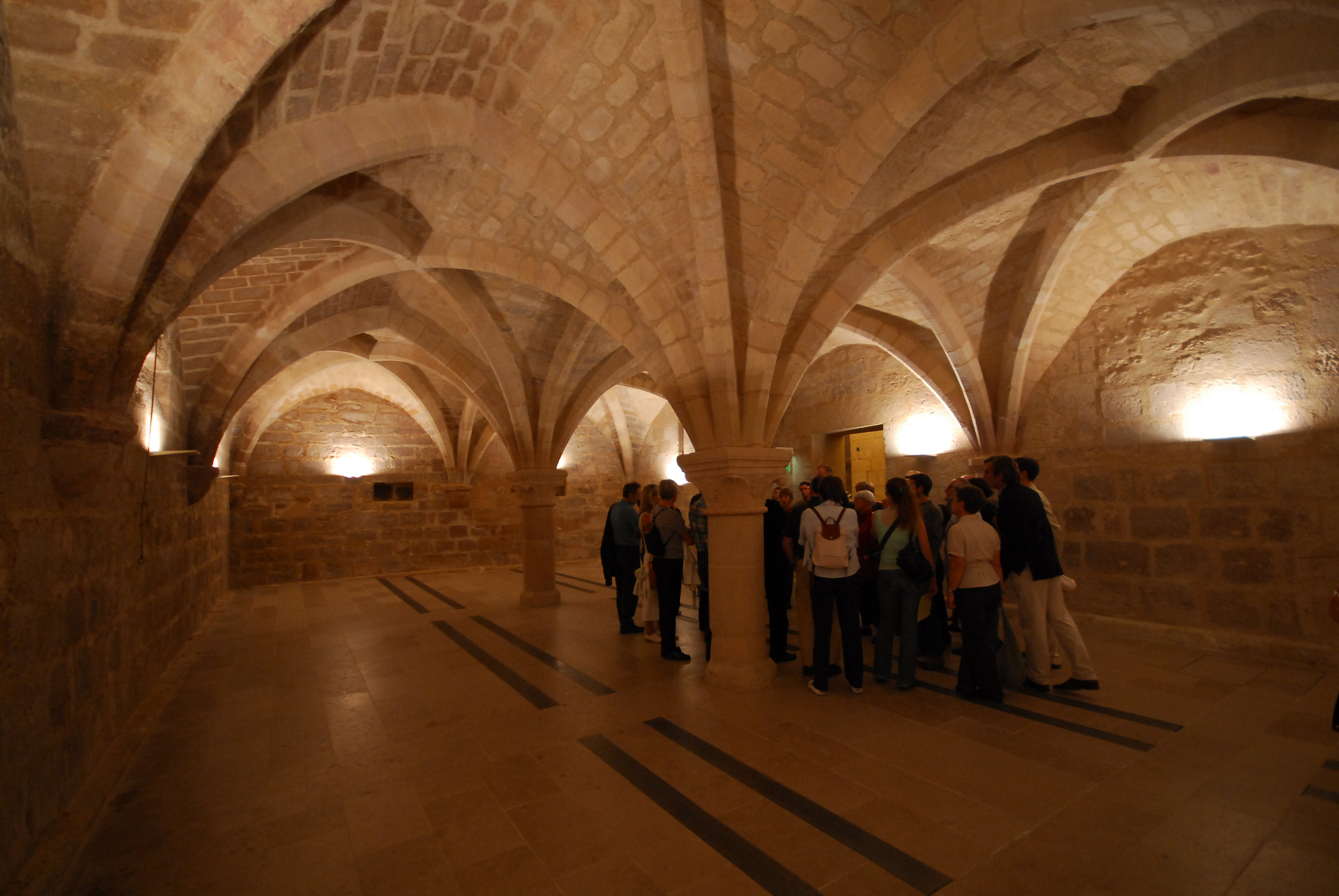
Medieval cellar of the Hôtel de Beauvais

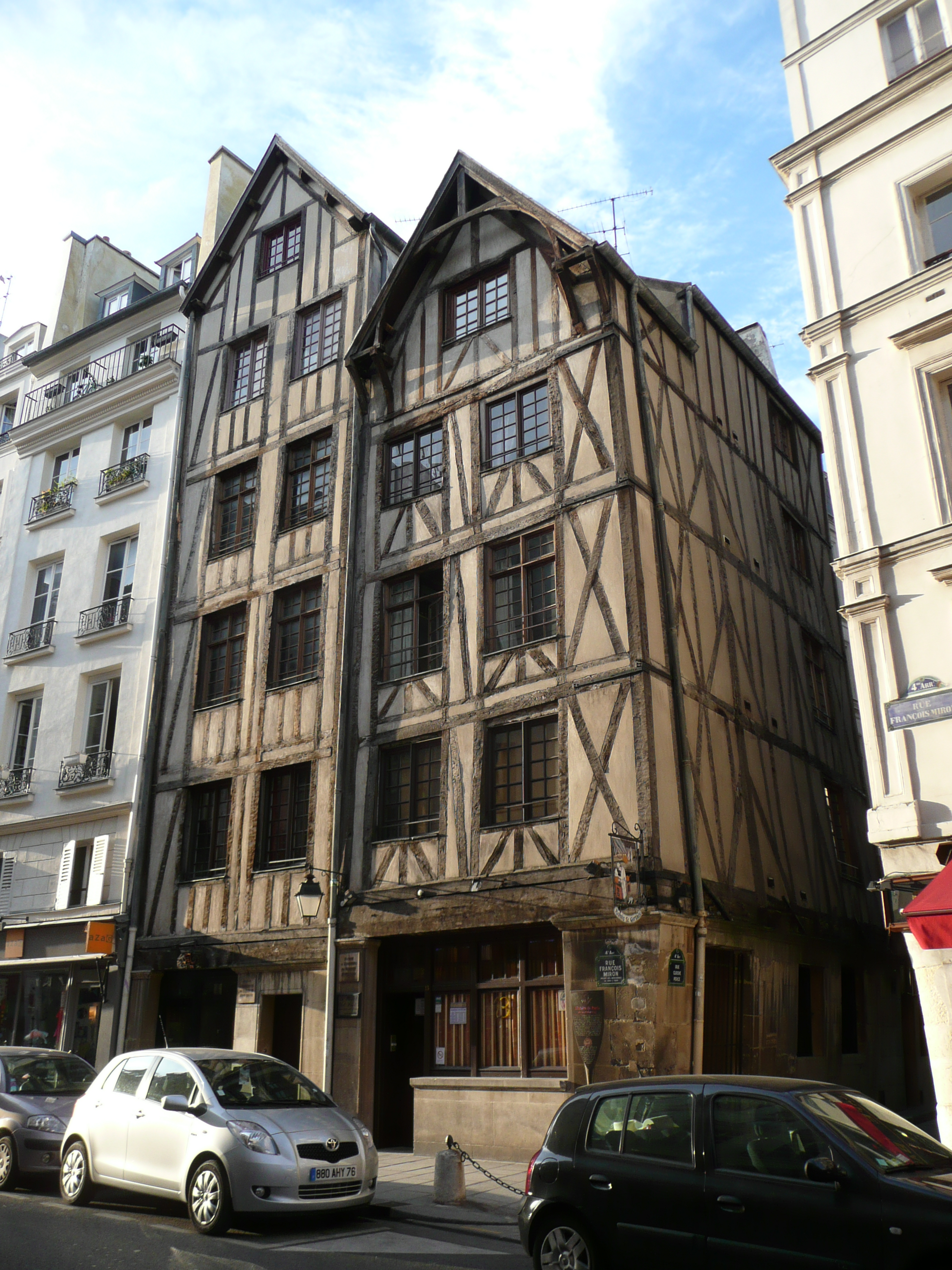
Medieval houses in rue Miron

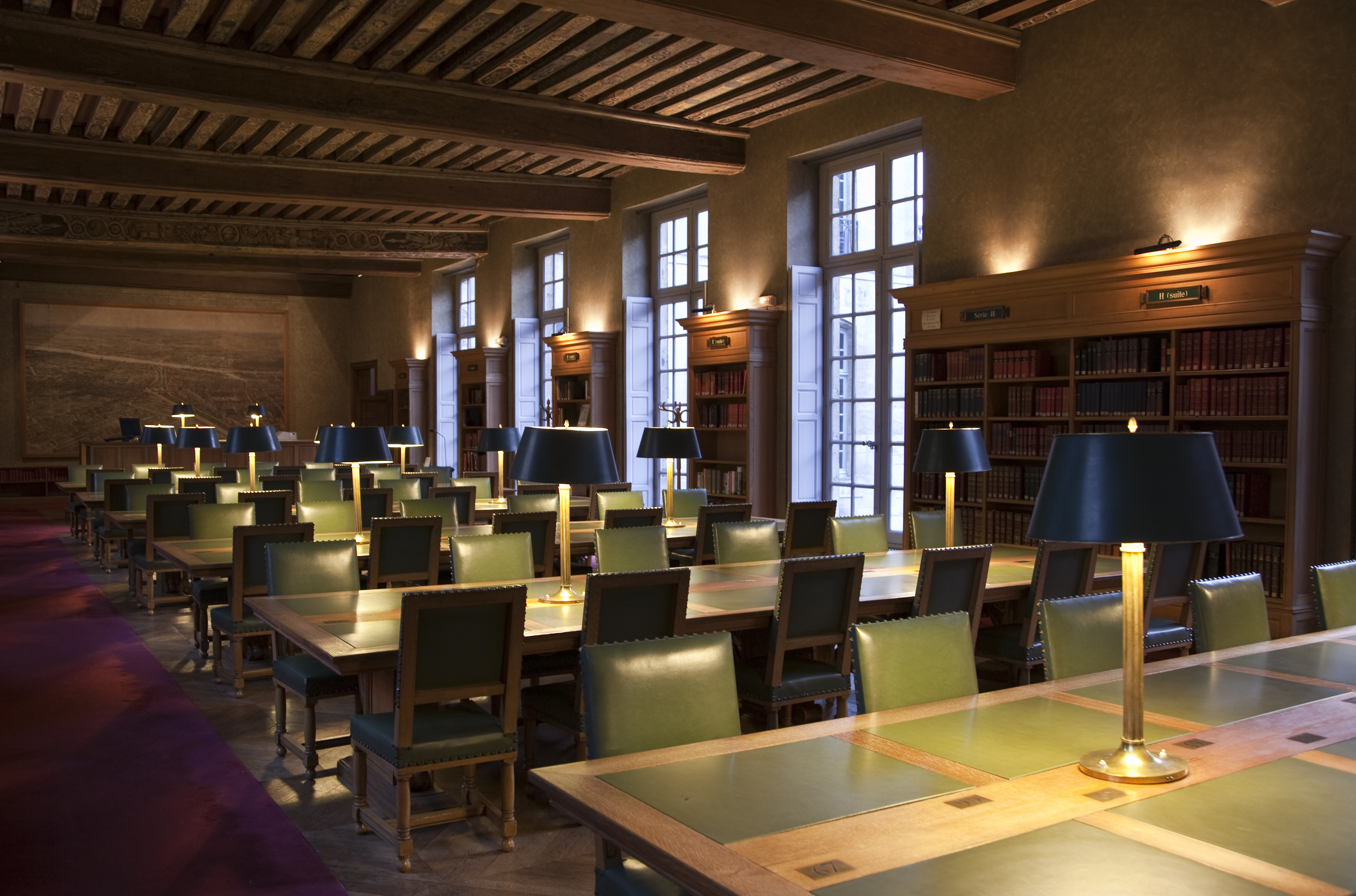
Reading room in the Bibliothèque Historique de la Ville de Paris (City of Paris History Library)

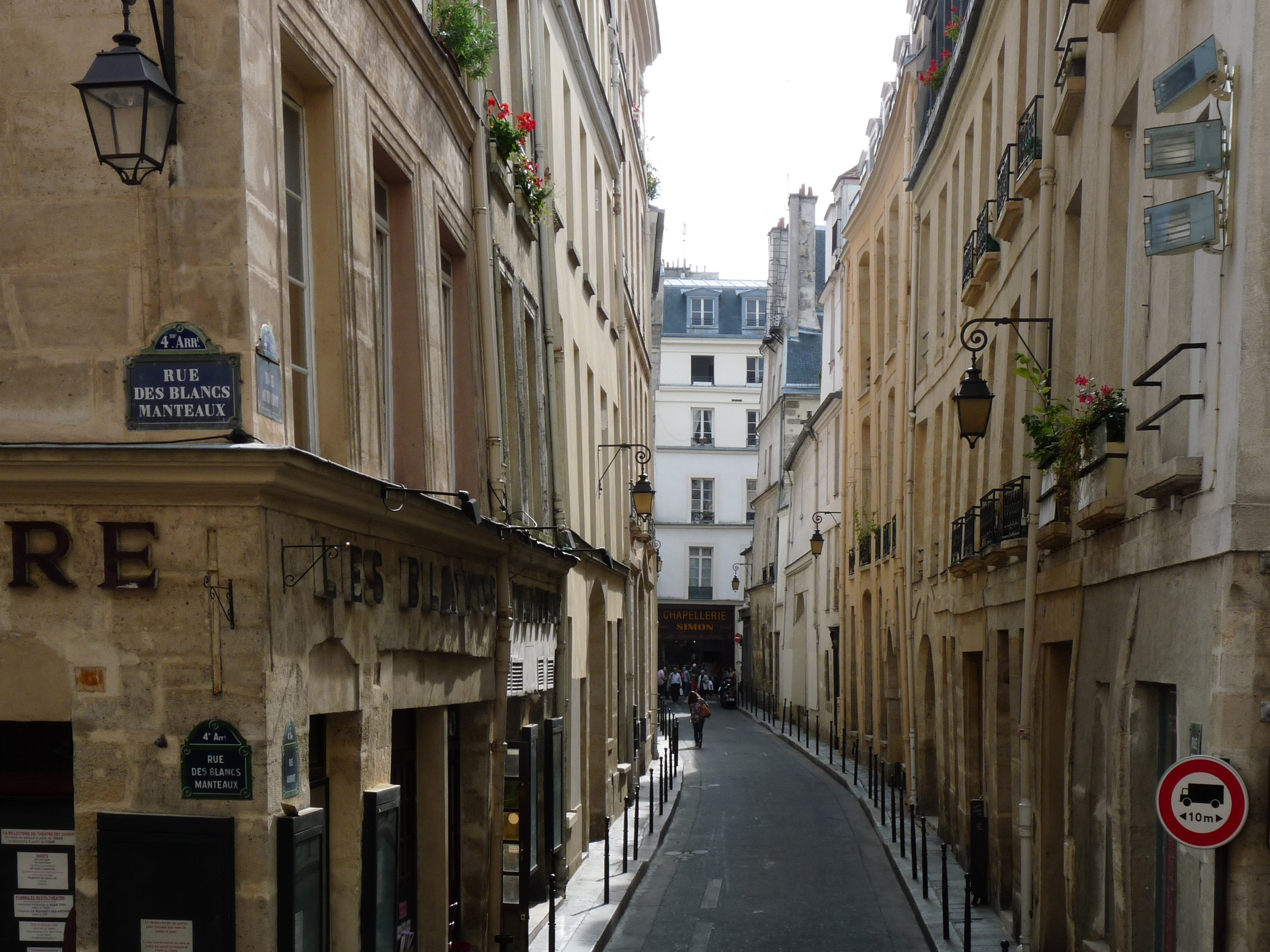
View of rue Aubriot

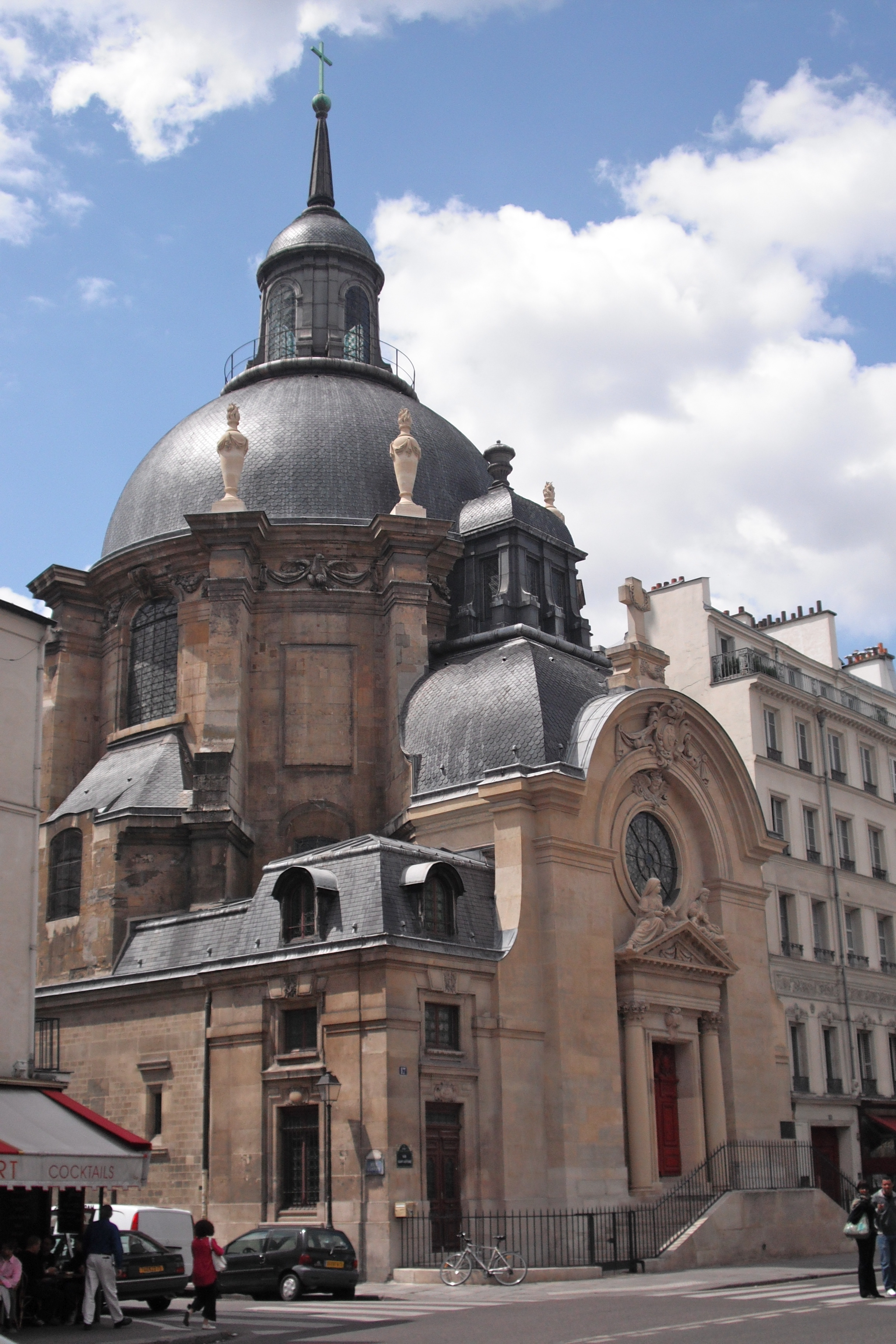
Temple du Marais, a Protestant church

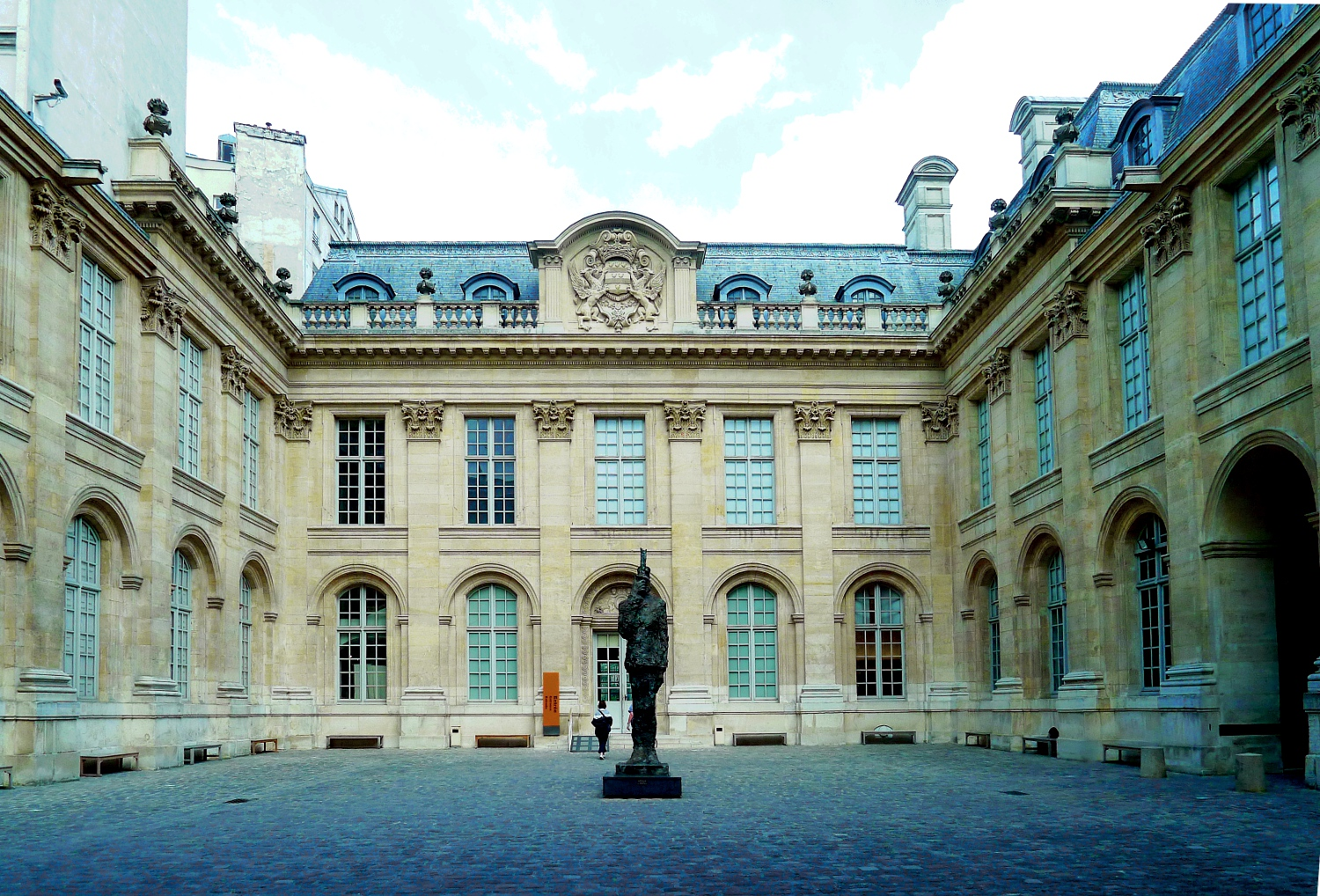
Courtyard of the Hotel de Saint-Aignan, which houses the Musée d'Art et d'Histoire du Judaïsme

== See also ==
- Musée Carnavalet
- Goldenberg restaurant attack
- History of the Jews in France
- LGBT culture in Paris
- Musée d'Art et d'Histoire du Judaïsme
- Musée Picasso
- Rue Beautreillis
- Rue des Rosiers
