= Asia Now =

Art fair in Paris, France

Asia Now is an art fair that takes place during Paris Art Week in October that highlights artists from Asia and its diaspora, with Asia broadly defined. It has featured arts and works from Central Asia, South Asia, South East Asia, East Asia and West Asia. It was officially launched in 2015 by Alexandra Fain, who also directs the fair, and is held in the Monnaie de Paris.

Asia Now combines commercial exhibitions with public programming, including installations, performances, panels, and artist workshops. The first rendition of the event even included a pop-up Cantonese restaurant. With its goal of introducing Asian art to European collectors, the fair works with well-known artists and often features many returning galleries, but also includes emerging artists and focuses on bringing in artists who have never exhibited in Paris. Each year, a theme or a country of focus is chosen that unites the exhibitions.

== Location ==
It was held for seven years in a private mansion in the 8th arrondissement of Paris called Les Salons Hoche, but moved in 2022 to the Monnaie de Paris, where it continues to be held. The move encouraged certain in-situ installations highlighting and drawing from the historic location, a practice that has continued with two site specific installations commissioned for the 2024 edition as well.

== History ==
In 2010, Fain fell in love with Asian art after being introduced to Chinese contemporary art by a friend, and wanted to bring Asia's art scene to Europe, where it was underrepresented and unknown. Together with curator Ami Barak and Fain's father Claude, the first edition of the fair ran in 2015, attracting 18 galleries.

The fair grew significantly over time from 18 galleries at the first edition, to 34 galleries at the second, to 88 galleries at the 8th edition. Originally focused on Chinese contemporary art, it has grown to include 28 different territories at the 2024 edition.

The fair celebrated its tenth anniversary in 2024, cohering around the theme "ceremony." Some of the previous themes or regions of focus have included: India, Japan, 'the art of living on a damaged planet', 'IRL' (In Real Life, focused on emerging artists), among others.
