= Paris Internationale =

Art fair in Paris

- Status: Active
- Genre: Art Fair
- Date: October 21-26, 2025
- Frequency: Annual
- Locations: Paris, France
- Years active: 2015–present
- Website: parisinternationale.com

Paris Internationale is a nomadic contemporary art fair that takes place in October every year during Paris Art week that showcases a range of artists — from established names to emerging talents — in the art world.

The fair is organized by gallerists and takes an invite-only policy for exhibitors, rather than having an open application process. It now runs concurrently with Art Basel Paris, and previously with Foire Internationale d'Art Contemporain (FIAC), before it became defunct.

== Format ==
Along with the buying and selling activity, Paris Internationale also interweaves a cultural program with free spaces and guided tours from knowledgeable art world experts.

It appeals to some gallerists because it has a less corporate feel than the main anchor events of Paris Art Week.

== Locations ==
In addition, the fair does not have an established location, often picking a 19th-century building to set up shop. It has been held in places as diverse as dilapidated townhouses and a newspaper’s old parking lot.

In 2024, it took place at the Central Bergère, a former telephone exchange, in the 9th arrondissement and hosted 75 galleries from 19 countries.

As with the roving Basel Social Club during Art Basel in Switzerland, Paris Internationale’s shifting location means the fair has a different feel every year.

== History ==
The fair launched in 2015. At the time, another art fair named Slick was the main alternative to FIAC, France’s now defunct international contemporary art fair. Slick ended in 2015, and Paris Internationale became the main venue for emerging galleries that were not yet established enough for FIAC. Since Art Basel ousted FIAC in 2022 from its calendar slot at the Grand Palais, Paris Internationale has been concurrent with what is now Art Basel Paris.

Unlike FIAC, Paris Internationale was still held in 2020 despite the COVID-19 pandemic.
