= Hôtel de Guénégaud (rue des Archives) =

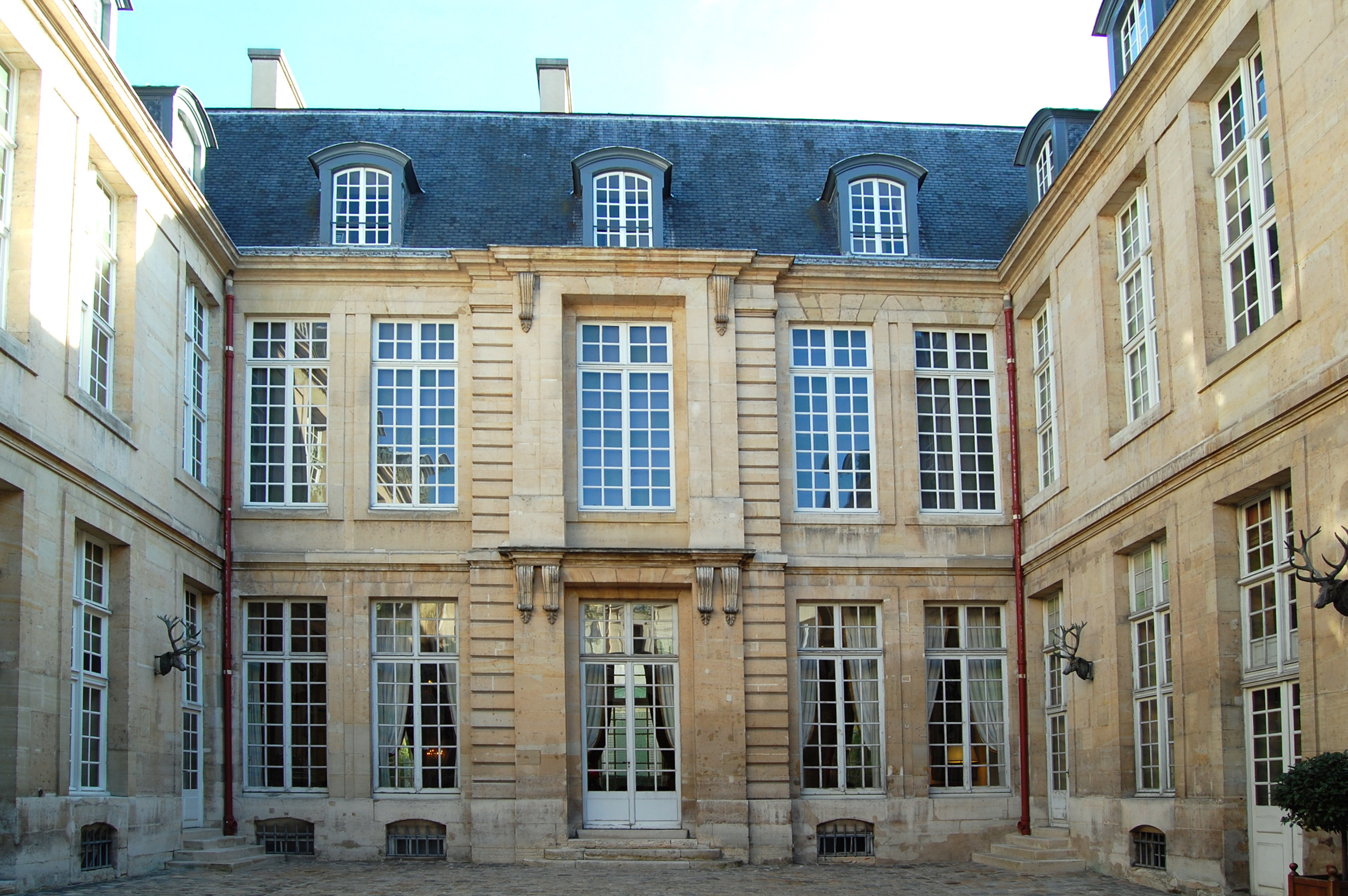
- Hôtel de Guénégaud on the rue des Archives (48°51′41″N 2°21′31″E)
- Interactive map of the Hôtel de Guénégaud area

General information
- Location: Paris, France

Hôtel de Guénégaud or Hôtel de Guénégaud-des-Brosses (French pronunciation: [otɛl də ɡeneɡo de bʁɔs]) is a 17th-century hôtel particulier, or large townhouse, in Paris.

At 60, rue des Archives in the 3rd arrondissement of Paris, the Hôtel de Guénégaud was built between 1651 and 1655 for Jean-François de Guénégaud des Brosses, secrétaire du Roi, maître des Comptes and conseiller d'État, to designs by the architect François Mansart. Along with the Hôtel Carnavalet, it is the best preserved hôtel particulier designed by this architect.

The hôtel was acquired by Jean Romanet in 1703, and, according to his contemporary Germain Brice, Romanet greatly embellished its interiors in the following year. It fell into disrepair and was divided into apartments in the late 19th century, but was acquired by the City of Paris in 1961. An extensive restoration was begun in 1962 under the direction of the architect André Sallez, and since 1967 it has housed the Musée de la Chasse et de la Nature and the offices of the Club de la Chasse et de la Nature.

It is served by the Arts et Métiers and Filles du Calvaire Metro stations.

== Bibliography ==
- Ayers, Andrew (2004). The Architecture of Paris. Stuttgart: Axel Menges. ISBN 9783930698967.
- Braham, Allan; Smith, Peter (1973). François Mansart. London: A. Zwemmer. ISBN 9780302022511.
- Gady, Alexandre, editor; Jean-Pierre Jouve, editor (2006). Les hôtels de Guénégaud et de Mongelas : rendez-vous de chasse des Sommer au Marais. Paris: Citadelles & Mazenod. ISBN 9782850882180.
- Gady, Alexandre (2008). Les Hôtels particuliers de Paris du Moyen Âge à la Belle Époque. Paris: Parigramme. ISBN 9782840962137.
- Leproux, Guy-Michel (1998). "L'hôtel de Guénégaud des Brosses, rue du Grand-Chantier 1651–1653", pp. 205–209, in François Mansart : Le génie de l'architecture, edited by Jean-Pierre Babelon and Claude Mignot. Paris: Gallimard. ISBN 9782070115921.
- Mignot, Claude (1994). "Guénégaud", pp. 224–225, in Le Guide du Patrimoine, Paris, edited by Jean-Marie Pérouse de Montclos. Paris: Hachette. ISBN 9782010168123.
