= Foire Internationale d'Art Contemporain =

Contemporary art fair

The Paris International Contemporary Art Fair (Foire Internationale d’Art Contemporain or FIAC) was a contemporary art event that was held in Paris from 1974 to 2021 and was considered the flagship arts event of France.

The fair effectively ended after a January 2022 announcement that Swiss-organization Art Basel would take over the calendar slot occupied by FIAC and that the long-time head of FIAC would join an Art Basel-advisory committee overseeing the new Paris festival.

== Cultural Significance ==
FIAC had been considered a French fair that local arts community took national pride in, including the French government. Starting in 2018, President Emmanuel Macron held receptions at the Élysée Palace for organizers, museum curators. At one such reception in 2021, he thanked FIAC’s long-time director, Jennifer Flay, for transforming the fair into the “nerve center of the art world.”

== History ==
FIAC was started by gallery owner Daniel Gervis together with artist Bengt Olson and was usually held in October in the Grand Palais.

From 2006 to 2019, as part of the fair’s outdoor program Hors les Murs, well-known venues across the city – the Tuileries Garden, the Musée national Eugène Delacroix, the National Museum of Natural History and Place Vendôme – featured temporary installations of Alexander Calder, George Condo, Thomas Houseago, Robert Indiana, Per Kirkeby, Alicja Kwade, Richard Long and Oscar Tuazon, among others. From 2018, the venues also included Place de la Concorde, with architectural works by Kengo Kuma, Claude Parent and Jean Prouvé, among others.

Following Brexit and the departure of Great Britain from the European Union, the Paris arts scene particular experienced a boost in stature as many international galleries chose to open locations in Paris to keep a foothold in Europe.

In 2019, the fair announced that it would move to a temporary venue on the Champ de Mars, by the Eiffel Tower, for at least two years while the Grand Palais was slated for renovations for the 2024 Paris Olympics. It was scheduled to move back to the Grand Palais for the 2024 fair. In January 2022, however, the management of the Grand Palais made a surprise announcement that it had given the October calendar slot to Art Basel starting in October 2022.

== Demise ==
While the art fairs of London Frieze, Art Basel in Switzerland and Art Basel Miami Beach attracted wealthy American buyers, there was a sense that FIAC was not keeping pace, in part because while the fair felt more French, that also felt more provincial. At least some international gallerists stated that FIAC tended to underperform in sales relative to other events.

Nonetheless, the announcement that the native-run FIAC being displaced by a Swiss-managed art fair was met with shock and ambivalence by the Paris-based art community as it meant the demise of a cornerstone of Paris art scene. Philippe Boutté, a gallery director, called it “sad and violent.”

The organizers of FIAC, RX Group, released a statement after the Art Basel announcement that it "strongly regrets this decision taken abruptly by the public institution, at the end of a procedure which RX believes was hasty and flawed.” Michel Filzi, the president of RX France, said in the statement, “This is a huge disappointment for our teams and all the clients and partners who support us."

== Chronology ==
- 1974 – The first edition is held in the Gare de la Bastille
- 1975 – The fair moves to the Grand Palais
- 1982 – FIAC welcomes photography for the first time
- 2001 – The fair welcomes video art for the first time
- 2007 – FIAC and Artprice issue the first Annual Report on the Contemporary Art Market, analyzing the sales of 500 artists
- 2011 – FIAC starts to have an outside the walls part, in the Jardin des Plantes and the Jardin des Tuileries
- 2014 – In parallel of FIAC, the first Foire OFF(ICIELLE) is launched with 68 emerging galleries at the City of Fashion and Design
- 2021 – Due to renovations, FAIC moves to a temporary tent managed by the Grand Palais near the Eiffel Tower called the Grand Palais Éphémère.
- 2022 – Grand Palais announces that the calendar slot historically held by FIAC would be taken over by Art Basel.

=== Directors ===
- 2003–2021: Jennifer Flay

== Marcel Duchamp Prize ==
The Marcel Duchamp Prize (in French : Prix Marcel Duchamp) is an annual award given to a young artist by the Association pour la Diffusion Internationale de l'Art Français (ADIAF) since 2001 at the FIAC.

The winner receives €35,000 personally and up to €30,000 in order to produce an exhibition of their work in the Modern Art museum (Centre Georges Pompidou).

== Controversy ==
In 2014, a Hors Les Murs feature, the 80-meter-high inflatable sculpture Tree by Paul McCarthy in the Place Vendôme was deflated by vandals. McCarthy and local authorities decided not to re-inflate it. The lime green sculpture was described by the artist as a Christmas tree, but critics said it looked like a butt plug.

== See also ==
- Art Basel
- Frieze Art Fair
