= List of Paris councillors =

This page presents the current and previous members of the Council of Paris, who are elected for a six-year term.

== 2026–2032 councillors ==
These are the councillors elected in the 2026 Paris municipal election.

Name	Group	Party or nuance	Other positions
Emmanuel Grégoire	GSDG	Socialist Party	Mayor of Paris, councillor of Grand Paris
Lamia El Aaraje	GSDG	Socialist Party	First deputy mayor of Paris, councillor of Grand Paris
David Belliard	ESP	The Greens	Mayor of 11th arrondissement of Paris, councillor of Grand Paris
Anne-Claire Boux	ESP	The Greens	Deputy mayor of Paris, councillor of Grand Paris
Ian Brossat	GCP	Communist Party	Senator of Paris (from 2023), councillor of Grand Paris, co-president of Communist Group
Marine Rosset	GSDG	Socialist Party	Deputy mayor of Paris, councillor of Grand Paris
Éric Pliez	GSDG	Place publique	Mayor of 20th arrondissement of Paris, councillor of Grand Paris
Fatoumata Koné	ESP	The Ecologists	Deputy mayor of Paris, councillor of Grand Paris
Jérôme Coumet	GSDG	Miscellaneous Left	Mayor of 13th arrondissement of Paris, councillor of Grand Paris, co-president of Socialists Group
Lucie Castets	ESP	Miscellaneous Left	Mayor of 12^{e} arrondissement of Paris, councillor of Grand Paris
Antoine Alibert	ESP	The Ecologists	Deputy mayor of Paris, councillor of Grand Paris
Raphaëlle Primet	GCP	Communist Party	Councillor of Grand Paris, co-president of Communist group
François Dagnaud	GSDG	Socialist Party	Mayor of 19th arrondissement of Paris, councillor of Grand Paris
Théa Fourdrinier	NI	Place publique	Councillor of Grand Paris
Éric Lejoindre	GSDG	Socialist Party	Mayor of 18^{e} arrondissement of Paris, councillor of Grand Paris
Aminata Niakaté	ESP	The Ecologists	Deputy mayor of Paris, councillor of Grand Paris
Dan Lert	ESP	The Ecologists	Deputy mayor of Paris, councillor of Grand Paris
Alexandra Cordebard	GSDG	Socialist Party	Mayor of 10th arrondissement of Paris, councillor of Grand Paris
Adrien Tiberti	GCP	Communist Party	Councillor of Grand Paris
Isabelle Rocca	GSDG	Socialist Party	Councillor of Grand Paris
François Vauglin	GSDG	Socialist Party	Deputy mayor of Paris, councillor of Grand Paris
Johanne Kouassi	GSDG	Socialist Party	Deputy mayor of Paris, councillor of Grand Paris
Maxime Crosnier	ESP	The Ecologists	Deputy mayor of Paris, councillor of Grand Paris
Halima Jemni	GSDG	Socialist Party	Councillor of Grand Paris
Guillaume Durand	ESP	The Ecologists	Councillor of Grand Paris, co-president of Ecologist and Social group
Laurence Patrice	GCP	Communist Party	Deputy mayor of Paris, councillor of Grand Paris
Ariel Weil	GSDG	Socialist Party	Mayor of Paris Centre, councillor of Grand Paris
Mélody Tonolli	ESP	The Ecologists	Deputy mayor of Paris, councillor of Grand Paris
Paul Simondon	GSDG	Socialist Party	Councillor of Grand Paris, councillor of Grand Paris
Emma Rafowicz	GSDG	Socialist Party	Eurodéputée, councillor of Grand Paris
Laurent Sorel	ESP	L'Après	Deputy mayor of Paris, councillor of Grand Paris
Audrey Pulvar	GSDG	Miscellaneous left	Deputy mayor of Paris, councillor of Grand Paris
Karim Ziady	GSDG	Socialist Party	Deputy mayor of Paris, councillor of Grand Paris
Amina Bouri	ESP	The Ecologists	Deputy mayor of Paris, councillor of Grand Paris
Maxime Sauvage	GSDG	Socialist Party	Deputy mayor of Paris, councillor of Grand Paris
Anouch Toranian	GSDG	Socialist Party	Deputy mayor of Paris, councillor of Grand Paris
Pierre Benassaya	ESP	The Ecologists	
Agnès Bertrand	GSDG	Socialist Party	Deputy mayor of Paris
Maxime des Gayets	GSDG	Socialist Party	Deputy mayor of Paris
Alice Timsit	ESP	The Ecologists	Deputy mayor of Paris
Saïd Benmouffok	GSDG	Place publique	
Carine Rolland	GSDG	Socialist Party	Deputy mayor of Paris
Jean-Noël Aqua	GCP	Communist Party	
Céline Hervieu	GSDG	Socialist Party	Deputy for Paris's 11th constituency in the National Assembly (since 2024), co-president of the socialist group in the Council of Paris
Richard Bouigue	GSDG	Socialist Party	Deputy mayor of Paris
Carine Petit	ESP	The Ecologists	Mayor of 14th arrondissement of Paris, councillor of Grand Paris
Thomas Chevandier	GSDG	Socialist Party	Deputy mayor of Paris
Annah Bikouloulou	ESP	The Ecologists	Deputy mayor of Paris
Nicolas Rouveau	ESP	The Ecologists	
Manon Havet	ESP	The Ecologists	
Antoine Guillou	GSDG	Socialist Party	Deputy mayor of Paris
Marion Waller	GSDG	Socialist Party	
Alexandre Menucci	GSDG	Socialist Party	
Juliette Sabatier	GSDG	Socialist Party	
Bechir Saket Bouderbala	ESP	The Ecologists	
Barbara Gomes	GCP	Communist Party	Deputy mayor of Paris
Florian Sitbon	GSDG	Socialist Party	Deputy mayor of Paris
Marie-Pierre Marchand	ESP	The Ecologists	Co-president of Ecologist and Social group
Mams Yaffa	ESP	The Ecologists	Deputy mayor of Paris
Carine Ekon	GSDG	Socialist Party	
Jacques Baudrier	GCP	Communist Party	Deputy mayor of Paris
Alexandra Jardin	GSDG	Socialist Party	
Sylvain Raifaud	ESP	The Ecologists	
Azadeh Akrami-Castanon	ESP	The Ecologists	Deputy mayor of Paris
Kévin Havet	GSDG	Socialist Party	
Rania Kissi	ESP	The Ecologists	
Arnaud Lehoux	ESP	The Ecologists	
Yasmina Merzi	GSDG	Socialist Party	Deputy mayor of Paris
Valentin Guénanen	GSDG	Socialist Party	
Camille Naget	GCP	Communist Party	
Antoine Dupont	ESP	The Ecologists	
Lila Bouadma	NI	Place publique	
Gaston Laval	GSDG	Socialist Party	
Marion-Émi Alix	ESP	The Ecologists	
Mathieu Delmestre	GSDG	Socialist Party	
Gabrielle Siry-Houari	GSDG	Socialist Party	
Nicolas Bonnet Oulaldj	GCP	Communist Party	Deputy mayor of Paris
Ophélie Madinier	ESP	The Ecologists	
Adji Ahoudian	GSDG	Socialist Party	Deputy mayor of Paris
Dominique Kielemoës	GSDG	Socialist Party	
Nour Durand-Raucher	ESP	The Ecologists	
Elisa Yavchitz	GSDG	Socialist Party	
Pierre Rabadan	GSDG	Miscellaneous left	Deputy mayor of Paris
Hélène Bidard	GCP	Communist Party	
Tom Rouffio	ESP	The Ecologists	
Camille Vizioz-Brami	GSDG	Socialist Party	
Ladji Sakho	GCP	Communist Party	
Frédérique Dutreuil	ESP	The Ecologists	
Luc Lebon	GSDG	Socialist Party	
Kadiatou Coulibaly	GSDG	Socialist Party	
Simon Duquerroir	ESP	L'Après	
Rym Karaoun Gouezou	GCP	Communist Party	
Sylvain Maschino	ESP	The Ecologists	
Geneviève Garrigos	GSDG	Socialist Party	
Daniel Tran	GSDG	Socialist Party	
Jeanne Ouvret	ESP	The Ecologists	
Pierre Lombard	GSDG	Place publique	Deputy mayor of Paris
Karine Barbagli	GSDG	Socialist Party	
Charles Mergey	GSDG	Socialist Party	
Laëtitia Vipard	ESP	The Ecologists	
Irénée Frerot	ESP	The Ecologists	
Gwenaëlle Austin	GCP	Communist Party	
Yvain Bourgeat-Lami	GSDG	Socialist Party	
Rachida Dati	PL	Les Républicains	Mayor of 7th arrondissement of Paris, councillor of Grand Paris, co-president of group Paris Liberté
Sylvain Maillard	PL	Renaissance	Deputy for Paris's 1st constituency in the National Assembly (since 2017), councillor of Grand Paris
Maud Gatel	PAC	Democratic Movement	Councillor of Grand Paris, president of Paris au centre group
Eric Schahl	PL	Union of Democrats and Independents	Regional councillor d'Île-de-France, councillor of Grand Paris
Agnès Evren	PL	Les Républicains	Senator for Paris (since 2023), councillor of Grand Paris
Geoffroy Boulard	PL	Les Républicains	Mayor of 17th arrondissement of Paris, councillor of Grand Paris
Emmanuelle Hoffman	PA	Renaissance	Councillor of Grand Paris
Benjamin Haddad	PL	Renaissance	Minister delegate for European Affairs (since 2025), councillor of Grand Paris
Delphine Bürkli	PAC	Horizons	Mayor of 9^{e} arrondissement of Paris, regional councillor d'Île-de-France, councillor of Grand Paris
Jean-Pierre Lecoq	PL	Les Républicains	Mayor of 6th arrondissement of Paris, regional councillor d'Île-de-France, councillor of Grand Paris
Nelly Garnier	PL	Les Républicains	Regional councillor d'Île-de-France, councillor of Grand Paris
Philippe Goujon	PL	Les Républicains	Mayor of 15^{e} arrondissement of Paris, councillor of Grand Paris
Florence Berthout	PA	Horizons	Mayor of 5^{e} arrondissement of Paris, councillor of Grand Paris, co-president of group Paris apaisé
Jérémy Redler	PL	Les Républicains	Mayor of 16^{e} arrondissement of Paris,regional councillor d'Île-de-France, councillor of Grand Paris
Valérie Montandon	PL	Les Républicains	Regional councillor d'Île-de-France, councillor of Grand Paris
Daniel-Georges Courtois	PA	Horizons	Councillor of Grand Paris
Catherine Dumas	PL	Les Républicains	Senator for Paris (2007–2011, and from 2017), councillor of Grand Paris
Pierre Baty	PAC	Democratic Movement	Regional councillor d'Île-de-France, councillor of Grand Paris
Emmanuelle Dauvergne	PL	Les Républicains	Regional councillor d'Île-de-France
Grégory Canal	PL	Les Républicains	co-president of group Paris Liberté
Marlène Schiappa	PA	Renaissance	Regional councillor d'Île-de-France
David Alphand	PL	Les Républicains	
Béatrice Lecouturier	PAC	Democratic Movement	Regional councillor d'Île-de-France
François-Marie Didier	PL	Les Républicains	
Julie Boillot	PA	Horizons	
Aurélien Véron	PL	Les Républicains	
Inès de Raguenel	PL	Les Républicains	
Antoine Lesieur	PA	Renaissance	Co-president of group Paris apaisé
Catherine Ibled	PA	Renaissance	Deputy for Paris's 13th constituency (since 2025)
Thierry Guerrier	PL	Miscellaneous Right	
Anne Biraben	PL	Les Républicains	
Jérôme Sterkers	PL	Les Républicains	
Catherine Lécuyer	PL	Les Républicains	Mayor of 8^{e} arrondissement of Paris
Pierre Liscia	PL	Les Républicains - Soyons libres	Regional councillor d'Île-de-France
Séverine de Compreignac	PAC	Democratic Movement	
Jean-Baptiste Olivier	PL	Les Républicains	
Valentine Serino	PL	Les Républicains	
Karl Astie	PL	Les Républicains	
Eléonore Creuze	PL	Union of Democrats and Independents	
Pierre Casanova	PAC	Democratic Movement	
Anne-Claire Tyssandier	PL	Les Républicains	
Antoine Beauquier	PL	Les Républicains	
Clara Chassaniol	PA	Renaissance	
Jules Pasquier	PAC	Democratic Movement	
Alexandra Nicol	PL	Les Républicains	Regional councillor d'Île-de-France
Frédéric Péchenard	PL	Les Républicains	Vice-president of Conseil régional d'Île-de-France
Rachel-Flore Pardo	PA	Renaissance	
Sandro Gozi	PAC	Democratic Movement	
Alexia Germont	PA	Horizons	
Abdoulaye Kanté	PA	Renaissance	
Véronique Baldini	PL	Les Républicains	
Sophia Chikirou	NPP	La France Insoumise	Deputy for Paris's 6th constituency (since 2022), councillor of Grand Paris, co-president of group Nouveau Paris Populaire
Émile Meunier	NPP	Les Verts Populaires	Councillor of Grand Paris, co-president of group Nouveau Paris Populaire
Céline Verzeletti	NPP	La France insoumise	Councillor of Grand Paris
Roland Timsit	NPP	La France insoumise	
Sonia Chaouche	NPP	La France insoumise	
Rodrigo Arenas	NPP	La France insoumise	Deputy for Paris's 10th constituency (since 2022)
Sophie de La Rochefoucauld	NPP	La France insoumise	
Christophe Prudhomme	NPP	La France insoumise	
Sabrina Nouri	NPP	La France insoumise	

== 2020–2026 councillors ==
=== Council summary ===
President of the Council of Paris
Anne Hidalgo (PS)
Party	Abbrv	Seats	Group	Abv.	Président(s)
Majority (96 seats)
Socialist Party	PS	41	Paris en commun	PEC	Rémi Féraud
Miscellaneous Left	DVG	13	Paris en commun	PEC	Rémi Féraud
Europe Ecology – The Greens	EELV	21	Écologiste of Paris	GEP	Fatoumata Koné
Génération.s	G.s	5	Écologiste of Paris	GEP	Fatoumata Koné
Génération écologie	GE	1	Écologiste of Paris	GEP	Fatoumata Koné
Animalist Party	PA	1	Écologiste of Paris	GEP	Fatoumata Koné
French Communist Party	PCF	11	Communiste et citoyen	GCC	Ian Brossat; Raphaëlle Primet
Génération.s	G.s	1	Non-inscrits	NI	-
Divers gauche	DVG	2	Non-inscrits	NI	-
Opposition (67 seats)
The Republicans	LR	29	Changer Paris (Républicains, Centristes et Indépendants)	CP	David Alphand; Rachida Dati
Miscellaneous Right	DVD	4	Changer Paris (Républicains, Centristes et Indépendants)	CP	David Alphand; Rachida Dati
Soyons libres	Libres	2	Changer Paris (Républicains, Centristes et Indépendants)	CP	David Alphand; Rachida Dati
Union of Democrats and Independents	UDI	1	Changer Paris (Républicains, Centristes et Indépendants)	CP	David Alphand; Rachida Dati
Renaissance	RE	1	Changer Paris (Républicains, Centristes et Indépendants)	CP	David Alphand; Rachida Dati
The Republicans	LR	12	Les Républicains, Les Centristes – Demain Paris !	LRC-DP	Francis Szpiner
The Centrists	LC	3	Les Républicains, Les Centristes – Demain Paris !	LRC-DP	Francis Szpiner
Mouvement démocrate	MoDem	5	Modem, Démocrates et Écologistes	MDE	Maud Gatel
Renaissance	RE	2	Modem, Démocrates et Écologistes	MDE	Maud Gatel
Horizons	HOR	1	Modem, Démocrates et Écologistes	MDE	Maud Gatel
Horizons	HOR	3	Pour Paris	PP	Paul Hatte; Catherine Ibled
Renaissance	RE	1	Pour Paris	PP	Paul Hatte; Catherine Ibled
Miscellaneous Right	DVD	1	Pour Paris	PP	Paul Hatte; Catherine Ibled
L'Après	L'A	1	Non-inscrits	NI	-
The Centrists	LC	1	Non-inscrits	NI	-

=== Councillors ===
Sorted by arrondissement, group, then name

Name	Group	Party	Arrondissement	Notes
Ariel Weil	PEC	Socialist Party	Paris Centre	Mayor of Paris Centre, councillor of Grand Paris
~~Pierre Aidenbaum~~	~~PEC~~	~~Socialist Party~~	~~Paris Centre~~	~~Resigned in November 2020~~
Gauthier Caron-Thibault	PEC	Socialist Party	Paris Centre	
Boris Jamet-Fournier	PEC	Socialist Party	Paris Centre	
Véronique Levieux	PEC	Socialist Party	Paris Centre	Deputy mayor of Paris
Audrey Pulvar	PEC	Divers gauche	Paris Centre	Deputy mayor of Paris
Raphaëlle Rémy-Leleu	GEP	The Ecologists	Paris Centre	Councillor of Grand Paris
Corine Faugeron	GEP	The Ecologists	Paris Centre	Replaced Pierre Aidenbaum
Aurélien Véron	CP	The Republicans	Paris Centre	Councillor of Grand Paris
Florence Berthout	PP	Horizons	5th arrondissement	Mayor of 5th arrondissement of Paris, councillor of Grand Paris
Anne Biraben	CP	The Republicans	5th arrondissement	
Pierre Casanova	MDE	Mouvement démocrate	5th arrondissement	
Marie-Christine Lemardeley	PEC	Socialist Party	5th arrondissement	Deputy mayor of Paris
Jean-Pierre Lecoq	CP	The Republicans	6th arrondissement	Mayor of 6th arrondissement of Paris, regional councillor of Île-de-France, councillor of Grand Paris
Séverine de Compreignac	MDE	Mouvement démocrate	6th arrondissement	
Céline Hervieu	PEC	Socialist Party	6th arrondissement	Deputy for Paris's 11th constituency (since 2024)
Rachida Dati	CP	The Republicans	7th arrondissement	Minister of Culture, mayor of 7th arrondissement of Paris, co-president of Changer Paris group in the Council of Paris, councillor of Grand Paris
Jean Laussucq	CP	Renaissance	7th arrondissement	Deputy for Paris's 2nd constituency (2024–2025)
Emmanuelle Dauvergne	CP	The Republicans	7th arrondissement	Regional councillor of Île-de-France
René-François Bernard	CP	Union of Democrats and Independents	7th arrondissement	
Jeanne d'Hauteserre	LRC-DP	The Republicans	8th arrondissement	Mayor of 8th arrondissement of Paris, regional councillor of Île-de-France, councillor of Grand Paris. Resigned from the CP group after Rachida Dati joined the government, and joined the LRC-DP group.
Vincent Baladi	LRC-DP	The Republicans	8th arrondissement	Resigned from the CP group after Rachida Dati joined the government, and joined the LRC-DP group
Delphine Malachard des Reyssiers	LRC-DP	The Republicans	8th arrondissement	Resigned from the CP group after Rachida Dati joined the government, and joined the LRC-DP group
Delphine Bürkli	MDE	Horizons	9th arrondissement	Mayor of 9th arrondissement of Paris, regional councillor of Île-de-France, councillor of Grand Paris
Alexis Govciyan	MDE	La République en marche	9th arrondissement	
Maud Lelièvre	MDE	Mouvement démocrate	9th arrondissement	
Arnaud Ngatcha	PEC	Divers gauche	9th arrondissement	Deputy mayor of Paris
Alexandra Cordebard	PEC	Socialist Party	10th arrondissement	Mayor of 10th arrondissement of Paris, councillor of Grand Paris
Paul Simondon	PEC	Socialist Party	10th arrondissement	Deputy mayor of Paris
Dominique Versini	PEC	Divers centre	10th arrondissement	Deputy mayor of Paris
Rémi Féraud	PEC	Socialist Party	10th arrondissement	Senator of Paris, president of Paris en Commun group in Council of Paris
Sylvain Raifaud	GEP	The Ecologists	10th arrondissement	Councillor of Grand Paris
Léa Vasa	GEP	The Ecologists	10th arrondissement	
Laurence Patrice	GCC	French Communist Party	10th arrondissement	Deputy mayor of Paris
François Vauglin	PEC	Socialist Party	11th arrondissement	Mayor of 11th arrondissement of Paris, councillor of Grand Paris
Anne Hidalgo (Mayor of Paris)	PEC	Socialist Party	11th arrondissement	Mayor of Paris, first vice-president of Grand Paris
Patrick Bloche	PEC	Socialist Party	11th arrondissement	Premier deputy mayor of Paris (since 2024)
Delphine Terlizzi	PEC	Divers écologiste	11th arrondissement	
Dominique Kielemoës	PEC	Socialist Party	11th arrondissement	
Jean-François Martins	PEC	Divers centre	11th arrondissement	
Nour Durand-Raucher	GEP	The Ecologists	11th arrondissement	
David Belliard	GEP	The Ecologists	11th arrondissement	Deputy mayor of Paris, councillor of Grand Paris
Chloé Sagaspe	GEP	The Ecologists	11th arrondissement	
Hélène Bidard	GCC	French Communist Party	11th arrondissement	Deputy mayor of Paris, councillor of Grand Paris
Nelly Garnier	CP	The Republicans	11th arrondissement	
Emmanuelle Pierre-Marie	GEP	The Ecologists	12th arrondissement	Mayor of 12th arrondissement of Paris
Alice Coffin	GEP	The Ecologists	12th arrondissement	
Emmanuel Grégoire	PEC	Socialist Party	12th arrondissement	Deputy for Paris's 7th constituency (since 2024), councillor of Grand Paris. First deputy mayor of Paris (until 2024).
Pénélope Komitès	PEC	Socialist Party	12th arrondissement	Deputy mayor of Paris, councillor of Grand Paris
~~Jacques Martial~~	~~PEC~~	~~Socialist Party~~	~~12th arrondissement~~	Deputy mayor of Paris, died in August 2025
Jean-Luc Romero-Michel	PEC	Divers centre	12th arrondissement	Deputy mayor of Paris, regional councillor of Île-de-France
Nicolas Bonnet-Oulaldj	GCC	French Communist Party	12th arrondissement	Deputy mayor of Paris, councillor of Grand Paris
Sandrine Charnoz	GEP	Génération.s	12th arrondissement	Deputy mayor of Paris
Richard Bouigue	PEC	Socialist Party	12th arrondissement	Replaced Jacques Martial
Valérie Montandon	CP	The Republicans	12th arrondissement	Regional councillor of Île-de-France, councillor of Grand Paris
Franck Margain	CP	Miscellaneous right	12th arrondissement	Regional councillor of Île-de-France
Jérôme Coumet	PEC	Divers gauche	13th arrondissement	Mayor of 13th arrondissement of Paris, councillor of Grand Paris
Christophe Najdovski	PEC	Divers écologiste	13th arrondissement	Deputy mayor of Paris, councillor of Grand Paris
Emmanuel Coblence	PEC	Socialist Party	13th arrondissement	
Antoine Guillou	PEC	Socialist Party	13th arrondissement	Deputy mayor of Paris
Johanne Kouassi	PEC	Socialist Party	13th arrondissement	Councillor of Grand Paris
Nathalie Laville	PEC	Divers écologiste	13th arrondissement	
Marie-José Raymond-Rossi	PEC	Socialist Party	13th arrondissement	
Anne Souyris	GEP	The Ecologists	13th arrondissement	Senator for Paris (since 2023), councillor of Grand Paris
Alexandre Florentin	GEP	Génération écologie	13th arrondissement	
Béatrice Patrie	GCC	Divers gauche	13th arrondissement	
Jean-Noël Aqua	GCC	French Communist Party	13th arrondissement	Councillor of Grand Paris
Jean-Baptiste Olivier	CP	The Republicans	13th arrondissement	
Elisabeth Stibbe	LRC-DP	Les Centristes	13th arrondissement	Resigned from the CP group after Rachida Dati joined the government, and joined the LRC-DP group
Carine Petit	GEP	Génération.s	14th arrondissement	Mayor of 14th arrondissement of Paris, councillor of Grand Paris
Célia Blauel	PEC	Divers écologiste	14th arrondissement	Deputy mayor of Paris
Olivia Polski	PEC	Socialist Party	14th arrondissement	Deputy mayor of Paris
Maxime Cochard	NI	Sans étiquette	14th arrondissement	Left the Communists of Paris group in 2021 following allegations against him by the justice system
Pierre Rabadan	PEC	Divers gauche	14th arrondissement	Deputy mayor of Paris, councillor of Grand Paris
Hermano Sanches Ruivo	PEC	Divers gauche	14th arrondissement	
~~Geneviève Lardy-Woringer~~	~~GEP~~	~~The Ecologists~~	~~14th arrondissement~~	~~Démission en mai 2021~~
Florentin Letissier	GEP	The Ecologists	14th arrondissement	Deputy mayor of Paris
Mélody Tonolli	GEP	Génération.s	14th arrondissement	Deputy mayor of Paris, replaced Geneviève Lardy-Woringer
Marie-Claire Carrère-Gée	CP	The Republicans	14th arrondissement	Senator for Paris (since 2023), councillor of Grand Paris
Patrick Viry	CP	The Republicans	14th arrondissement	
Philippe Goujon	CP	The Republicans	15th arrondissement	Mayor of 15th arrondissement of Paris, councillor of Grand Paris
Agnès Evren	CP	The Republicans	15th arrondissement	Senator for Paris (since 2023), councillor of Grand Paris. Députée européenne (jusqu’en 2023).
Grégory Canal	CP	The Republicans	15th arrondissement	
François Connault	LRC-DP	The Republicans	15th arrondissement	Resigned from the CP group after Rachida Dati joined the government, and joined the LRC-DP group
Daniel-Georges Courtois	PP	Horizons	15th arrondissement	Councillor of Grand Paris. Previously a member of CP group (until July 2024).
Claire de Clermont-Tonnerre	CP	The Republicans	15th arrondissement	
Inès de Raguenel	CP	The Republicans	15th arrondissement	
Marie-Caroline Douceré	CP	Miscellaneous right	15th arrondissement	Councillor of Grand Paris
Nicolas Jeanneté	NI	Les Centristes	15th arrondissement	Excluded from the 'Changer Paris' group on 28 March 2023, following allegations against him by the justice system
Anessa Lahouassa	LRC-DP	The Republicans	15th arrondissement	Resigned from the CP group after Rachida Dati joined the government, and joined the LRC-DP group
Franck Lefèvre	CP	The Republicans	15th arrondissement	
Jérôme Loriau	CP	The Republicans	15th arrondissement	
Anne-Claire Tyssandier	CP	Soyons libres	15th arrondissement	
Maud Gatel	MDE	Mouvement démocrate	15th arrondissement	President du groupe MoDem, Démocrates et Écologistes au Conseil of Paris, députée de la onzième circonscription of Paris (2021–2024)
Florian Sitbon	PEC	Socialist Party	15th arrondissement	
Anouch Toranian	PEC	Socialist Party	15th arrondissement	Deputy mayor of Paris, councillor of Grand Paris
Aminata Niakaté	GEP	The Ecologists	15th arrondissement	
Catherine Ibled	PP	Renaissance	15th arrondissement	Co-president of groupe Pour Paris au Conseil of Paris
Francis Szpiner	LRC-DP	The Republicans	16th arrondissement	Sénateur of Paris (since 2023), councillor of Grand Paris. Démissionne du groupe CP après l'entrée au gouvernement de Rachida Dati, et crée le groupe LRC-DP. Mayor of 16th arrondissement (until 2023).
Jérémy Redler	LRC-DP	The Republicans	16th arrondissement	Mayor of 16th arrondissement of Paris (since 2023), regional councillor of d'Île-de-France. Resigned from the CP group after Rachida Dati joined the government, and joined the LRC-DP group.
David Alphand	CP	The Republicans	16th arrondissement	Co-president of group Changer Paris au Conseil of Paris
Samia Badat-Karam	CP	The Republicans	16th arrondissement	
Véronique Baldini	CP	The Republicans	16th arrondissement	
Antoine Beauquier	CP	The Republicans	16th arrondissement	
Sandrine Boëlle	LRC-DP	The Republicans	16th arrondissement	Resigned from the CP group after Rachida Dati joined the government, and joined the LRC-DP group. Députée of Paris (2020–2024).
Véronique Bucaille	LRC-DP	Les Centristes	16th arrondissement	Councillor of Grand Paris. Resigned from the CP group after Rachida Dati joined the government, and joined the LRC-DP group.
Stéphane Capliez	LRC-DP	The Republicans	16th arrondissement	Resigned from the CP group after Rachida Dati joined the government, and joined the LRC-DP group
Emmanuel Messas	LRC-DP	The Republicans	16th arrondissement	Councillor of Grand Paris. Resigned from the CP group after Rachida Dati joined the government, and joined the LRC-DP group.
Aurélie Pirillo	CP	The Republicans	16th arrondissement	
Béatrice Lecouturier	MDE	Mouvement démocrate	16th arrondissement	Regional councillor of Île-de-France
Hannah Sebbah	MDE	Horizons	16th arrondissement	
Geoffroy Boulard	CP	The Republicans	17th arrondissement	Mayor of 17th arrondissement of Paris, 13^{e} vice-president de la Métropole du Grand Paris
Jean-Didier Berthault	CP	Agir	17th arrondissement	
Jack-Yves Bohbot	LRC-DP	The Republicans	17th arrondissement	Resigned from the CP group after Rachida Dati joined the government, and joined the LRC-DP group
Alix Bougeret	CP	The Republicans	17th arrondissement	
Catherine Dumas	CP	The Republicans	17th arrondissement	Senator for Paris
Paul Hatte	PP	Miscellaneous right	17th arrondissement	Co-president of group Pour Paris au Conseil of Paris. Ancien membre du groupe CP (until July 2024).
Hélène Jacquemont	CP	Soyons libres	17th arrondissement	
Brigitte Kuster	CP	The Republicans	17th arrondissement	
Carline Lubin-Noël	LRC-DP	Les Centristes	17th arrondissement	Resigned from the CP group after Rachida Dati joined the government, and joined the LRC-DP group
Frédéric Péchenard	CP	The Republicans	17th arrondissement	Vice-president du Conseil régional d'Île-de-France
Karen Taïeb	PEC	Socialist Party	17th arrondissement	Deputy mayor of Paris
Karim Ziady	PEC	Socialist Party	17th arrondissement	
Éric Lejoindre	PEC	Socialist Party	18th arrondissement	Mayor of 18th arrondissement of Paris, councillor of Grand Paris
Christophe Girard	NI	Divers gauche	18th arrondissement	Exclu du groupe Paris en Commun le 28 janvier 2021 à la suite de faits lui étant reprochés par la justice
Afaf Gabelotaud	PEC	Socialist Party	18th arrondissement	Deputy mayor of Paris, councillor of Grand Paris
Maya Akkari	PEC	Socialist Party	18th arrondissement	
Jean-Philippe Daviaud	PEC	Socialist Party	18th arrondissement	
Carine Rolland	PEC	Socialist Party	18th arrondissement	Deputy mayor of Paris
Jacques Galvani	PEC	Socialist Party	18th arrondissement	Deputy mayor of Paris
Anne-Claire Boux	GEP	The Ecologists	18th arrondissement	Deputy mayor of Paris, councillor of Grand Paris
Frédéric Badina-Serpette	GEP	The Ecologists	18th arrondissement	
Douchka Markovic	GEP	Parti animaliste	18th arrondissement	
Émile Meunier	GEP	The Ecologists	18th arrondissement	Councillor of Grand Paris
Ian Brossat	GCC	French Communist Party	18th arrondissement	Sénateur of Paris (since 2023), councillor of Grand Paris, Co-president of group Communiste et citoyen au Conseil of Paris
Barbara Gomes	GCC	French Communist Party	18th arrondissement	
Rudolph Granier	CP	The Republicans	18th arrondissement	
Pierre-Yves Bournazel	PP	Horizons	18th arrondissement	
François Dagnaud	PEC	Socialist Party	19th arrondissement	Mayor of 19th arrondissement of Paris, councillor of Grand Paris
Colombe Brossel	PEC	Socialist Party	19th arrondissement	Senator for Paris (since 2023)
Mahor Chiche	PEC	Socialist Party	19th arrondissement	
Halima Jemni	PEC	Socialist Party	19th arrondissement	Councillor of Grand Paris
~~Roger Madec~~	~~PEC~~	~~Socialist Party~~	~~19th arrondissement~~	~~Councillor of Grand Paris~~. Died in December 2024.
François Bechieau	PEC	Socialist Party	19th arrondissement	Replaced Roger Madec as councillor of Grand Paris
Nicolas Nordman	PEC	Socialist Party	19th arrondissement	Deputy mayor of Paris
Fatoumata Koné	GEP	The Ecologists	19th arrondissement	Councillor of Grand Paris, president du groupe écologiste au Conseil of Paris
Dan Lert	GEP	The Ecologists	19th arrondissement	Deputy mayor of Paris
Alice Timsit	GEP	The Ecologists	19th arrondissement	
Jean-Philippe Gillet	GCC	French Communist Party	19th arrondissement	
Camille Naget	GCC	French Communist Party	19th arrondissement	
Léa Filoche	NI	Génération.s	19th arrondissement	Deputy mayor of Paris
Marie Toubiana	CP	The Republicans	19th arrondissement	
~~Gérard Loureiro~~	~~CP~~	~~Les Républicains~~	~~19th arrondissement~~	Died in May 2022
Farida Kerboua	LRC-DP	The Republicans	19th arrondissement	Replaced Gérard Loureiro. Resigned from the CP group after Rachida Dati joined the government, and joined the LRC-DP group.
Éric Pliez	PEC	Divers gauche	20th arrondissement	Mayor of20th arrondissement of Paris, councillor of Grand Paris
Thomas Chevandier	PEC	Socialist Party	20th arrondissement	Deputy mayor of Paris
Lamia El Aaraje	PEC	Socialist Party	20th arrondissement	Deputy mayor of Paris, councillor of Grand Paris
Geneviève Garrigos	PEC	Socialist Party	20th arrondissement	
Hamidou Samake	PEC	Socialist Party	20th arrondissement	Councillor of Grand Paris
Emmanuelle Rivier	GEP	The Ecologists	20th arrondissement	
Antoinette Guhl	GEP	The Ecologists	20th arrondissement	Senator for Paris (since 2023), 4^{e} vice-president de la Métropole du Grand Paris, councillor of Grand Paris
Jérôme Gleizes	GEP	The Ecologists	20th arrondissement	
Jacques Baudrier	GCC	French Communist Party	20th arrondissement	Deputy mayor of Paris, councillor of Grand Paris
Raphaëlle Primet	GCC	French Communist Party	20th arrondissement	Co-president of groupe Communiste et citoyen au Conseil of Paris
Nathalie Maquoi	GEP	Génération.s	20th arrondissement	President of Génération.s group in Council of Paris (until 31 August 2022)
Frédéric Hocquard	GEP	Génération.s	20th arrondissement	Deputy mayor of Paris
François-Marie Didier	CP	The Republicans	20th arrondissement	Councillor of Grand Paris
~~Danielle Simonnet~~	NI	~~La France insoumise~~	~~20th arrondissement~~	Démissionne le 16 décembre 2022
Laurent Sorel	~~NI~~	L'Après ex-La France insoumise	20th arrondissement	Replaced Danielle Simonnet, député-suppléant

== 2014–2020 councillors ==
This list presents the 163 councillors of Council of Paris elected in the 2014 Paris municipal election.

=== Summary table by arrondissement ===
Councillors by parties and arrondissements
Arrondissement	Seats	Majority					Opposition				Unregistered
Arrondissement	Seats	PS	EELV	PCF	DVG	PRG	UMP	UDI	MoDem	DVD	PG
1st	1	–	–	–	–	–	1	–	–	–	–
2nd	2	1	1	–	–	–	–	–	–	–	–
3rd	3	1	–	–	–	1	1	–	–	–	–
4th	2	2	–	–	–	–	–	–	–	–	–
5th	4	1	–	–	–	–	2	–	–	1	–
6th	3	–	–	–	–	–	2	–	1	–	–
7th	4	–	–	–	–	–	3	1	–	–	–
8th	3	–	–	–	–	–	3	–	–	–	–
9th	4	1	–	–	–	–	3	–	–	–	–
10th	7	4	1	1	–	–	1	–	–	–	–
11th	11	5	2	1	1	–	–	2	–	–	–
12th	10	4	1	2	1	–	1	–	1	–	–
13th	13	6	2	2	1	–	1	1	–	–	–
14th	10	5	1	1	1	–	1	1	–	–	–
15th	18	2	–	–	1	–	12	1	2	–	–
16th	13	1	–	–	–	–	8	2	1	1	–
17th	12	2	–	–	–	–	7	2	–	1	–
18th	15	6	3	2	–	1	1	–	1	1	–
19th	14	7	3	2	–	–	2	–	–	–	–
20th	14	7	2	2	–	–	2	–	–	–	1
TOTAL	163	55	16	13	5	2	51	10	6	4	1
TOTAL	163	Majority (91 seats)					Opposition (71 seats)				Unregistered (1 seat)

=== List ===
Arrondissement	Name	Party
1st	Jean-François Legaret	Union for a Popular Movement
2nd	Jacques Boutault	Europe Ecology – The Greens
2nd	Véronique Levieux	Socialist Party
3rd	Pierre Aidenbaum	Socialist Party
3rd	Laurence Goldgrab	Radical Party of the Left
3rd	Marie-Laure Harel	Union for a Popular Movement
4th	Christophe Girard	Socialist Party
4th	Karen Taieb Attias	Socialist Party
5th	Florence Berthout	Union for a Popular Movement
5th	Dominique Tiberi	Miscellaneous right
5th	Dominique Stoppa-Lyonnet	Union for a Popular Movement
5th	Marie-Christine Lemardeley	Socialist Party
6th	Jean-Pierre Lecoq	Union for a Popular Movement
6th	Marielle de Sarnez	Democratic Movement
6th	Alexandre Vesperini	Union for a Popular Movement
7th	Rachida Dati	Union for a Popular Movement
7th	Yves Pozzo di Borgo	Union of Democrats and Independents
7th	Emmanuelle Dauvergne	Union for a Popular Movement
7th	Thierry Hodent	Union for a Popular Movement
8th	Jeanne d'Hauteserre	Union for a Popular Movement
8th	Pierre Lellouche	Union for a Popular Movement
8th	Catherine Lecuyer	Union for a Popular Movement
9th	Delphine Bürkli	Union for a Popular Movement
9th	Jean-Baptiste de Froment	Union for a Popular Movement
9th	Gypsie Bloch	Union for a Popular Movement
9th	Pauline Véron	Socialist Party
10th	Rémi Féraud	Socialist Party
10th	Alexandra Cordebard	Socialist Party
10th	Didier Le Reste	French Communist Party
10th	Anne Souyris	Europe Ecology – The Greens
10th	Bernard Gaudillère	Socialist Party
10th	Yamina Benguigui	Socialist Party
10th	Déborah Pawlik	Union for a Popular Movement
11th	François Vauglin	Socialist Party
11th	Nawel Oumer	Socialist Party
11th	Patrick Bloche	Socialist Party
11th	Joëlle Morel	Europe Ecology – The Greens
11th	Philippe Ducloux	Socialist Party
11th	Hélène Bidard	French Communist Party
11th	Jean-François Martins	Miscellaneous left
11th	Mercedes Zuniga	Socialist Party
11th	David Belliard	Europe Ecology – The Greens
11th	Christian Saint-Étienne	Union of Democrats and Independents
11th	Leïla Diri	Union of Democrats and Independents
12th	Catherine Baratti-Elbaz	Socialist Party
12th	Jean-Louis Missika	Miscellaneous left
12th	Sandrine Charnoz	Socialist Party
12th	Christophe Najdovski	Europe Ecology – The Greens
12th	Catherine Vieu-Charier	French Communist Party
12th	Emmanuel Grégoire	Socialist Party
12th	Pénélope Komitès	Socialist Party
12th	Nicolas Bonnet-Oulaldj	French Communist Party
12th	Valérie Montandon	Union for a Popular Movement
12th	François Haab	Democratic Movement
13th	Jérôme Coumet	Socialist Party
13th	Anne-Christine Lang	Socialist Party
13th	Jean-Marie Le Guen	Socialist Party
13th	Emmanuelle Becker	French Communist Party
13th	Yves Contassot	Europe Ecology – The Greens
13th	Marie-Pierre de La Gontrie	Socialist Party
13th	Bruno Julliard	Socialist Party
13th	Annick Olivier	Socialist Party
13th	Jean-Noël Aqua	French Communist Party
13th	Marie Atallah	Europe Ecology – The Greens
13th	Buon Tan	Miscellaneous left
13th	Édith Gallois	Union of Democrats and Independents
13th	Patrick Trémège	Union for a Popular Movement
14th	Carine Petit	Socialist Party
14th	Pascal Cherki	Socialist Party
14th	Olivia Polski	Socialist Party
14th	Hervé Begué	French Communist Party
14th	Célia Blauel	Europe Ecology – The Greens
14th	Hermano Sanches Ruivo	Socialist Party
14th	Caroline Mécary	Miscellaneous left
14th	Étienne Mercier	Socialist Party
14th	Nathalie Kosciusko-Morizet	Union for a Popular Movement
14th	Éric Azière	Union of Democrats and Independents
15th	Philippe Goujon	Union for a Popular Movement
15th	Claire de Clermont-Tonnerre	Union for a Popular Movement
15th	Jean-François Lamour	Union for a Popular Movement
15th	Anne Tachene	Union of Democrats and Independents
15th	Yann Wehrling	Democratic Movement
15th	Sylvie Ceyrac	Union for a Popular Movement
15th	Pierre Charon	Union for a Popular Movement
15th	Pascale Bladier	Union for a Popular Movement
15th	Daniel-Georges Courtois	Union for a Popular Movement
15th	Maud Gatel	Democratic Movement
15th	Jean-Baptiste Menguy	Union for a Popular Movement
15th	Agnès Evren	Union for a Popular Movement
15th	François-David Cravenne	Union for a Popular Movement
15th	Anne-Charlotte Buffeteau	Union for a Popular Movement
15th	Franck Lefèvre	Union for a Popular Movement
15th	Anne Hidalgo	Socialist Party
15th	Claude Dargent	Socialist Party
15th	Dominique Versini	Miscellaneous left
16th	Danièle Giazzi	Union for a Popular Movement
16th	Claude Goasguen	Union for a Popular Movement
16th	Pierre Gaboriau	Union for a Popular Movement
16th	Céline Boulay-Esperonnier	Union for a Popular Movement
16th	Éric Hélard	Union of Democrats and Independents
16th	Michèle Assouline	Miscellaneous right
16th	Pierre Auriacombe	Union for a Popular Movement
16th	Béatrice Lecouturier	Democratic Movement
16th	Grégoire Chertok	Union for a Popular Movement
16th	Julie Boillot	Union for a Popular Movement
16th	Stéphane Capliez	Union for a Popular Movement
16th	Ann-Katrin Jego	Union of Democrats and Independents
16th	Thomas Lauret	Socialist Party
17th	Geoffroy Boulard	Union for a Popular Movement
17th	Brigitte Kuster	Union for a Popular Movement
17th	Bernard Debré	Union for a Popular Movement
17th	Catherine Dumas	Union for a Popular Movement
17th	Frédéric Péchenard	Miscellaneous right
17th	Valérie Nahmias	Union of Democrats and Independents
17th	Jean-Didier Berthault	Union for a Popular Movement
17th	Alix Bougeret	Union for a Popular Movement
17th	Jérôme Dubus	Union for a Popular Movement
17th	Olga Johnson	Union of Democrats and Independents
17th	Annick Lepetit	Socialist Party
17th	Patrick Klugman	Socialist Party
18th	Éric Lejoindre	Socialist Party
18th	Myriam El Khomri	Socialist Party
18th	Daniel Vaillant	Socialist Party
18th	Afaf Gabelotaud	Socialist Party
18th	Pascal Julien	Europe Ecology – The Greens
18th	Claudine Bouygues	Socialist Party
18th	Ian Brossat	French Communist Party
18th	Sandrine Mées	Europe Ecology – The Greens
18th	Jean-Bernard Bros	Radical Party of the Left
18th	Danièle Premel	French Communist Party
18th	Didier Guillot	Socialist Party
18th	Galla Bridier	Europe Ecology – The Greens
18th	Pierre-Yves Bournazel	Union for a Popular Movement
18th	Fadila Mehal	Democratic Movement
18th	Christian Honoré	Miscellaneous right
19th	François Dagnaud	Socialist Party
19th	Halima Jemni	Socialist Party
19th	Roger Madec	Socialist Party
19th	Colombe Brossel	Socialist Party
19th	Bernard Jomier	Europe Ecology – The Greens
19th	Léa Filoche	Socialist Party
19th	Sergio Tinti	French Communist Party
19th	Aurélie Solans	Europe Ecology – The Greens
19th	Nicolas Nordman	Socialist Party
19th	Fanny Gaillanne	French Communist Party
19th	Mao Peninou	Socialist Party
19th	Fatoumata Koné	Europe Ecology – The Greens
19th	Jean-Jacques Giannesini	Union for a Popular Movement
19th	Anne-Constance Onghena	Union for a Popular Movement
20th	Frédérique Calandra	Socialist Party
20th	Julien Bargeton	Socialist Party
20th	Antoinette Guhl	Europe Ecology – The Greens
20th	Jacques Baudrier	French Communist Party
20th	Virginie Daspet	Socialist Party
20th	David Assouline	Socialist Party
20th	Marinette Bache	Socialist Party
20th	Jérôme Gleizes	Europe Ecology – The Greens
20th	Raphaëlle Primet	French Communist Party
20th	Frédéric Hocquard	Socialist Party
20th	Nathalie Maquoi	Socialist Party
20th	Atanase Périfan	Union for a Popular Movement
20th	Nathalie Fanfant	Union for a Popular Movement
20th	Danielle Simonnet	Left Party

== 2008–2014 councillors ==
- PCF = French Communist Party
- PG = Left Party
- NC = New Centre (New Centre and Independents)
- PS = Socialist Party
- UMP = Union for a Popular Movement
- EELVA = Europe Ecology – The Greens

Councillor	Party affiliation	Arrondissement
Berthout, Florence	UMP	1st
Legaret, Jean-François	UMP	1st
Raoul, Loïg (Note: Loïg Raoul replaced Seybah Dagoma who resigned 6 December 2012 following her election to the National Assembly.)	PS	1st
Boutault, Jacques	EELVA	2nd
Schapira, Pierre	PS	2nd
Wieviorka, Sylvie	PS	2nd
Aidenbaum, Pierre	PS	3rd
Caron-Thibault, Gauthier	PS	3rd
Montacié, Camille	PS	3rd
Girard, Christophe	PS	4th
Guidi, Claire (Note: Claire Guidi replaced Dominique Bertinotti who was appointed 16 May 2012 to the government.)	PS	4th
Roger, Vincent	UMP	4th
Bach, Marie-Chantal	UMP	5th
Cohen-Solal, Lyne	PS	5th
Saint-Étienne, Christian	NC	5th
Tiberi, Jean	UMP	5th
Bertrand, Geneviève	NC	6th
Lecoq, Jean-Pierre	UMP	6th
Lévy, Romain	PS	6th
Dati, Rachida	UMP	7th
Dauvergne, Emmanuelle	UMP	7th
Dumont, Michel	UMP	7th
Namy-Caulier, Martine	UMP	7th
Pozzo di Borgo, Yves	NC	7th
Lebel, François	UMP	8th
Lellouche, Pierre	UMP	8th
Merigot de Treigny, Martine	UMP	8th
Bravo, Jacques	PS	9th
Bürkli, Delphine	UMP	9th
Morel, Claire (Note: Claire Morel replaced Philippe Torreton who resigned in November 2010.)	PS	9th
Véron, Pauline	PS	9th
Asmani, Lynda (Note: A member of the Union for a Popular Movement group until April 2010.)	NC	10th
Dubarry, Véronique	EELVA	10th
Féraud, Rémi	PS	10th
Gaudillère, Bernard	PS	10th
Lhostis, Alain	PCF	10th
Trostiansky, Olga	PS	10th
Assouline, Daniel	PS	11th
Bidard, Hélène	PCF	11th
Bloche, Patrick	PS	11th
Capelle, Liliane	PS	11th
Ducloux, Philippe	PS	11th
Errecart, Maïté	PS	11th
Flam, Mireille	PS	11th
Martinet, Stéphane (Note: Stéphane Martinet replaced Pascale Boistard who resigned on 20 September 2012 following her election to the National Assembly.)	PS	11th
Sarre, Georges	Non-registered (MRC)	11th
Tissot, Claude-Annick	UMP	11th
Vauglin, François	PS	11th
Blumenthal, Michèle	PS	12th
Charnoz, Sandrine	PS	12th
Corbière, Alexis	PG	12th
Missika, Jean-Louis	PS	12th
Montandon, Valérie	UMP	12th
Najdovski, Christophe	EELVA	12th
Rey, Gérard (Note: Gérard Rey replaced Christine Lagarde who was appointed 5 July 2011 to be Managing Director of the International Monetary Fund.)	NC	12th
Sautter, Christian	PS	12th
Taïeb, Karen	PS	12th
Vieu-Charier, Catherine	PCF	12th
Montandon, Valérie (Note: Valérie Montandon replaced Vincent Casa who died 15 January 2011. Vincent Casa had replaced Jean-Marie Cavada who resigned 16 December 2010.)	UMP	1th
Barthe, Marie-Annick	PS	13th
Becker, Emmanuelle	PCF	13th
Bros, Jean-Bernard	PS	13th
Contassot, Yves	EELVA	13th
Coumet, Jérôme	PS	13th
Cuignache-Gallois, Edith	NC	13th
de La Gontrie, Marie-Pierre	PS	13th
Julliard, Bruno	PS	13th
Lang, Anne-Christine	PS	13th
Le Guen, Jean-Marie	PS	13th
Moine, Philippe	PS	13th
Olivier, Annick	PS	13th
Trémège, Patrick	UMP	13th
Arrouze, Aline	PCF	14th
Carrère-Gée, Marie-Claire	UMP	14th
Cherki, Pascal	PS	14th
Christienne, Odette	PS	14th
Dutrey, René	EELVA	14th
Martins, Jean-François (Note: Jean-François Martins replaced Marielle de Sarnez who resigned in April 2010.)	Non-registered (MoDem)	14th
Mercier, Étienne (Note: Étienne Mercier replaced Pierre Castagnou who died 24 February 2009.)	PS	14th
Polski, Olivia	PS	14th
Pourtaud, Danièle	PS	14th
Sanches Ruivo, Hermano	PS	14th
Alayrac, Gilles	PS	15th
Bruno, Catherine	NC	15th
Charon, Pierre	UMP	15th
Cherioux de Soultrait, Joëlle	UMP	15th
Courtois, Daniel-Georges	UMP	15th
d'Aboville, Gérard	UMP	15th
Dargent, Claude	PS	15th
de Clermont-Tonnerre, Claire	UMP	15th
Fonlladosa, Ghislène (Note: Ghislène Fonlladosa replaced Alain Destrem who resigned in July 2012.)	UMP	15th
Goujon, Philippe	UMP	15th
Hidalgo, Anne	PS	15th
Lalem, Fatima	PS	15th
Lamour Jean-François	UMP	15th
Macé de Lepinay, Hélène	UMP	15th
Menguy, Jean-Baptiste	UMP	15th
Poirault-Gauvin, Géraldine	UMP	15th
Tachene, Anne	NC	15th
Alphand, David	UMP	16th
Auriacombe, Pierre	UMP	16th
Boulay-Esperonnier, Céline	UMP	16th
Debré, Bernard	UMP	16th
Dreyfuss, Laurence (Note: Laurence Dreyfuss replaced Pierre-Christian Taittinger who died 27 September 2009.)	UMP	16th
Gaboriau, Pierre	UMP	16th
Giazzi, Danièle	UMP	16th
Goasguen, Claude	UMP	16th
Harel, Marie-Laure	UMP	16th
Helard, Éric (Note: A member of the Union for a Popular Movement group until April 2010.)	NC	16th
Hoffenberg, Valérie	UMP	16th
Mano, Jean-Yves	PS	16th
Sachs, Valérie	NC	16th
Benessiano, Hervé	UMP	17th
Berthault, Jean-Didier	UMP	17th
Coudert, Thierry	UMP	17th
de Panafieu, Françoise	UMP	17th
Douvin, Laurence	UMP	17th
Dubus, Jérôme	NC	17th
Dumas, Catherine	UMP	17th
Gachet, Isabelle	PS	17th
Gasnier, Fabienne	NC	17th
Klugman, Patrick	PS	17th
Kuster, Brigitte	UMP	17th
Lepetit, Annick	PS	17th
Stein, Richard	UMP	17th
Bournazel, Pierre-Yves	UMP	18th
Bouygues, Claudine	PS	18th
Brossat, Ian	PCF	18th
Caffet, Jean-Pierre	PS	18th
Decorte, Roxane	UMP	18th
Delanoë, Bertrand	PS	18th
El Khomri, Myriam	PS	18th
Fournier, Danielle	EELVA	18th
Garel, Sylvain	EELVA	18th
Goldgrab, Laurence	PS	18th
Guillot, Didier	PS	18th
Le Strat, Anne	PS	18th
Pigeon, Frédérique	PS	18th
Vaillant, Daniel	PS	18th
Brossel, Colombe	PS	19th
Dagnaud, François	PS	19th
Filoche, Léa	PS	19th
Giannesini, Jean-Jacques	UMP	19th
Jemni, Halima	PS	19th
Madec, Roger	PS	19th
Markovitch, Daniel	PS	19th
Onghena, Anne-Constance	UMP	19th
Peninou, Mao	PS	19th
Richard, Firmine	PS	19th
Stievenard, Gisèle	PS	19th
Vuillermoz, Jean	PCF	19th
Assouline, David	PS	20th
Bache, Marinette	PS	20th
Bargeton, Julien	PS	20th
Baupin, Denis	EELVA	20th
Benguigui, Yamina	PS	20th
Bouakkaz, Hamou	PS	20th
Calandra, Frédérique	PS	20th
Charzat, Michel	EELVA	20th
Daspet, Virginie	PS	20th
Giboudeaux, Fabienne	EELVA	20th
Lopez, Katia	EELVA	20th
Mansat, Pierre	PCF	20th
Simonnet, Danielle	PG	20th

== See also ==
- Council of Paris
- 2014 Paris municipal election
