= Pierre Aidenbaum =

French politician

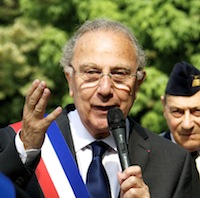

Mayor of the 3rd arrondissement of Paris
- In office 18 June 1995 – 11 July 2020
- Preceded by: Jacques Dominati
- Succeeded by: Ariel Weil (as mayor of Paris Centre)

Councillor of Paris
- In office 12 March 1989 – 12 November 2020

President of the LICRA
- In office 1993–1997
- Preceded by: Jean Pierre-Bloch
- Succeeded by: Patrick Gaubert

Personal details
- Born: 3 May 1942 (age 84) Le Puy-en-Velay, France
- Party: Socialist Party

Pierre Bernard Aidenbaum (né Ajdenbaum; born 3 May 1942) is a French politician. A member of the Socialist Party (PS), he was a member of the Council of Paris from 1989 to 2020, and mayor of the 3rd arrondissement of Paris from 1995 to 2020. Born to a Jewish family during the German occupation of France, he was the president of the International League Against Racism and Anti-Semitism (LICRA) from 1993 to 1997.

== Biography ==
Aidenbaum was born in Le Puy-en-Velay to a family of Polish Jewish origin who were living under false identities due to persecution in World War II.

In 1992, he became the president of the International League Against Racism and Anti-Semitism (LICRA). During his presidency, LICRA was one of eleven civil rights groups to file complaints against far-right politician Jean-Marie Le Pen for trivialising the Holocaust; in 1997 Le Pen was fined the equivalent of US$ 17,000 to each group. Aidenbaum was succeeded by his vice-president Patrick Gaubert in 1999.

Aidenbaum was elected mayor of the 3rd arrondissement of Paris in July 1995, succeeding Jacques Dominati. He remained in office until the council was dissolved in July 2020 as the first four arrondissements became Paris Centre. He was also on the Council of Paris from 1989. In July 2020, he became deputy mayor to Anne Hidalgo, being put in charge of the river Seine with the aim of making the heavily polluted and off-limits river safe for public swimming by the time that Paris hosts the 2024 Summer Olympics. In 2018, he supported Hidalgo's plan to pedestrianise the centre of Paris, as long as it was done gradually in respect to businesses. In 2017, he renamed the Square du Temple park after the recently deceased Jewish activist Elie Wiesel.

He resigned as deputy mayor in September 2020 due to accusations of sexual assault. He resigned his council seat in November, having been charged with rape.

He was made a Knight of the Legion of Honour in 1999 and an Officer of the same order in 2013.
