= David Belliard =

French journalist and politician

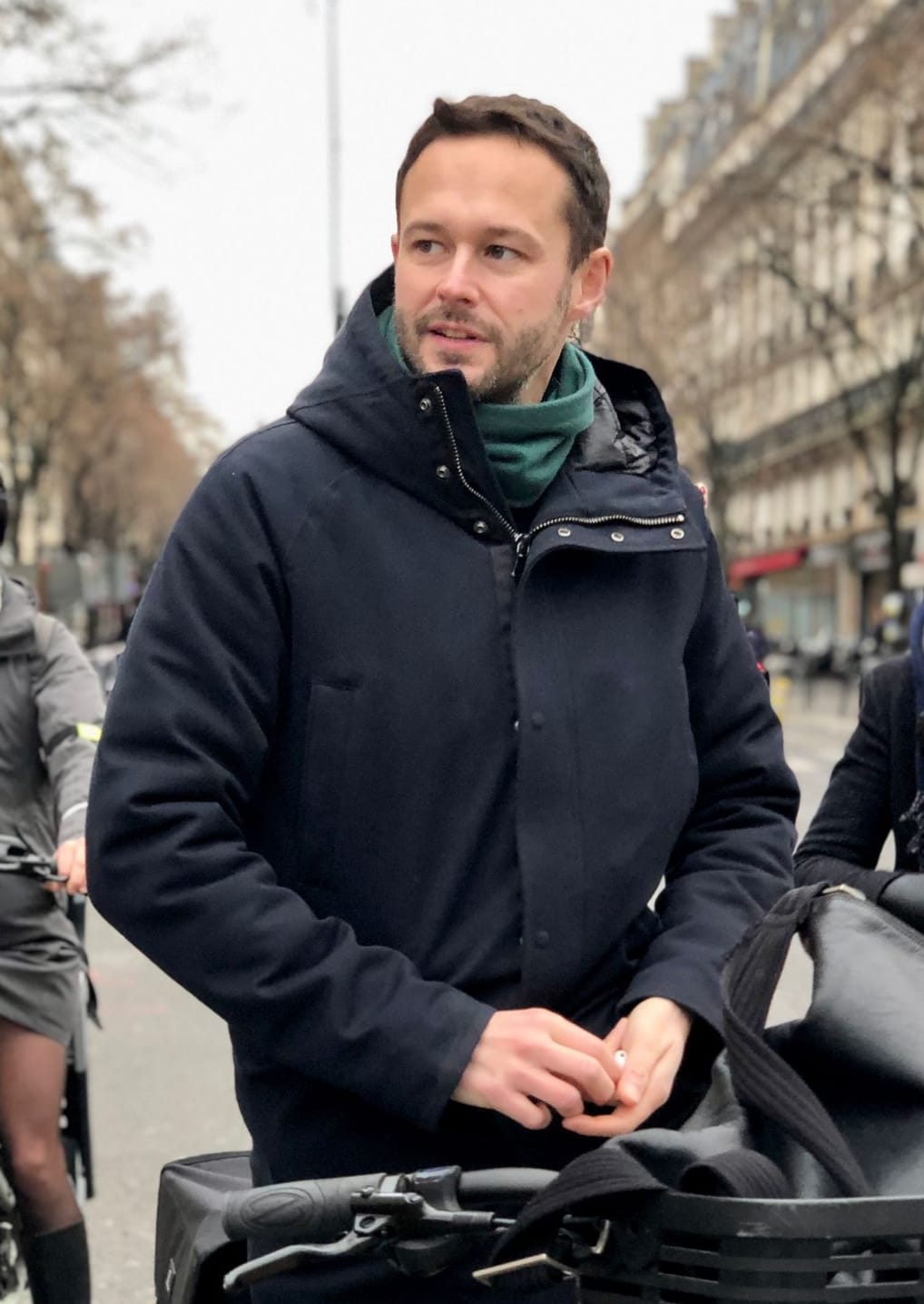
- David Belliard in 2021

Mayor of the 11th arrondissement of Paris
- Incumbent
- Assumed office 6 April 2026
- Preceded by: François Vauglin

Deputy Mayor of Paris
- In office 3 July 2020 – 29 March 2026
- Mayor: Anne Hidalgo
- Preceded by: Christophe Najdovski

Councillor of Paris
- Incumbent
- Assumed office 6 April 2014
- Mayor: Anne Hidalgo; Emmanuel Grégoire
- Constituency: 11th arrondissement

Personal details
- Born: 29 May 1978 (age 48) La Teste-de-Buch, France
- Party: Europe Ecology – The Greens
- Education: EDHEC Business School

David Belliard (born 29 May 1978) is a French politician. From 2014 to 2020, he was the leader of the Green Party faction at the Council of Paris. He ran for mayor of Paris in the 2020 municipal election as the Ecologist candidate. As of July 2020, he serves as a member of the executive team to the Mayor of Paris, Anne Hidalgo, in charge of the transformation of public spaces, as well as transportation, mobility, rules and regulations on city streets, and the management of roads.

== Early life ==
Belliard was born on 29 May 1978 in La Teste-de-Buch and was raised in Augicourt, near Vesoul, in rural France, in a working-class family. His father was a bricklayer and his mother a cleaning woman. To this day, Belliard refers to himself as a "son of proletarians". He wrote a book about his mother, her illness, and his devastation after she died in 2020.

After studying in Nancy, he attended EdHEC, a business school in Lille, borrowing money and working to finance his studies.

After a first experience as a consultant, which he describes as "inconclusive", he moved to Paris in 2000 to work as a journalist for Alternatives économiques, a post he has continued part-time since being elected to the City Council during the 2014 municipal election.

== Activism ==
David Belliard, who is openly gay, became Deputy Chief Executive of Sidaction in 2008.

== Politics ==
David Belliard joined the Green Party in 2002 and has been an active member since. He played a role in the 2009 campaign for the European Parliament and in the transformation of the "Greens" to "Europe Ecology-The Greens". He was elected to the Council of Paris as a Councillor for the 11th arrondissement of Paris in the 2014 election. He has served as a metropolitan advisor for the Metropole du Grand Paris since its creation in December 2015.

In March 2019, Belliard put forward his candidacy for mayor as the Green Party candidate in the 2020 municipal elections. He won the nomination on 1 June 2019 with 49.61% of the party vote, placing ahead of the other candidate, Julien Bayou.

On 11 February 2020, Belliard said that while he condemned violence against individuals and property, it was important to understand the root causes behind the invasion of BlackRock's headquarters by ecological activists in Paris.

After the first round of the Paris municipal election, Belliard and Europe Ecology-The Greens negotiated a common political program and hybrid electoral list with Paris En Commun, resulting in an alliance for the second round of the election. At the city level, this coalition won the election with 48.70% of all votes.

As of 3 July 2020, Belliard serves as a member of the executive team to the Mayor of Paris, Anne Hidalgo, responsible for the transformation of public spaces, as well as transportation, mobility, rules and regulations on city streets, and the management of roads.

Succeeding Christophe Najdovski, he advocates for a policy to reduce the role of cars in densely populated urban areas like Paris. He plans the project to expand bike lanes in Paris to make the capital “100% bike-friendly.” He promotes free public transportation for young Parisians up to 18 years old. He announces his intention to “remove half of the parking spaces in Paris” by launching a large program to transform surface parking spots and holding “general assemblies on parking”. He initiates the creation of 300 “school streets” aimed at eliminating or reducing car traffic near Parisian schools. He leads the project to create a limited traffic zone in central Paris and commits to transforming the Périphérique ring road to reduce traffic. In September 2022, after years of debate, he makes parking for thermal motorcycles and scooters in Paris payable.

These actions have made him the target of death threats.

In January 2024, he opposes the sale of the Parc des Princes stadium to Paris Saint-Germain (PSG), owned by a Qatari sovereign wealth fund. He is accused of racism by Nasser al-Khelaïfi, the CEO of PSG. He repeatedly opposes the Mayor of Paris, Anne Hidalgo, starting in 2020. First in the so-called Girard affair, where feminist ecological elected officials demand the resignation of Christophe Girard, then Deputy for Culture in Paris. He supports the elected officials who accuse Christophe Girard of supporting the writer Gabriel Matzneff, thereby highlighting political tolerance toward pedocriminality. He also criticizes Anne Hidalgo's remarks accusing the ecologists of maintaining an ambiguity with the Republic, provoking a serious crisis in the municipal majority.

Since September 14, 2020, he has been president of the Paris City Real Estate Management (Régie immobilière de la ville de Paris, RIVP), which manages 61,000 social housing units.

He publicly supports Yannick Jadot for the ecological primary ahead of the 2022 presidential election. He becomes one of Jadot's political advisers during the campaign.

In 2025, defending the record of the outgoing municipal majority, he announces his intention to run again in the ecological primary for the 2026 municipal elections in Paris. He is designated as the ecological candidate on March 23.

== Books ==
- Nous ne sommes pas coupables d’être malades, avec Alix Béranger, éditions Petits matins, 2010
- Notre santé est-elle à vendre ?, éditions Textuel, 2012
- Paris, rêve de gosse, 2020
- Et soudain tout s’éteint, Stock
