= Agnès Evren =

French politician (born 1970)

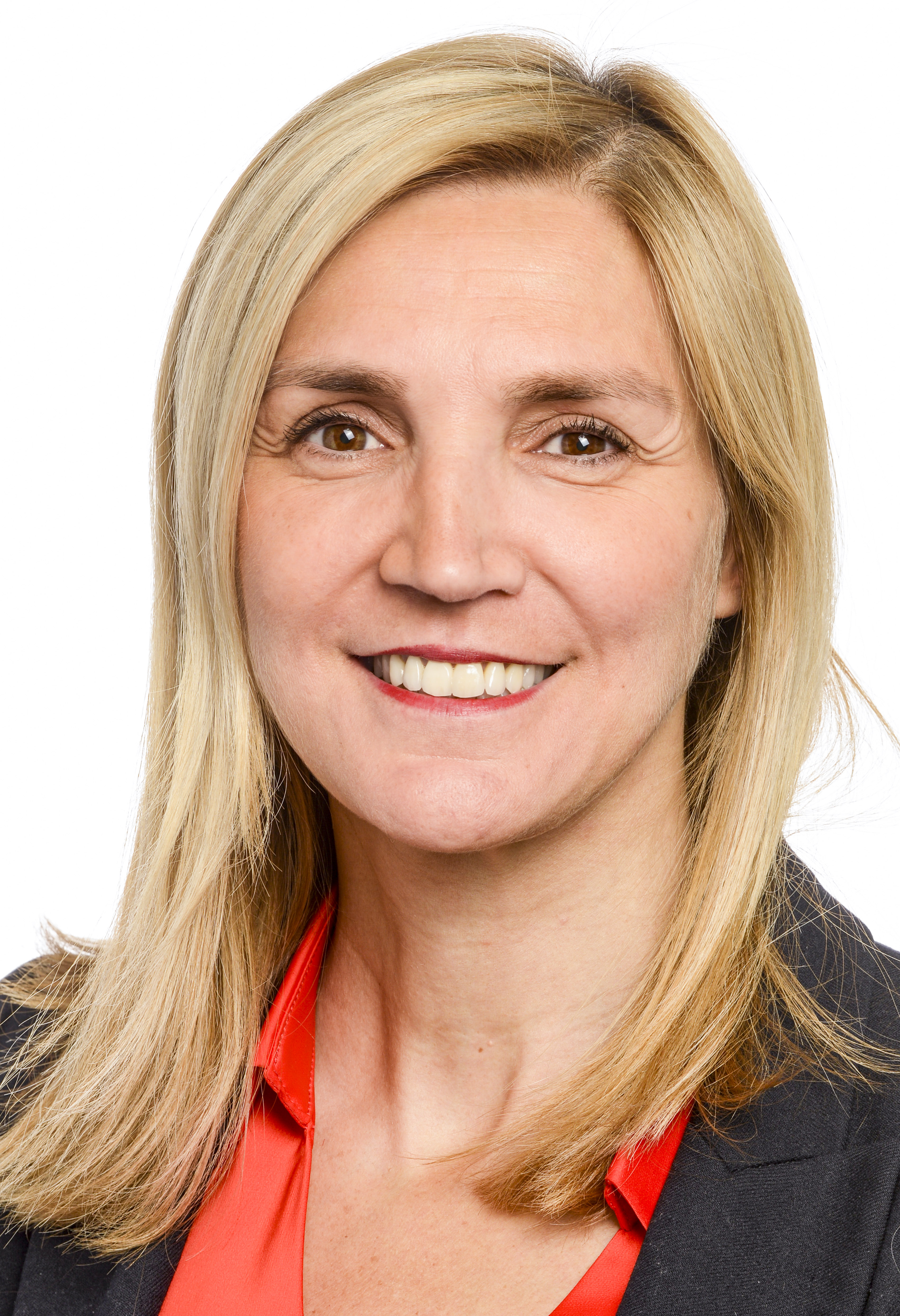

Senator for Paris
- Incumbent
- Assumed office 2 October 2023

Member of the European Parliament
- In office 2 July 2019 – 23 September 2023
- Constituency: France

Personal details
- Born: 27 December 1970 (age 55) Paris, France
- Party: The Republicans
- Education: Paris 1 Panthéon-Sorbonne University

Agnès Evren (French pronunciation: [aɲɛs ɛvʁɛn]; born 27 December 1970) is a French politician of The Republicans (LR) who has been serving as a Senator for Paris since 2023. She was previously elected a Member of the European Parliament (MEP) in 2019.

== Early life ==
Evren is of Turkish origin and grew up as one of nine children in her family.

== Political career ==
=== Career in regional politics ===
Ahead of the 2014 Paris municipal election, Evren joined the campaign team of LR candidate Nathalie Kosciusko-Morizet as spokesperson.

Evren served as Valérie Pécresse’s spokesperson when she ran in the 2015 regional elections. When Pécresse became head of the Regional Council of Île-de-France, she was elected one of its vice presidents, in charge of education and culture.

=== Member of the European Parliament, 2019–2023 ===
Evren became a member of the European Parliament in 2019. In parliament, she served on the Committee on the Environment, Public Health and Food Safety and on the Committee on Petitions.

In addition to her committee assignments, Evren was part of the parliament's delegations for relations to Afghanistan, Palestine and to the Parliamentary Assembly of the Union for the Mediterranean. She was also a member of the European Parliament Intergroup on Climate Change, Biodiversity and Sustainable Development and the URBAN Intergroup.

In 2018, Evren was named spokesperson for Pécresse's Soyons libres (SL) movement. Later that year, she left SL again to chair the Paris chapter of LR.

Since the 2020 elections, Evren has been serving as a member of the Council of Paris, representing the city's 15th arrondissement. For the campaign, she received a public endorsement by Rachida Dati.

Ahead of the 2022 French presidential election, LR chairman Christian Jacob appointed Evren and Gilles Platret as the party's spokespeople. She subsequently served as one of the spokespersons of Pécresse's campaign team.

In 2023, Evren left the European Parliament and was replaced by Laurence Sailliet.

=== Member of the Senate, 2023–present ===
Evren was elected to be Senator for Paris in the 2023, during which The Republicans – led by Bruno Retailleau – emerged as the largest group for the fourth consecutive cycle.

In the Republicans' 2025 leadership election, Evren endorsed Retailleau to succeed Éric Ciotti as the party's new chair.

== Personal life ==
Evren is married and has two children.
