= François Dagnaud =

French politician (born 1962)

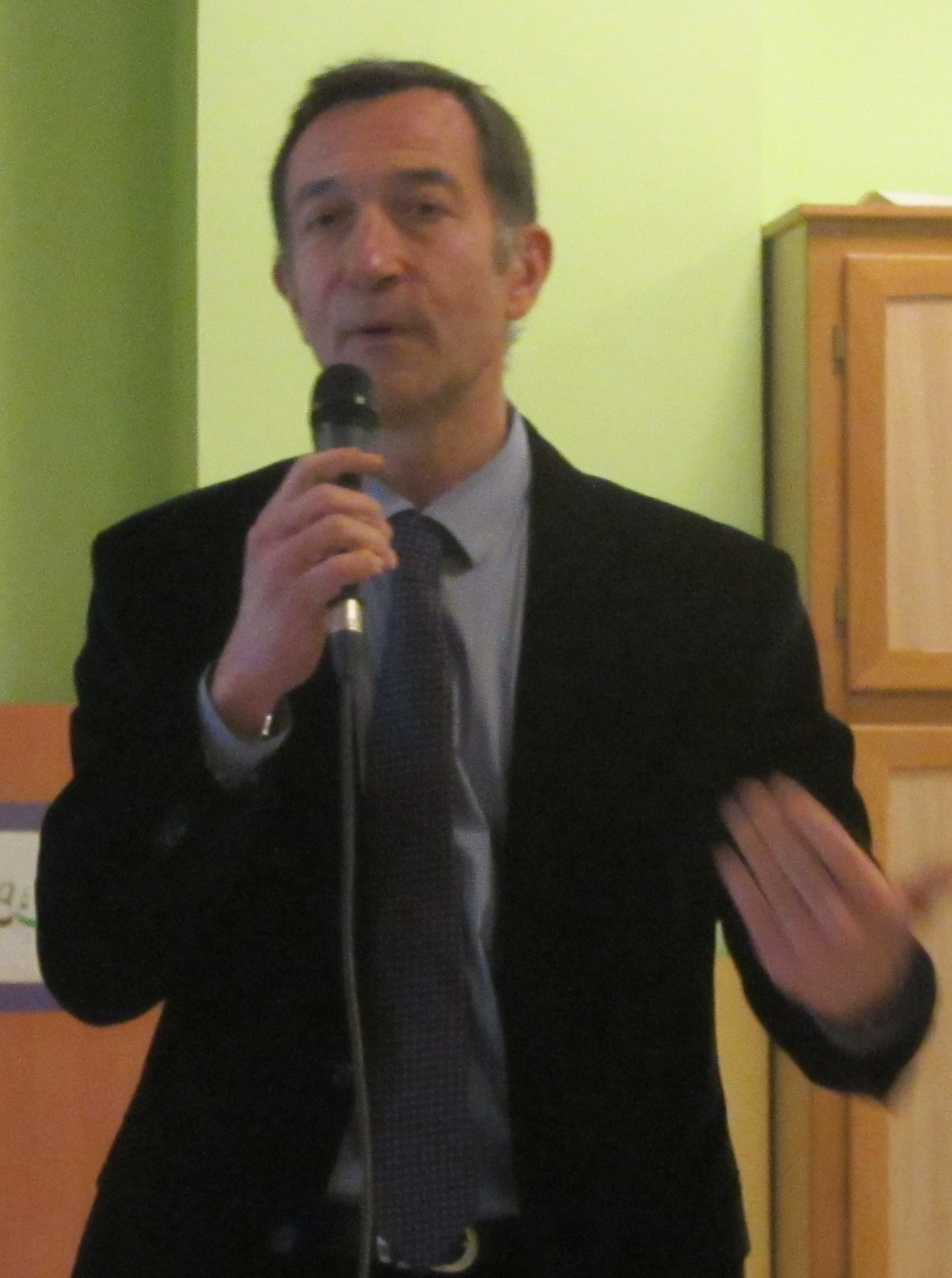
- Dagnaud in 2013

Mayor of the 19th arrondissement of Paris
- Incumbent
- Assumed office 4 February 2013
- Preceded by: Roger Madec

Councillor of Paris
- Incumbent
- Assumed office 18 June 1995
- Mayor: Jean Tiberi; Bertrand Delanoë; Anne Hidalgo

Personal details
- Born: 4 January 1962 (age 64) Jonzac, Charente-Maritime, France
- Party: Socialist Party
- Education: Institut d'études politiques de Bordeaux

François Dagnaud (born 4 January 1962) is a French politician of the Socialist Party. Since 2013, he has served as mayor of the 19th arrondissement of Paris. He has been a member of the Council of Paris since 1995, and was a deputy mayor of Paris from 2001 to 2013. From 2001 to 2014, he served as president of Syctom. In the 2017 legislative election, he was the substitute candidate of Jean-Christophe Cambadélis for Paris's 16th constituency.
