= Omnibus (film) =

1992 film

- Poster
- Directed by: Sam Karmann
- Written by: Sam Karmann; Christian Rauth
- Produced by: Anne Bennet
- Starring: Daniel Rialet; Jacques Martial
- Cinematography: Daniel Diot
- Edited by: Robert Rongier
- Production company: Lazennec Tout Court
- Distributed by: MK2 Productions
- Release date: May 1992
- Running time: 8 minutes
- Country: France
- Language: French

Omnibus is a 1992 French short comedy film directed by Sam Karmann. It won an Oscar in 1993 for Best Short Subject and it won the Short Film Palme d'Or at the 1992 Cannes Film Festival.

== Cast ==
- Daniel Rialet - The Man
- Jacques Martial - The Conductor
- Christian Rauth - The Driver
- Jean-Chrétien Sibertin-Blanc
- Brigitte Auber
