= Rémi Féraud =

French politician (born 1971)

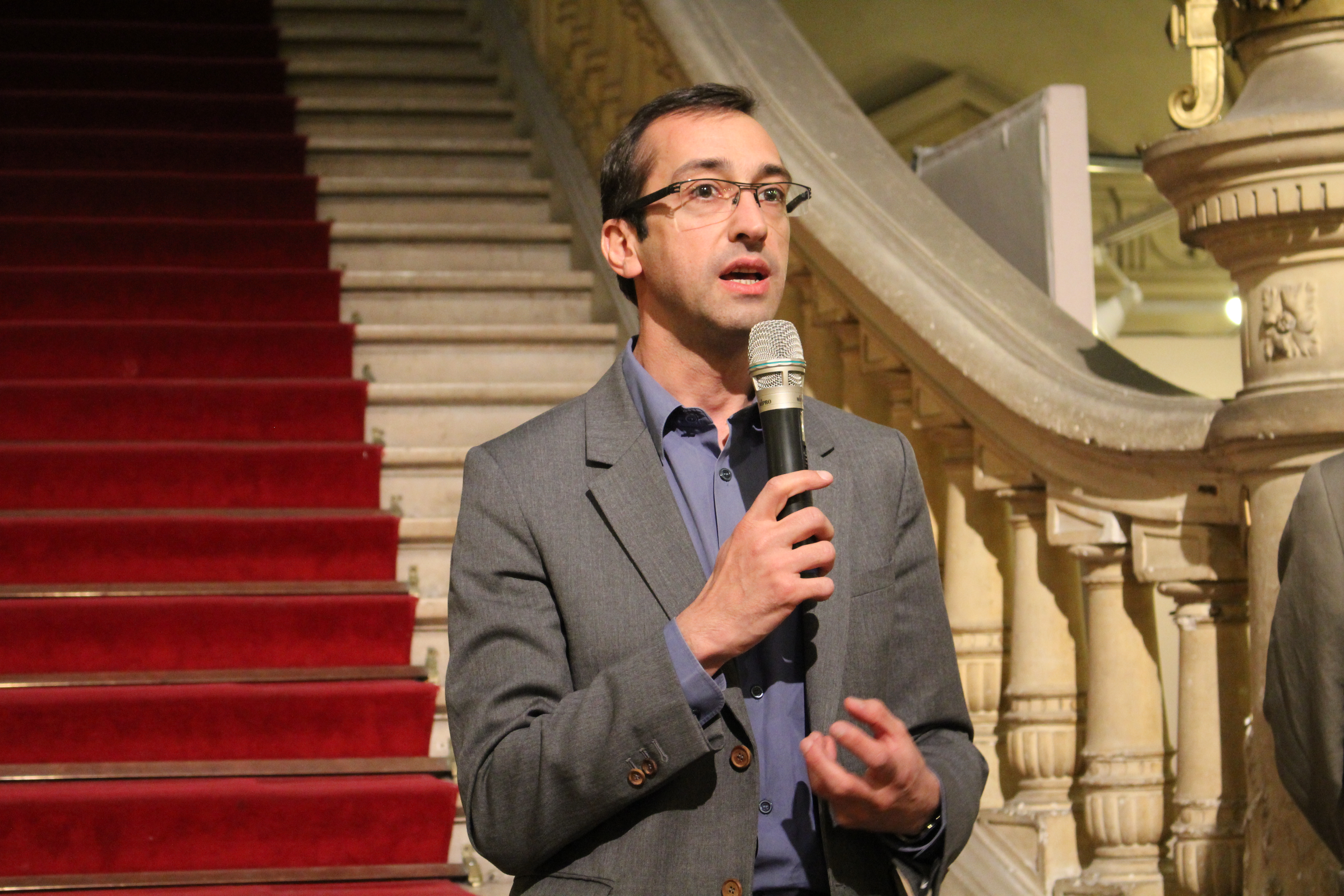
- Féraud in 2015

Member of the Senate
- Incumbent
- Assumed office 1 October 2017
- Constituency: Paris

Mayor of the 10th arrondissement of Paris
- In office 29 March 2008 – 19 October 2017
- Preceded by: Tony Dreyfus
- Succeeded by: Alexandra Cordebard

Personal details
- Born: 24 August 1971 (age 54)
- Party: Socialist Party

Rémi Féraud (born 24 August 1971) is a French politician of the Socialist Party. Since 2017, he has been a member of the Senate. From 2008 to 2017, he served as mayor of the 10th arrondissement of Paris. He was elected member of the Council of Paris in the 2008, 2014 and 2020 municipal elections, and serves as group leader of Paris en Commun in the council.

In 2024, Féraud was named as the preferred successor to the role of Mayor of Paris by outgoing Mayor Anne Hidalgo after she announced that she would not be seeking a third term.
