= Patrick Gaubert =

French politician (born 1948)

Member of the European Parliament
- In office 2004–2009
- Constituency: Île-de-France

President of International League against Racism and Anti-Semitism
- In office 1999–2010
- Preceded by: Pierre Aidenbaum
- Succeeded by: Alain Jakubowicz

Personal details
- Born: Patrick Goldenberg; 6 July 1948 (age 77) Paris, France
- Party: UMP
- Profession: Dentist

Patrick Gaubert (born 6 July 1948) is a Paris-born French politician who was a Member of the European Parliament for the Île-de-France through 2009. He is a member of the Union for a Popular Movement, which is part of the European People's Party, and was vice-chair of the European Parliament's Committee on Civil Liberties, Justice and Home Affairs. He was also a substitute for the Committee on Foreign Affairs and a member of the delegation for relations with Israel.

Gaubert was one of six Members of the European Parliament who participated in the European Union's observer mission in Togo for the October 2007 Togolese parliamentary election.
