= Roger Madec =

French politician (1950–2024)

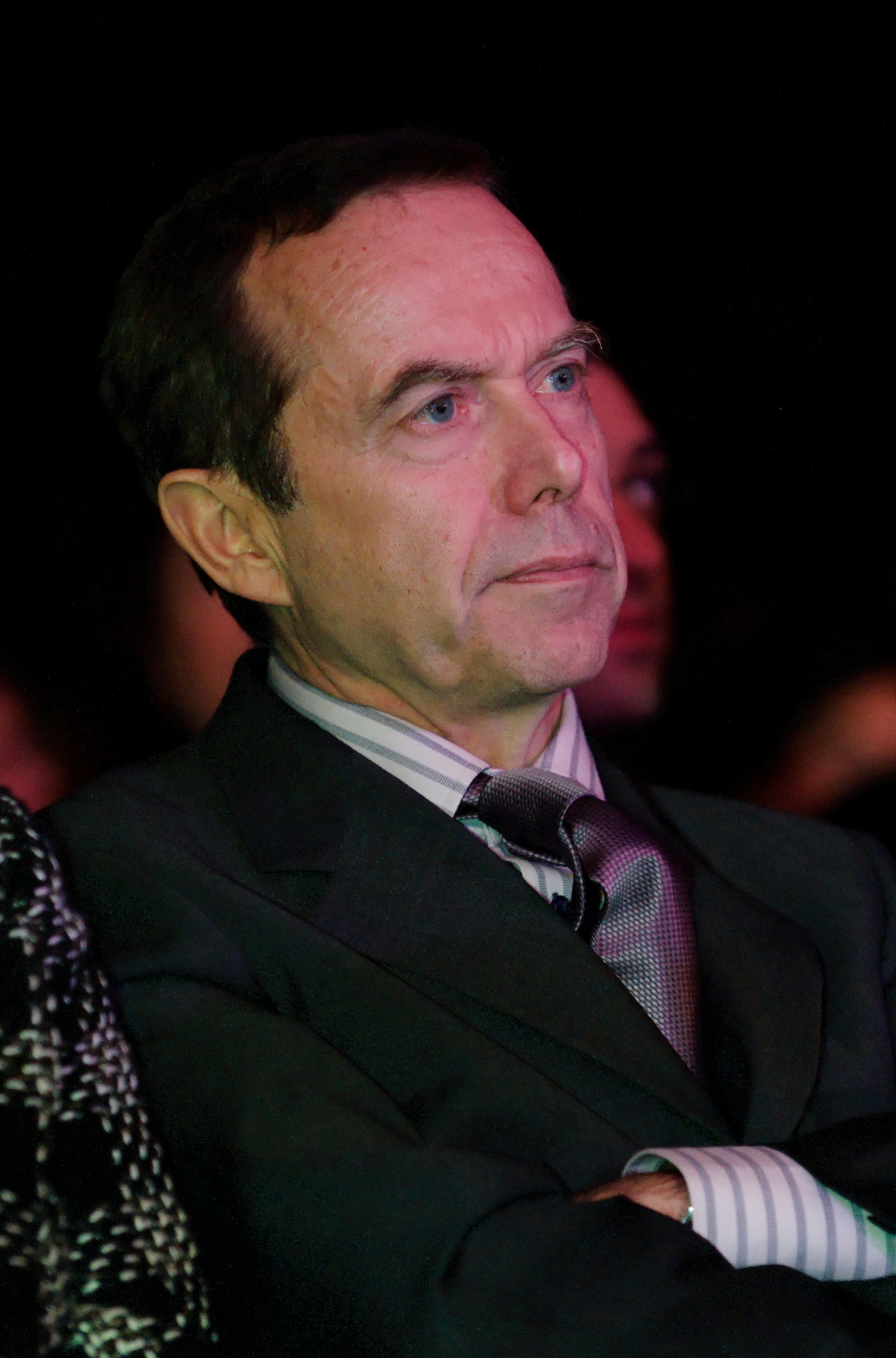
- Madec in 2008

Councillor of Paris
- In office 19 March 1989 – 9 December 2024
- Mayor: Jacques Chirac; Jean Tiberi; Bertrand Delanoë; Anne Hidalgo

Member of the French Senate for Paris
- In office 1 October 2004 – 1 October 2017

Mayor of the 19th arrondissement of Paris
- In office 25 June 1995 – 4 February 2013
- Preceded by: Michel Bulté
- Succeeded by: François Dagnaud

Personal details
- Born: Roger Jean Marcel Madec; 27 October 1950; Paris, France
- Died: 9 December 2024 (aged 74); Verdelot, Seine-et-Marne, France
- Political party: Socialist Party

Roger Madec (27 October 1950 – 9 December 2024) was a French politician who was a member of the Senate, representing the city of Paris. He was a member of the Socialist Party. Madec died in Seine-et-Marne on 9 December 2024, at the age of 74.

== Sources ==
- Page on the Senate website
