= Florence Berthout =

Mayor of 5th arrondissement of Paris

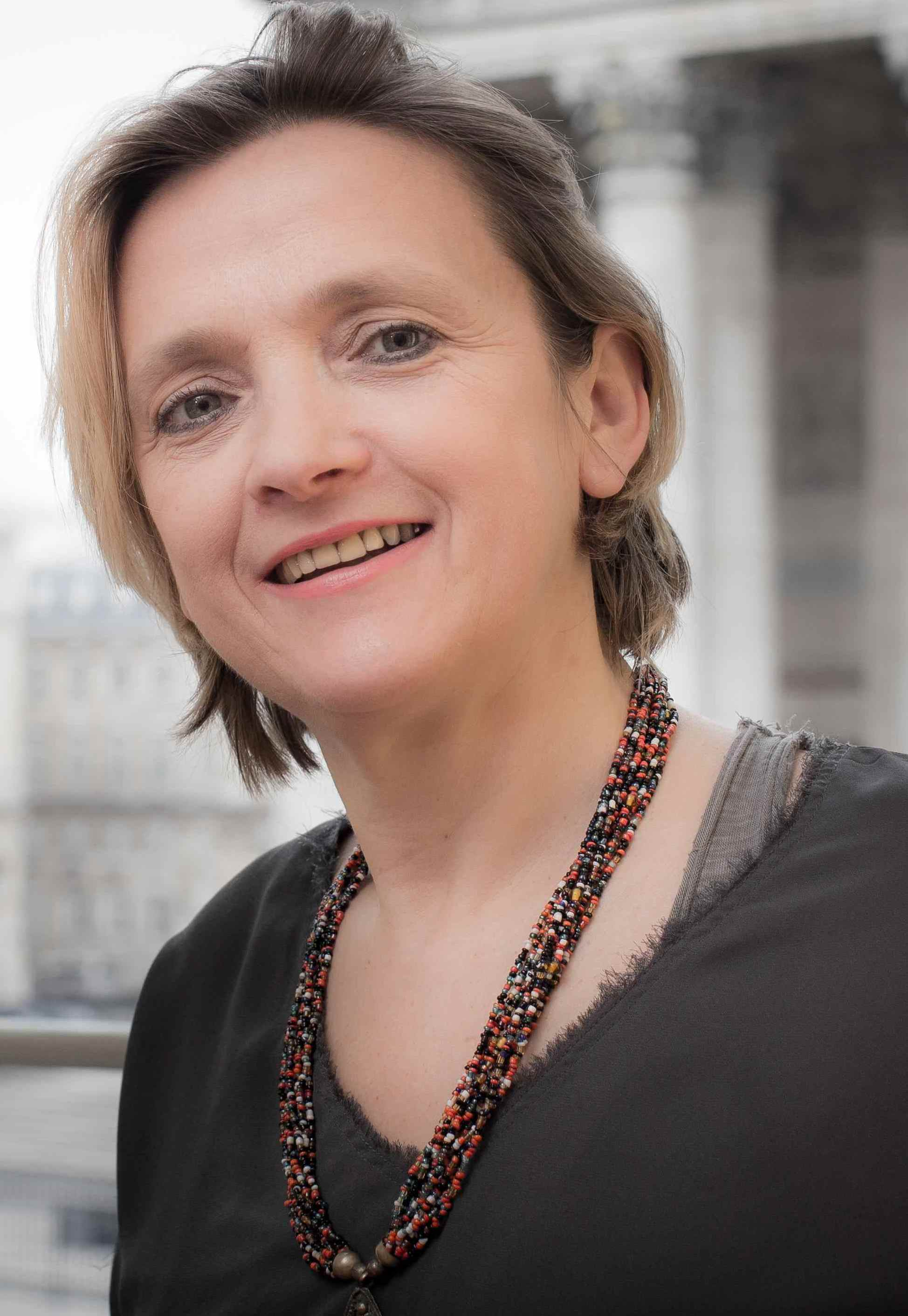
- Florence Berthout in 2014

Mayor of the 5th arrondissement of Paris
- Incumbent
- Assumed office 13 April 2014
- Preceded by: Jean Tiberi

Councillor of Paris
- Incumbent
- Assumed office 18 March 2001
- Mayor: Bertrand Delanoë; Anne Hidalgo

Personal details
- Born: 25 June 1962 (age 64) Houdan, France
- Party: Soyons libres
- Education: Sciences Po Bordeaux

Florence Berthout (born 25 June 1962) is a French politician of Soyons libres (SL) who served as mayor of 5th arrondissement of Paris since 2014.

In 2019, Berthout left LR and expressed her support for President Emmanuel Macron.
