= Jérôme Coumet =

French politician (born 1967)

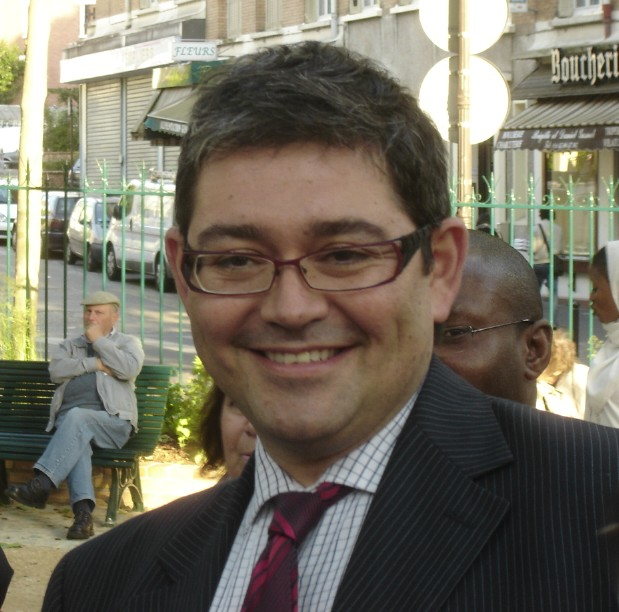
- Coumet in 2009

Mayor of the 13th arrondissement of Paris
- Incumbent
- Assumed office 12 July 2007
- Preceded by: Serge Blisko

Councillor of Paris
- Incumbent
- Assumed office 18 March 2001
- Mayor: Bertrand Delanoë; Anne Hidalgo

Personal details
- Born: 22 January 1967 (age 59) Paris, France
- Party: Socialist Party
- Education: Paris 1 Panthéon-Sorbonne University

Jérôme Coumet (born 22 January 1967) is a French politician of the Socialist Party. Since 2007, he has served as mayor of the 13th arrondissement of Paris. From 2001 to 2007, he served as first deputy mayor of the arrondissement. He has been a member of the Council of Paris since 2001, and a member of the metropolitan council of Grand Paris since 2016. Until 2017, he was a member of the Socialist Party.
