= Alain Jakubowicz =

French lawyer

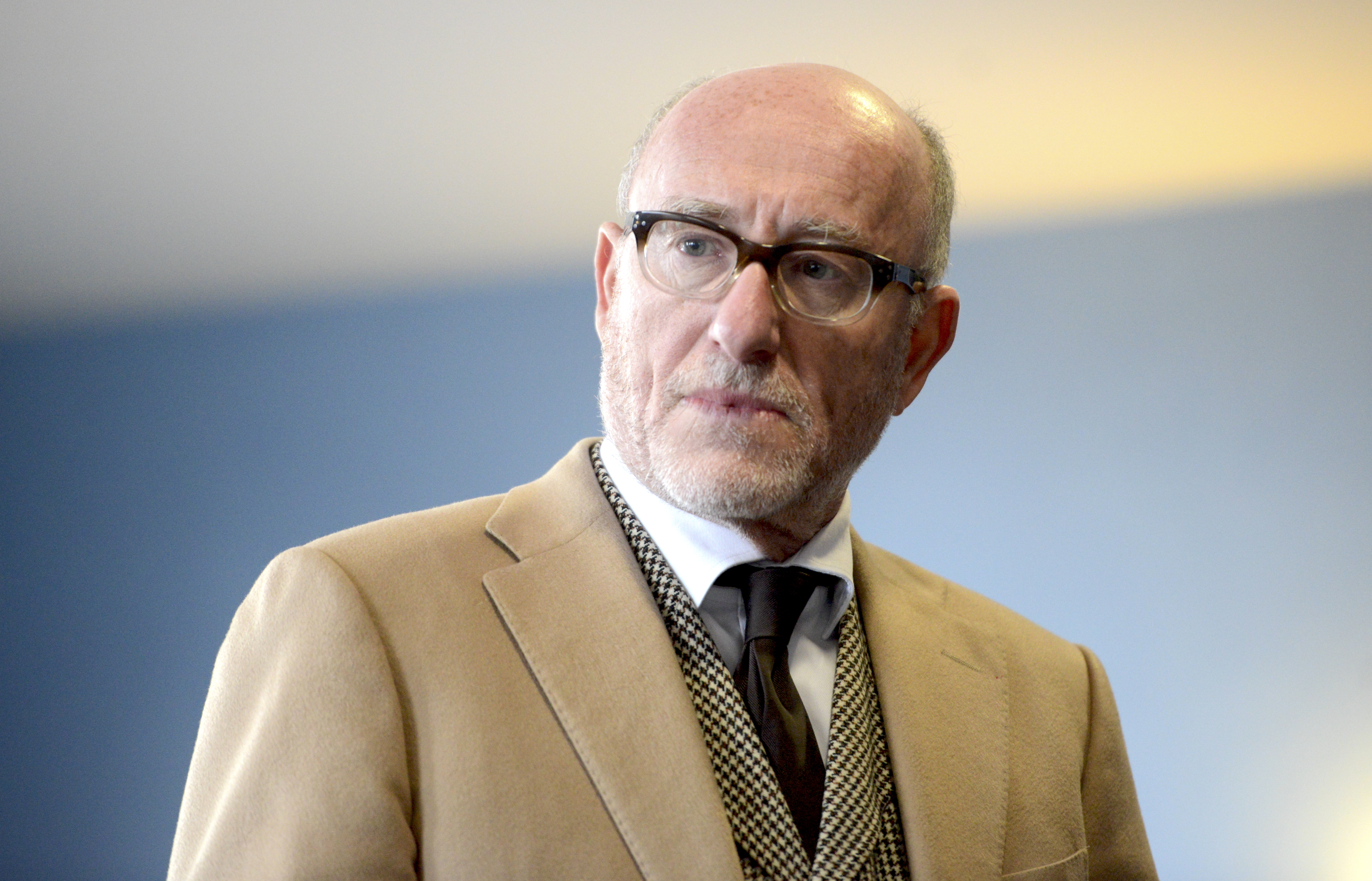

President of the International League against Racism and Anti-Semitism
- In office 2010–2017
- Preceded by: Patrick Gaubert
- Succeeded by: Mario Stasi

Personal details
- Born: 2 May 1953 (age 72) Villeurbanne, France
- Profession: Lawyer

Alain Jakubowicz (born 2 May 1953) is a French lawyer from Villeurbanne, in the suburbs of Lyon.

He was the president of the LICRA from January 31, 2010 to November 6, 2017.

He is also known for defending Nordahl Lelandais during the Maëlys de Araujo case.

== Biography ==
Alain Jakubowicz's parents, Jews from Poland and Austria, migrated to France in 1933. His father founded a spindle manufacturing company in Lyon.
