= Éric Lejoindre =

French politician (born 1980)

Mayor of the 18th arrondissement of Paris
- Incumbent
- Assumed office 13 April 2014
- Preceded by: Daniel Vaillant

Personal details
- Born: 17 May 1980 (age 46)
- Party: Socialist Party

Éric Lejoindre (born 17 May 1980) is a French politician of the Socialist Party. Since 2014, he has served as mayor of the 18th arrondissement of Paris. Until his election as mayor, he served as first deputy mayor of the arrondissement. He has been a member of the Council of Paris since 2014, and serves as a deputy group leader of Paris en Commun. In the 2017 legislative election, he was the substitute candidate of Colombe Brossel for Paris's 17th constituency.
