= Danièle Giazzi =

French politician

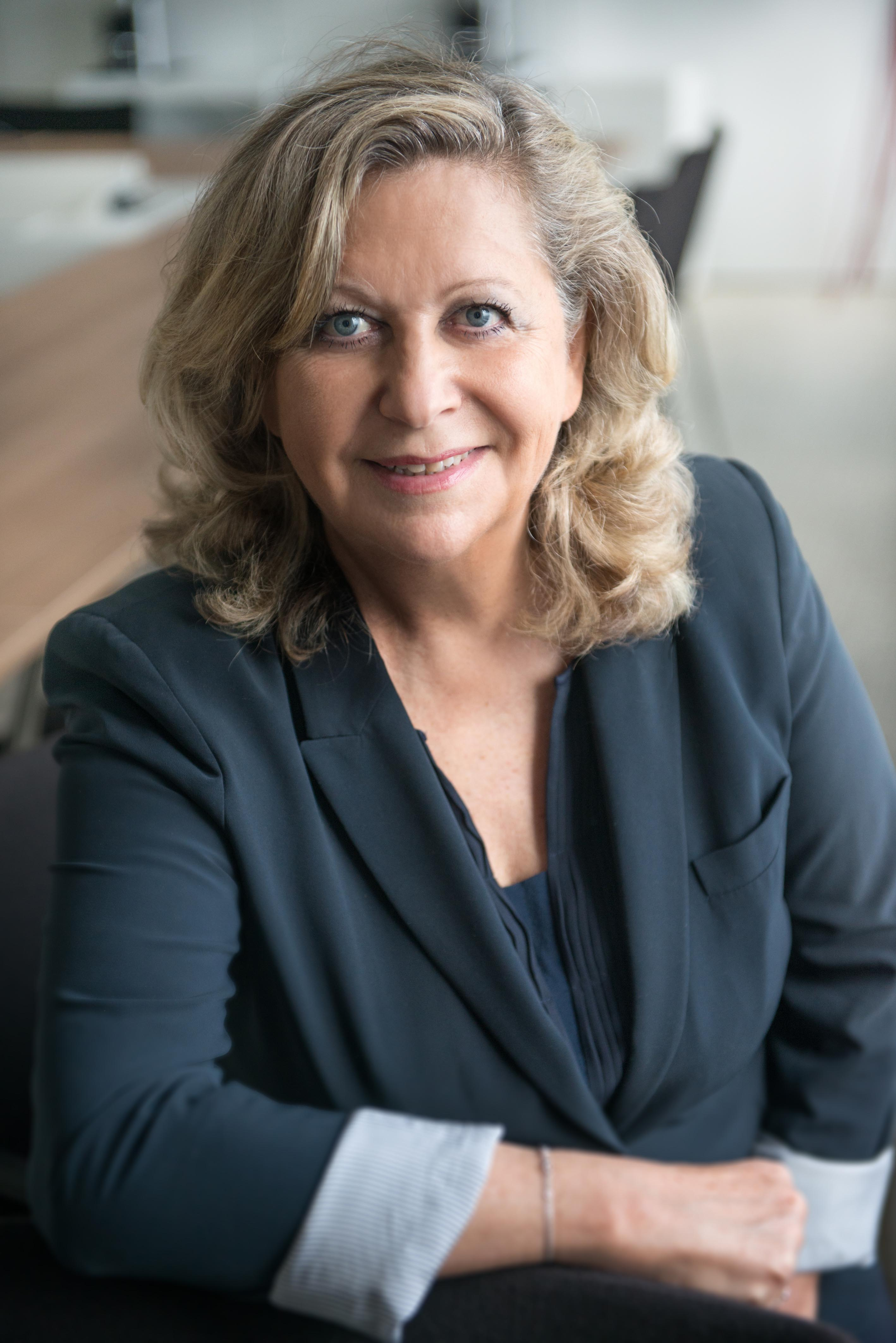
- Danièle Giazzi in 2014

Mayor of the 16th arrondissement of Paris
- In office 11 July 2017 – 11 July 2020
- Preceded by: Claude Goasguen
- Succeeded by: Francis Szpiner

Councillor of Paris
- In office 24 March 1989 – 28 June 2020
- Mayor: Jacques Chirac; Jean Tiberi; Bertrand Delanoë; Anne Hidalgo

Personal details
- Born: 3 September 1955 (age 70) Lausanne, Switzerland
- Party: The Republicans
- Profession: Pharmacist

Danièle Giazzi (born 3 September 1955) is a French politician, the mayor of the 16th arrondissement of Paris between 2017 and 2020.
