= Alexandra Cordebard =

French politician (born 1967)

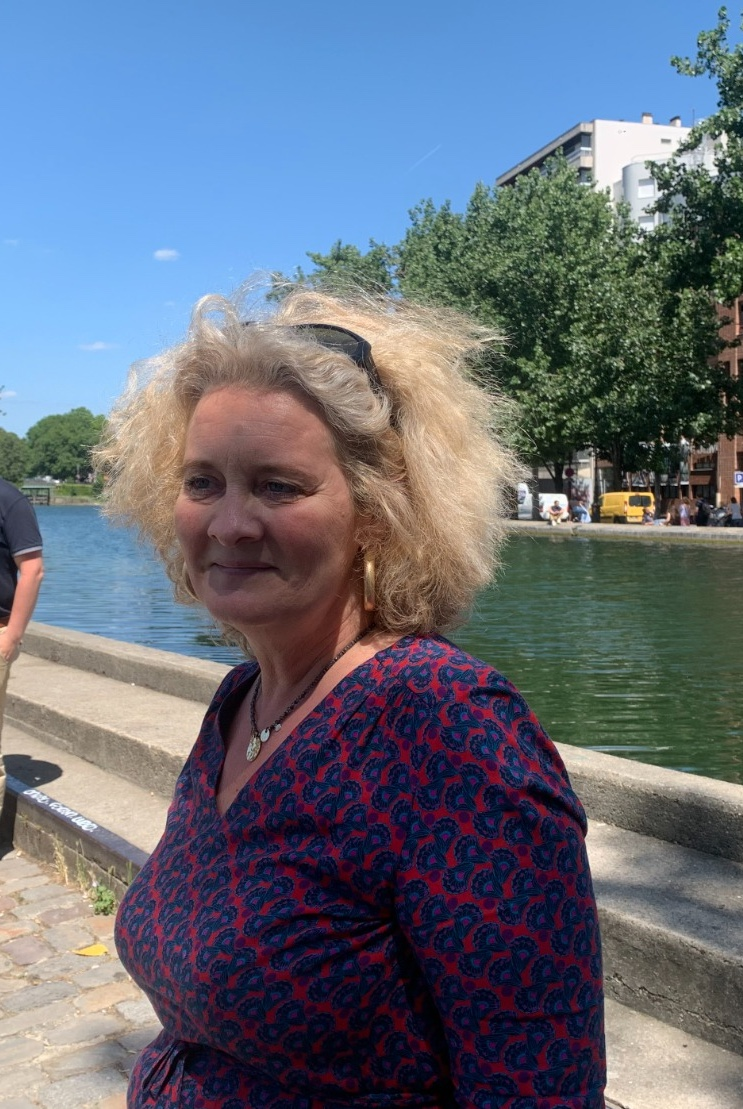

Mayor of the 10th arrondissement of Paris
- Incumbent
- Assumed office 19 October 2017
- Preceded by: Rémi Féraud

Personal details
- Born: 1 January 1967 (age 59)
- Party: Socialist Party

Alexandra Cordebard (born 1 January 1967) is a French politician of the Socialist Party. Since 2017, she has served as mayor of the 10th arrondissement of Paris. She has been a member of the Council of Paris since 2014, and served as a deputy mayor of Paris from 2014 to 2017.
