= Nelly Garnier =

French politician (born 1985)

Vice President of The Republicans
- In office 18 January 2023 – 22 May 2025
- President: Éric Ciotti

Personal details
- Born: 8 January 1985 (age 41)
- Party: The Republicans

Nelly Garnier (born 8 January 1985) is a French politician. She has been a member of the Regional Council of Île-de-France since 2021, and serves as special delegate for research and higher education. She has been a member of the Council of Paris and the municipal arrondissement council of the 11th arrondissement since 2020. From 2023 to 2025, she served as vice president of The Republicans. In 2023, she was appointed shadow minister of women's rights in the shadow cabinet of Éric Ciotti.
