= Frédéric Péchenard =

French civil servant

Member of the Council of Paris
- Incumbent
- Assumed office 30 March 2014

Head of the National Police
- In office 2007–2012
- President: Nicolas Sarkozy
- Succeeded by: Claude Baland

Personal details
- Born: 12 March 1957 (age 69) Neuilly-sur-Seine, France
- Party: The Republicans
- Education: Lycée Carnot

Frédéric Péchenard (born 12 March 1957 in Neuilly-sur-Seine) is a French police officer and high civil servant with the Ministry of the Interior. He has served as General Director of the French National Police from 11 June 2007 to May 2012.

== Biography ==
Péchenard studied at Lycée Carnot and earned a Master in Law. In 1981, he joined the Ecole nationale supérieure de la police. Two years later, he headed the commissariat of Chaillot for one year, before being transferred as leader of the investigation unit of the 2nd division of the Police Judiciaire. From 1988 to 1990, he headed a section at the Drugs and Proxenetism Brigade.

Péchenard headed the Anti-terrorism section of the Criminal Brigade from 1990 to 1991, after which he served as adjoint chief of the BRI. In May 1993, he was the second in command at the BRB during the Neuilly kindergarten affair.

Between 1994 and 1996, he was chief of the Criminal Brigade, before rising to commissaire divisionnaire and heading the BRB. From 2000, he supervised the Criminal Brigade at the Direction de la police judiciaire at the Prefecture of Police.

In December 2003, he was made sub-director of economic and financial affairs, before being promoted to contrôleur général in 2004.

In 2006, he was promoted to directeur des services actifs of the Prefecture of Police, in charge of the regional criminal police. The same year, he was awarded a Big Brother Award by Privacy International for promoting the FNAEG

Starting 11 June 2007, Péchenard has served as General director of National Police. On 11 March 2009, he was also made a préfet hors cadre, with a public service mission from the Government. He was dismissed by the new French Homeland Security minister Manuel Valls in May 2012.

Following the direction of the French National Police, he is made "Délégué interministeriel à la sécurité routière" (Road traffic safety) on 30 May 2012.

Péchenard teaches at the Ecole Nationale Supérieure de la Police, and gives occasional lectures at the Institute of Criminology of Panthéon-Assas University

== Works ==
- Piège pour une flic, Frédéric Péchenard and Luc Jacob-Duvernet, Anne Carrière, 2003
- Gardien de la Paix, Frédéric Péchenard, Michel Lafon, September 2007

== Honours ==
- Legion of Honour
