= Jacques Martial =

French actor and politician (1955–2025)

Jacques Martial (French: [ʒak maʁsjal]; 7 November 1955 – August 2025) was a French actor, stage director and politician.

== Life and career ==
Martial was born in Saint-Mandé, Île-de-France, on 7 November 1955, to Guadeloupean parents. His brother, Jean-Michel Martial, was an actor and director.

From 2006 to 2015, he was president of the Établissement public du parc et de la grande halle de la Villette, then president of the ACTe Memorial from 15 June 2015. In July 2020, he was elected Paris councillor, delegate in charge of the Overseas Territories. In November 2022, he was elected deputy mayor of Paris in charge of the Overseas Territories.

Between 1981 and 2023, Martial acted in a number of feature films, including Noir et Blanc (1986), Street of No Return (1989) and Omnibus (1992). He was also the French dubbing actor for actors including Denzel Washington, Wesley Snipes, Ving Rhames, Laurence Fishburne and Samuel L. Jackson.

Martial died on the night of 12 to 13 August 2025, at the age of 69. He had been married to Tim Greacen since 2015.
