= Julien Bargeton =

French politician (born 1973)

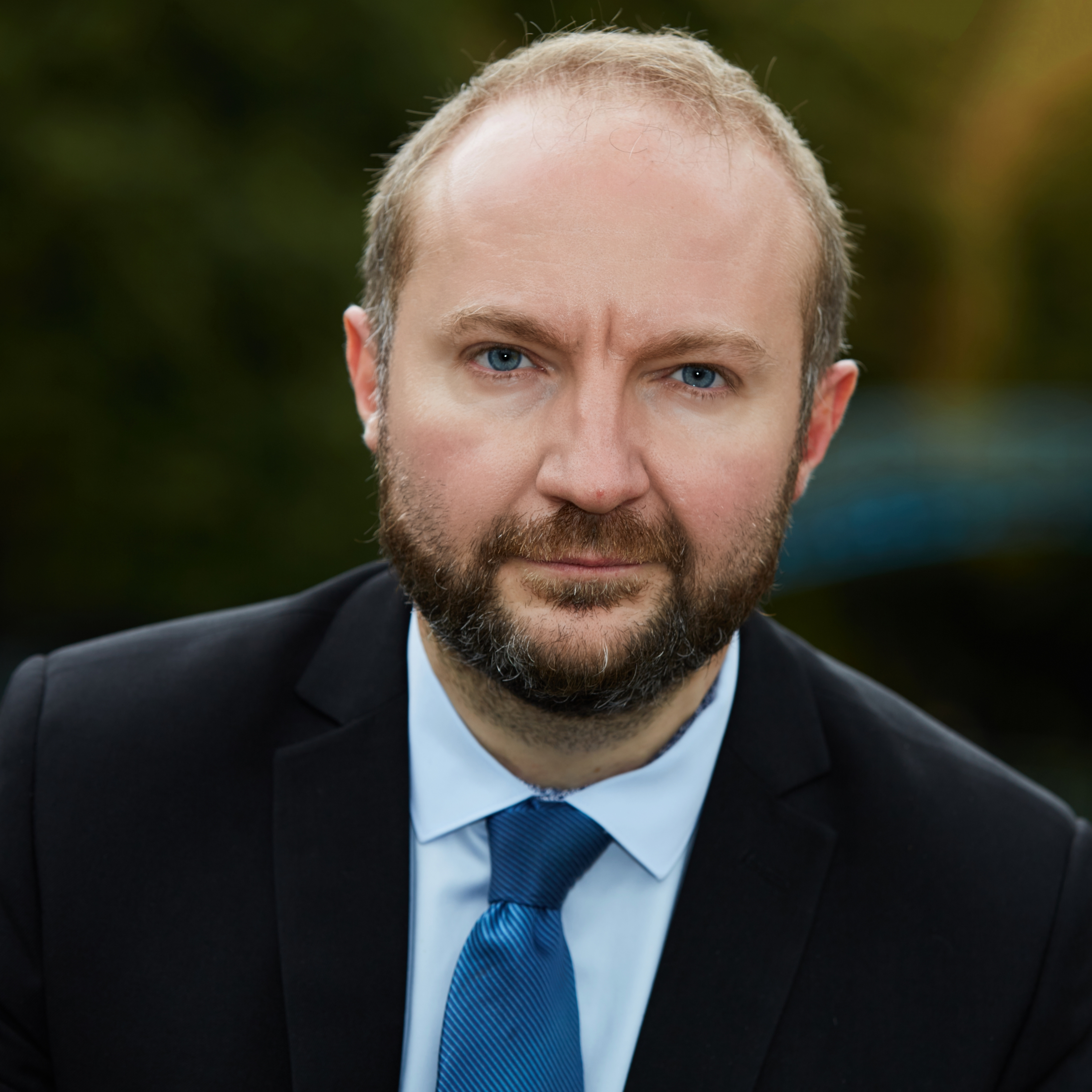

Senator for Paris
- In office 1 October 2017 – 1 October 2023

Member of the Regional Council of Île-de-France
- Incumbent
- Assumed office 1 July 2021

Councillor of Paris
- In office 21 March 2008 – 28 June 2020
- Constituency: 20th arrondissement

Personal details
- Born: 29 March 1973 (age 53) Paris, France
- Party: Socialist Party (until 2017); Renaissance (2017–present)
- Education: Sciences Po; ESSEC Business School; École nationale d'administration
- Profession: Civil servant

Julien Bargeton (French pronunciation: [ʒyljɛ̃ baʁʒ(ə)tɔ̃]; born 29 March 1973) is a French politician who served as a Senator for Paris from 2017 to 2023. A former member of the Socialist Party (PS), which he left in 2017 to join La République En Marche! (LREM, later Renaissance), he previously served as Deputy Mayor of Paris for Transport (2012–2014) under Bertrand Delanoë and for Finance (2014–2017) under Anne Hidalgo. Since 2024, he has presided over the Cité de l'Architecture et du Patrimoine.

== Career ==
A 2000 graduate of the École nationale d'administration, Bargeton joined the Court of Audit as a financial magistrate prior to his involvement in politics.

On 29 March 2008, shortly after his election to the Council of Paris for the Socialist Party, he assumed the first deputy mayorship of the 20th arrondissement, a position he held until 5 April 2014. On 9 July 2012, he was named Deputy Mayor of Paris for Transport by Mayor Bertrand Delanoë, succeeding Annick Lepetit. On 5 April 2014, he was named Deputy Mayor of Paris for Finance by newly-elected Mayor Anne Hidalgo, a position he held until his resignation on 6 October 2017 following him taking a seat in the Senate, to which he was elected for La République En Marche!, which he had joined that year. The list he headed placed third, with 11.3% of the vote.

Bargeton subsequently returned to the Council of Paris as president of a new group for La République En Marche!, Democrats and Progressists, on 20 November 2017. Elected to the Regional Council of Île-de-France in 2021, he left the Council of Paris on 28 June 2020 following the 2020 municipal election.

In 2023, he lost his Senate seat, as the list he led placed fourth with 6% of the vote. In 2024, he was appointed by President Emmanuel Macron to preside over the Cité de l'Architecture et du Patrimoine, an établissement public à caractère industriel et commercial under the Ministry of Culture.
