= Anne Souyris =

French politician (born 1964)

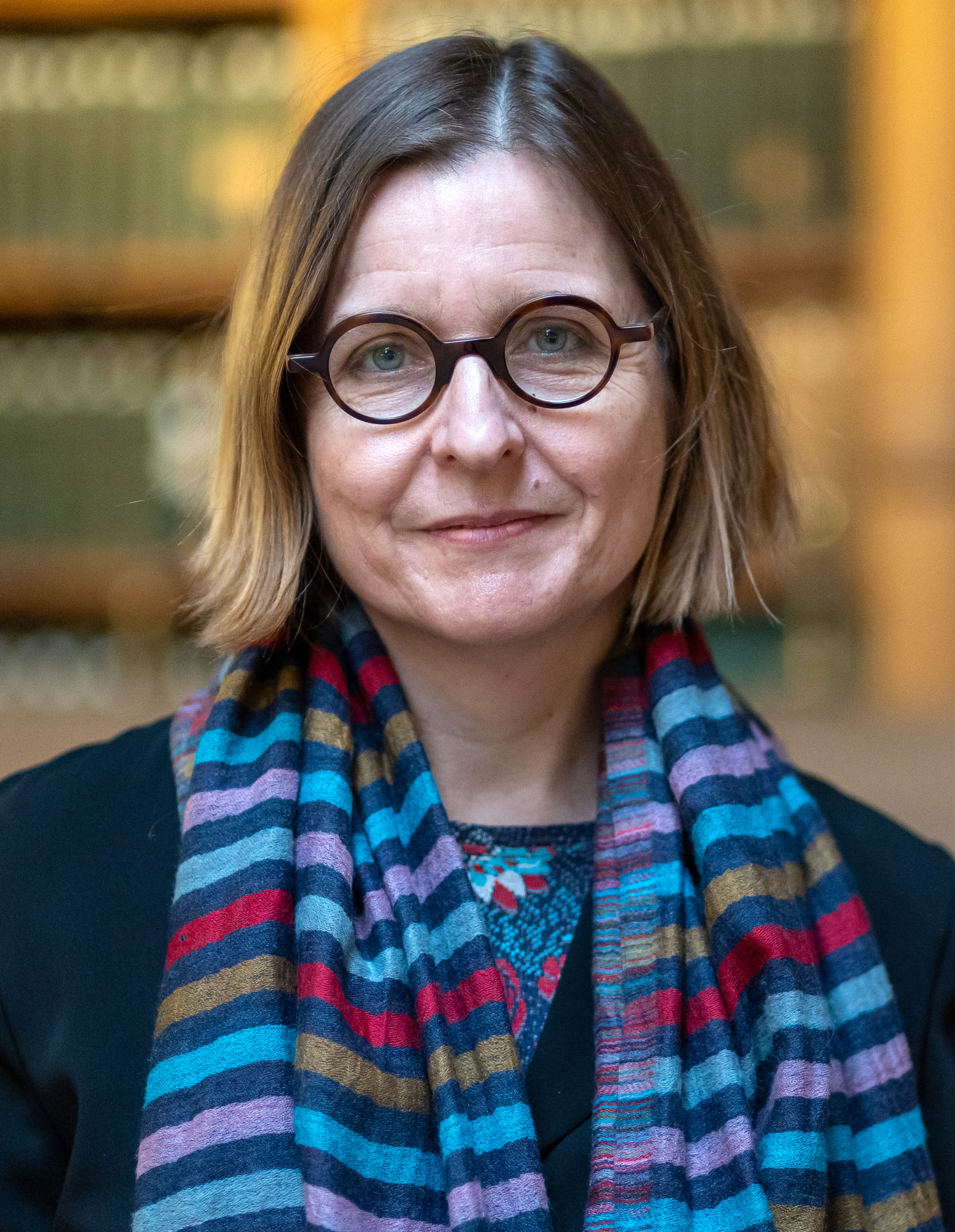
- Souyris in 2020

Member of the Senate
- Incumbent
- Assumed office 2 October 2023
- Constituency: Paris

Personal details
- Born: 29 August 1964 (age 61)
- Party: The Ecologists

Anne Souyris (born 29 August 1964) is a French politician of The Ecologists. Since 2023, she has been a member of the Senate. She has been a member of the Council of Paris since 2014, and served as a deputy mayor of Paris from 2017 to 2023. From 2004 to 2010, she served as national spokesperson of The Ecologists and as a regional councillor of Île-de-France. In the 2012 legislative election, she was a candidate for Paris's 5th constituency.
