= François Vauglin =

French politician (born 1969)

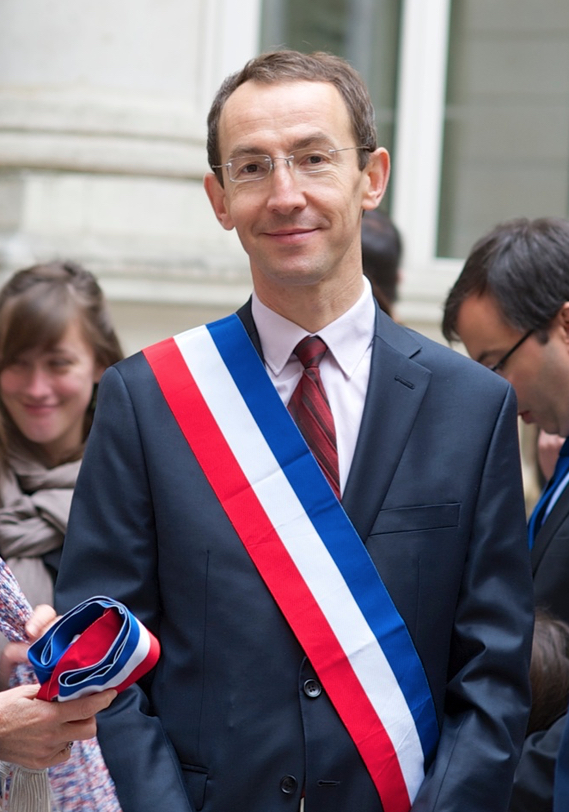
- Vauglin in 2014

Mayor of the 11th arrondissement of Paris
- In office 13 April 2014 – 6 April 2026
- Preceded by: Patrick Bloche
- Succeeded by: David Belliard

Personal details
- Born: 22 December 1969 (age 56)
- Party: Socialist Party

François Vauglin (born 22 December 1969) is a French politician of the Socialist Party. Since 2014, he has served as mayor of the 11th arrondissement of Paris. As mayor, he oversaw the Charlie Hebdo shooting, part of the November 2015 Paris attacks, the murder of Mireille Knoll and the killing of Sarah Halimi, which occurred in the arrondissement. He served as president of Homosexualités et Socialisme from 1997 to 2002, and has been a member of the Council of Paris since 2008.
