= Yves Pozzo di Borgo =

French politician

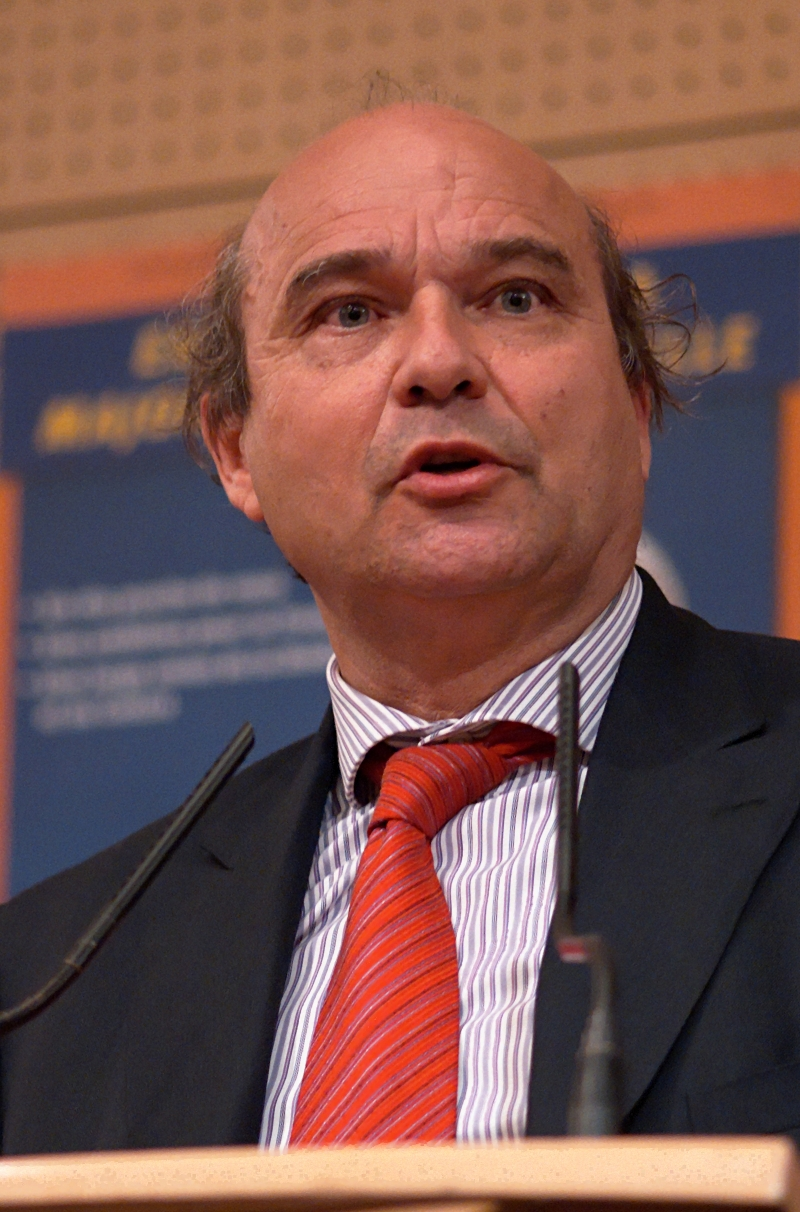

Member of the Council of Paris
- Incumbent
- Assumed office 18 March 2001
- Mayor: Bertrand Delanoë; Anne Hidalgo

Member of the French Senate for Paris
- In office 2004–2017

Personal details
- Born: 3 May 1948 (age 77) Ajaccio, France
- Party: UDI

Yves Pozzo di Borgo (born 3 May 1948) is a French politician, born in Ajaccio, Corsica. He was a member of the Senate of France from 2004 to 2017, representing the city of Paris for the Centrist Union.

== Political career ==
In parliament, Pozzo di Borgo was the deputy chairman of the Committee on European Affairs. He also served on the Committee on Foreign Affairs and on the Defence Committee.

In addition to his committee assignments, Pozzo di Borgo was the president of the Parliamentary Friendship Group with Central Asia (Kazakhstan, Kyrgyzstan, Uzbekistan, Tajikistan, Turkmenistan) and a member of the French delegation to the Parliamentary Assembly of the Organization for Security and Co-operation in Europe.

Pozzo di Borgo publicly endorsed François Bayrou in the 2012 presidential elections.

From 2004 until 2017, Pozzo di Borgo also served as member of the French delegation to the Parliamentary Assembly of the Council of Europe. In this capacity, he was a member of the Committee on Political Affairs and Democracy; the Committee on Rules of Procedure, Immunities and Institutional Affairs; and the Sub-Committee on Crime Problems and the Fight against Terrorism. He had previously been the Assembly's rapporteur on the European Court of Human Rights (2015) and on the protection of human rights defenders (2017).

In July 2015, Pozzo di Borgo accompanied Thierry Mariani and 10 other party members on a controversial visit to the recently annexed Crimea.

In 2016, Pozzo di Borgo publicly endorsed Nathalie Kosciusko-Morizet in the Republicans' primaries for the 2017 presidential elections.

== Other activities ==
- Association Dialogue Franco-Russe, Member of the Bureau
- Institut Jean Lecanuet, President

== Links ==
- Page on the Senate website
