= Catherine Dumas =

French politician (born 1957)

Senator for Paris
- Incumbent
- Assumed office 2 October 2017
- In office 30 November 2007 – 30 September 2011

Member of the Regional Council of Île-de-France
- In office 18 December 2015 – 2 November 2017

Councillor of Paris
- Incumbent
- Assumed office 23 March 2001
- Constituency: 17th arrondissement

Personal details
- Born: 13 July 1957 (age 68)
- Party: Rally for the Republic (until 2002); Union for a Popular Movement (2002–2015); The Republicans (2015–present)

Catherine Dumas (born 13 July 1957) is a French politician who has represented Paris in the Senate since 2017, previously holding a seat from 2007 to 2011. A member of The Republicans (LR), she has also been a Councillor of Paris since 2001.

Dumas entered the Senate in 2007 following the resignation of Philippe Goujon, who had been elected to the National Assembly. She was elected a Senator in her own right in 2017 and reelected in 2023.

On 30 January 2024, following the appointment of Rachida Dati as Minister of Culture, she became president of the 'Changer Paris' group in the Council of Paris with 42 votes for and 9 blank or invalid votes.
