= Paris Centre =

Administrative division of Paris

Paris Centre Paris Centre (French)
- Sector (administrative and electoral division) of Paris
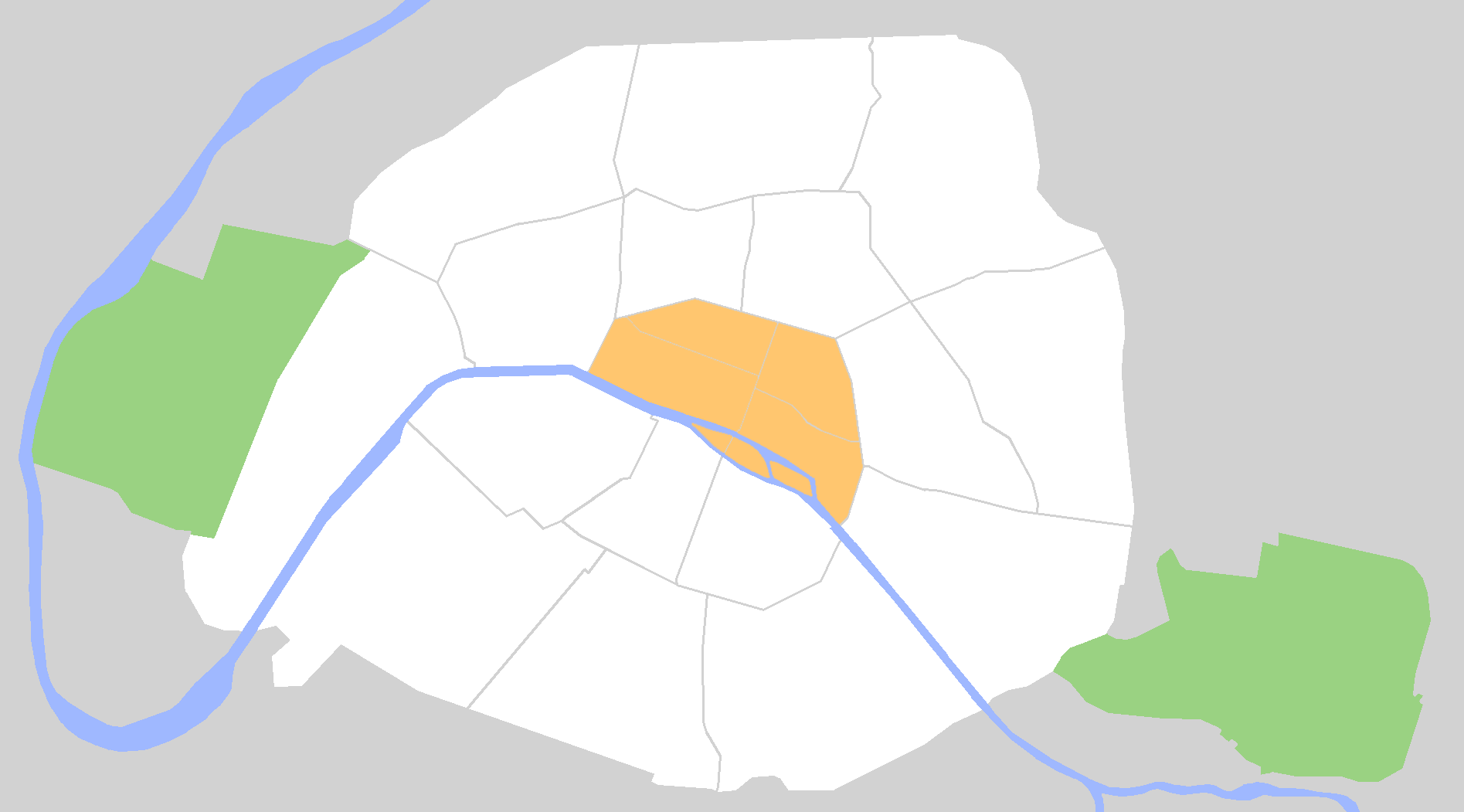
- Location of Paris Centre in Paris
- Country: France
- Region: Île-de-France
- City: Paris
- Arrondissements: 1st, 2nd, 3rd, 4th

Government
  - Mayor: Ariel Weil

Area
  - Total: 5.59 km^{2} (2.16 sq mi)

Population (2017)
  - Total: 100,196

Logo of Paris Centre town hall

Paris Centre (French: [paʁi sɑ̃tʁ]), officially the 1st sector of Paris (1er secteur de Paris), is an administrative division of Paris encompassing the 1st, 2nd, 3rd and 4th arrondissements of the city. Historically, the boundary of these arrondissements roughly followed the line of the former city walls of Charles V and Louis XIII.

== History ==
=== 1975–1982: Electoral sectors ===
In 1975, the arrondissements of Paris (as well as Lyon and Marseille) were used to define electoral sectors for municipal elections. Until 1982 (before the PLM law), Paris had 18 sectors for 20 arrondissements; two sectors already paired arrondissements:

- the 1st and 4th arrondissements (4 seats on the Council of Paris);
- the 2nd and 3rd arrondissements (4 seats on the Council of Paris).

=== 2016–2017: Merger proposal and law ===
In August 2016, ministers Jean-Michel Baylet, Bernard Cazeneuve and Estelle Grelier proposed reforms to the territorial division of Paris. The law was passed by the Senate in November and the National Assembly in February 2017, and promulgated on 28 February 2017.

The reform did not abolish the first four arrondissements, but grouped them into a single administrative and electoral sector with one arrondissement council and one arrondissement mayor shared across the four, similar to the sector system in Marseille. This was done as demographic changes had meant that the first four arrondissements were overrepresented on the Council of Paris by over 20% in terms of population per seat, and the reform aimed to rebalance representation. The new entity had 101,764 inhabitants and eight seats, making it one seat per 12,720 inhabitants, 7% underrepresentation.

The overall number of seats on the Council of Paris remained unchanged; Paris was reorganized into 17 sectors superimposed on the existing 20 arrondissements, and sector numbering skips from 1 to 5.

=== 2018: Vote on the town hall site and sector name ===
In October 2018, residents were consulted (in person or by post, 8–14 October 2018) to choose both:

- the location of the merged town hall (between the former 3rd and 4th arrondissement town halls, with the other two being too small to be proposed); and
- the name of the new sector, among Paris Centre, Cœur de Paris (Heart of Paris), Premiers arrondissements de Paris (First arrondissements of Paris), and Paris 1 2 3 4.

The name Paris Centre received 56.7% of the vote (followed by Cœur de Paris at 31.8%, Paris 1234 at 9%, and Premiers arrondissements de Paris at 2.5%). The 3rd arrondissement town hall was chosen as the seat of the new municipal hall, receiving 50.7% of the vote.

=== 2020: Implementation ===
The reform was implemented from the day after the second round of the 2020 municipal elections. Paris Centre was first involved in municipal elections in 2020. Ariel Weil of the Socialist Party (PS) was elected mayor, having been the last mayor of the 4th arrondissement.

== Politics ==
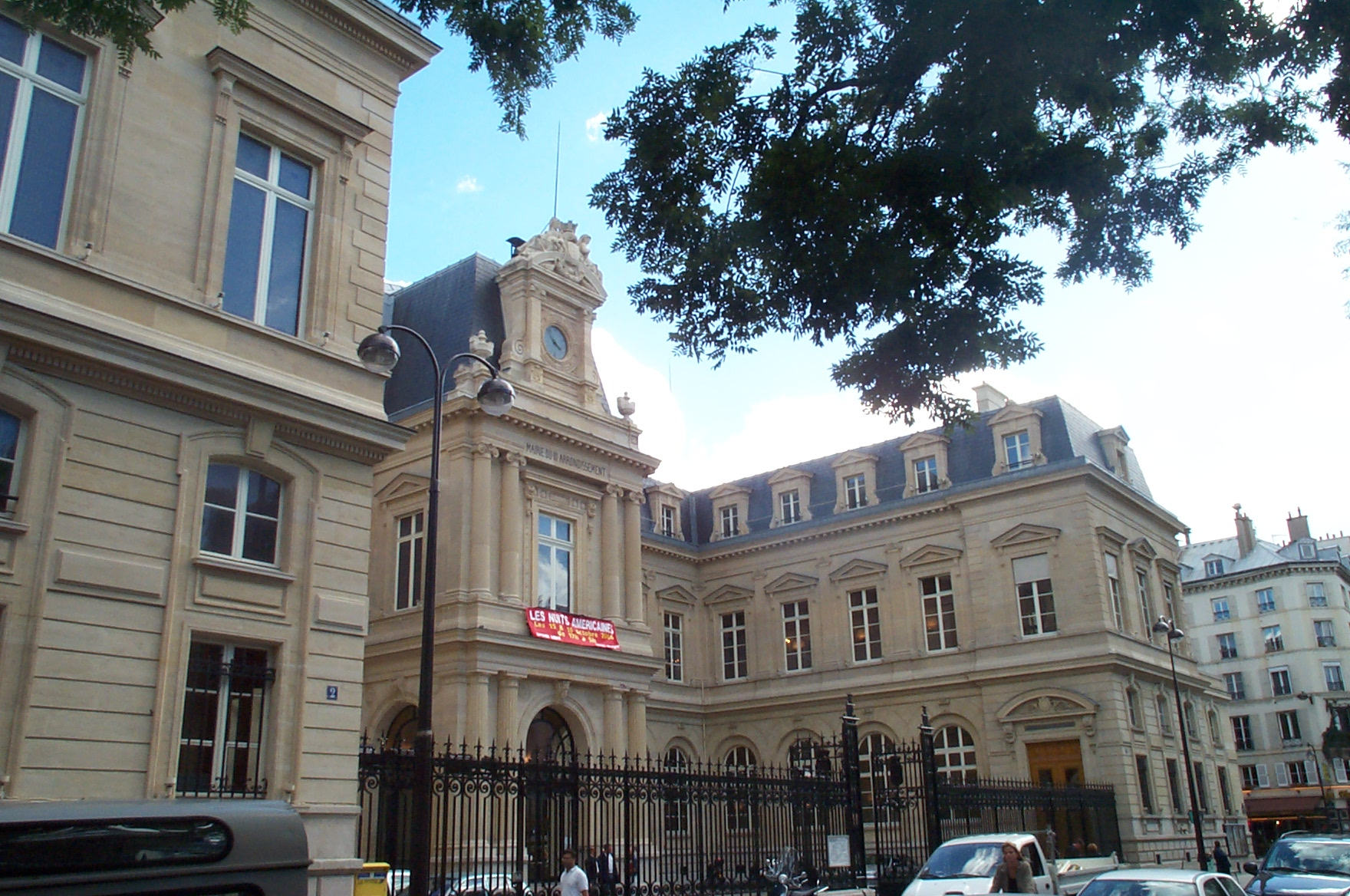
The Mairie (Mayor's Office) of Paris Centre (former Mairie of the 3rd arrondissement)

The arrondissement council of Paris Centre has 24 members, eight of whom also sit on the Council of Paris.

=== Mayors ===
Mayors of Paris Centre (1st sector)
Election	Mayor	Party
2020	Ariel Weil	PS

== See also ==
- Arrondissements of Paris#History
- Council of Paris
