= Soyons libres =

Let's Be Free Soyons Libres
- President: Valérie Pécresse
- Chairperson: Éric Pauget
- Founder: Valérie Pécresse
- Founded: 10 September 2017
- Split from: The Republicans
- Headquarters: Paris
- Ideology: Liberal conservatism; Neo-Gaullism; Economic liberalism; Pro-Europeanism
- Political position: Centre-right
- National affiliation: The Republicans; Union of the Right and Centre (2017-2019, since 2021)
- Colours: Blue
- National Assembly: 1 / 577
- Senate: 2 / 348

Website
- www.soyonslibres.fr

Soyons Libres (French pronunciation: [swajɔ̃ libʁ], SL, English: Let's be free), also called simply Libres, is a French political party that was founded in 2017 by Valérie Pécresse, within The Republicans.

== History ==
An offshoot of Changer c'est possible (2008) and Action Île-de-France (2011), Soyons libres was created on September 10, 2017 by Valérie Pécresse. The media launch took place at a meeting attended by some 2,000 people in Argenteuil in October 2017. Soyons libres was recognized as a movement associated with LR by Laurent Wauquiez in January 2018, at an LR national council meeting [ref. needed].

With Soyons libres, Valérie Pécresse positioned herself as an opponent of Laurent Wauquiez within LR. A proponent of a more liberal, centre-right and Europhile line, she denounced the party's shrinking electoral base and the existence of "two rightists that need to be reconciled" within the party. Her initiative aimed to unite all the way to the centre and tackle new themes such as ecology and digital.

In 2018, Pécresse supported the Philippe government on the law on student orientation and success and SNCF reform. However, she believed that the government is not going far enough with its reforms and declares her opposition to a rapprochement of the right and centre in both La République En Marche ! (LREM) and Rassemblement National (RN): she wanted to create a "third way", as advocated by Gérard Larcher's initiative following the 2019 European elections.

Pécresse left Les Républicains on June 5, 2019, following the poor score obtained by the Les Républicains-Les Centristes list in the European elections and before the holding of an election for the party presidency for which she was given as a possible candidate. She cited the impossibility of forming a broader political organization, claiming that "the party is locked from the inside, in its organization and in its ideas". In her wake, several people close to her left the party, including Robin Reda and Florence Portelli. She is additionally joined by Thierry Meignen.

== Politicians ==
- Florence Berthout
- Jean-Carles Grelier
- Patrick Karam
- Frédérique Meunier
- Éric Pauget
- Florence Portelli
- Robin Reda
- Thierry Meignen
