= Ariel Weil =

Mayor of 4th arrondissement of Paris

Ariel Edmond Nicolas Weil
- אריאל אדמונד ניקולאס ווייל

Mayor of Paris Centre
- Incumbent
- Assumed office 11 July 2020

Mayor of the 4th arrondissement of Paris
- In office 23 November 2017 – 11 July 2020
- Preceded by: Christophe Girard

Personal details
- Born: 5 June 1973 (age 53) Jerusalem, Israel
- Party: Socialist
- Spouse: Delphine Horvilleur
- Education: Lycée Henri-IV
- Alma mater: ENSAE ParisTech; Sciences Po; Harvard Business School

Ariel Edmond Nicolas Weil (Hebrew: אריאל אדמונד ניקולאס ווייל; born 1973 in Jerusalem) is an Israeli-born French economist and politician who has been the Socialist Party mayor of Paris Centre (the central Paris area composed of arrondissements 1, 2, 3 and 4) since 2020.

Prior to his election as mayor of Paris Centre, he had served as a borough councillor of 4th arrondissement of Paris from 2014 to 2020, and as mayor of the 4th arrondissement from 2017 to 2020.

Weil graduated from Sciences Po and Harvard Business School and was the husband of rabbi Delphine Horvilleur.
