= Colombe Brossel =

French politician (born 1976)

Member of the Senate
- Incumbent
- Assumed office 2 October 2023
- Constituency: Paris

Personal details
- Born: 19 April 1976 (age 50)
- Party: Socialist Party
- Education: Paris 1 Panthéon-Sorbonne University

Colombe Brossel (born 19 April 1976) is a French politician of the Socialist Party (PS) who has been a member of the Senate since the 2023 elections.

== Political career ==
Brossel has been a member of the Council of Paris since 2001. She served as a deputy mayor of Paris under successive mayors Bertrand Delanoë (2008–2014) and Anne Hidalgo (2014–2023), in charge of security issues.

In the 2017 legislative election, Brossel was a candidate for Paris's 17th constituency.

In the Senate, Brossel has been serving on the Committee on Culture, Education, Communication and Sport. Since 2026, she has been leading an investigative commission to probe French billionaire Pierre-Édouard Stérin's Périclès group and similar private endeavors.
