= 2014 Paris municipal election =

Local election in France

- 23 March 2014 (first round); 30 March 2014 (second round)

All 163 members of the Council of Paris 82 seats needed for a majority
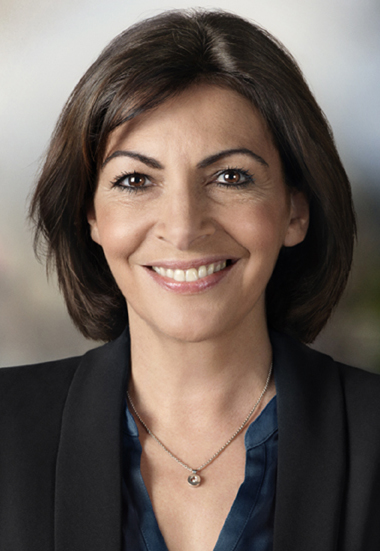

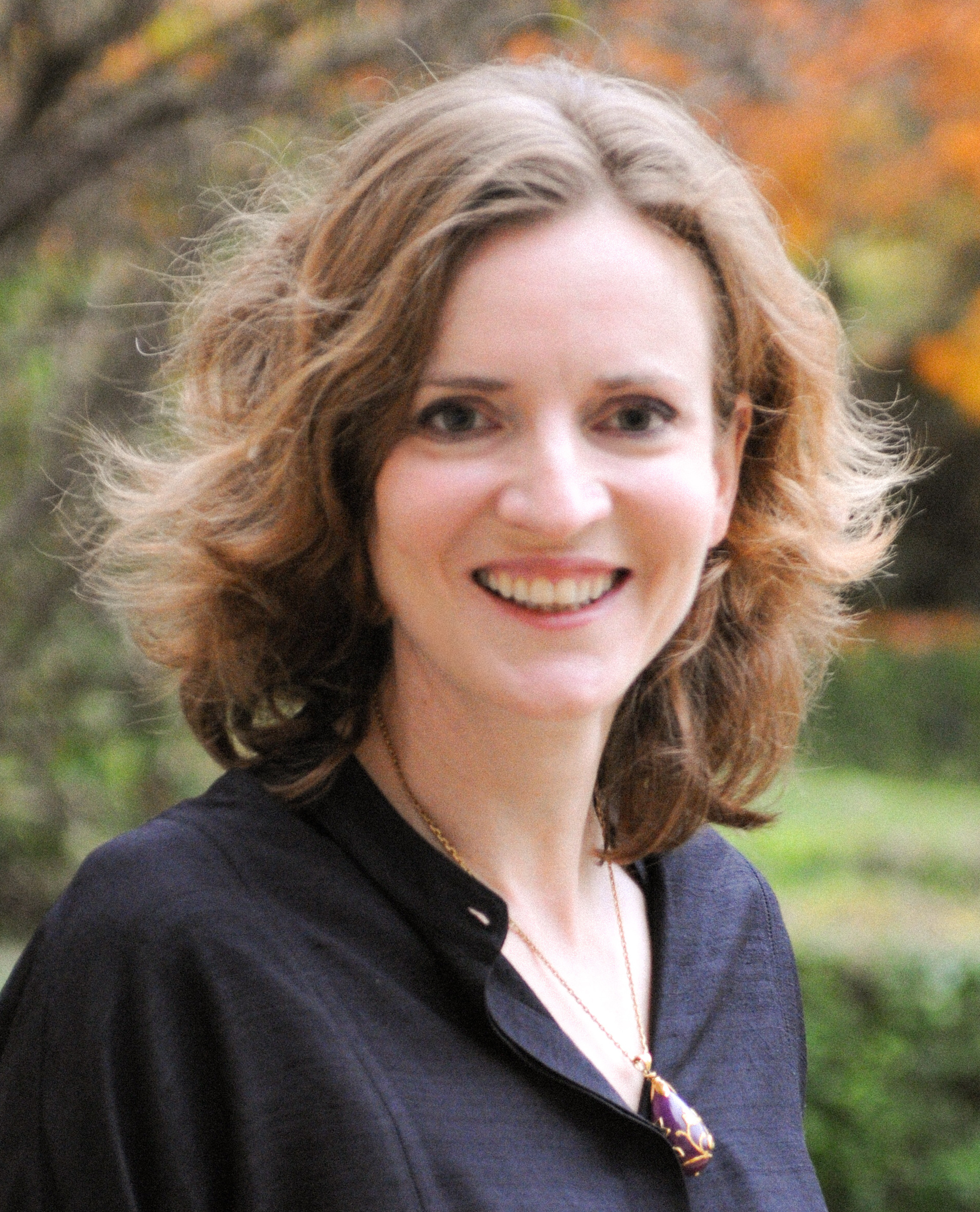

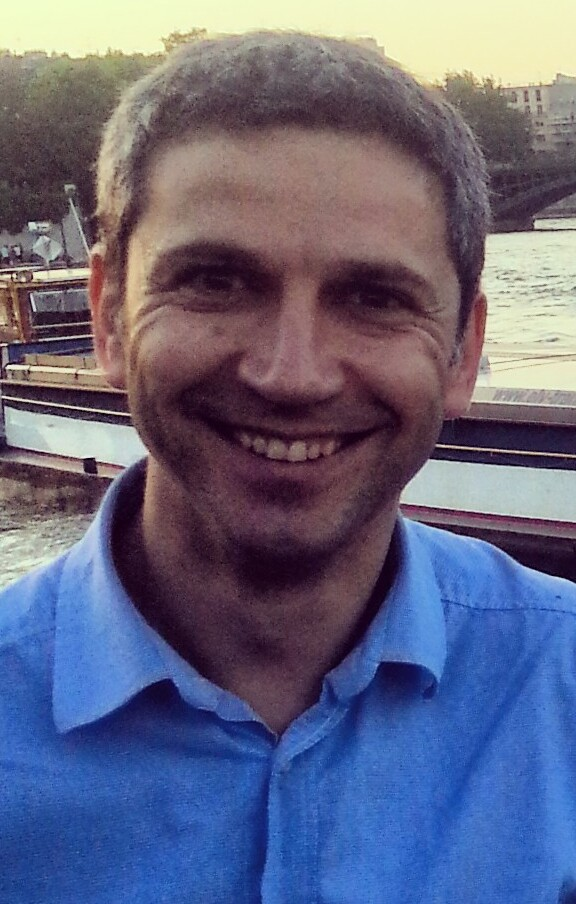
	First party	Second party	Third party
Leader	Anne Hidalgo	Nathalie Kosciusko-Morizet	Christophe Najdovski
Party	PS	UMP	EELV
Leader's seat	15th Arrondissement	14th Arrondissement	12th Arrondissement
Last election	57.71%, 86 seats	36.07%, 61 seats	6.78%, 11 seats
Seats won	75	71	16
Seat change	▼11	▲9	▲5
Popular vote	305,681	252,512	60,234
Percentage	53.33%	44.06%	8.86%
- Results of arrondissement mayoral elections
Mayor before election
Bertrand Delanoë
PS
Mayor-Elect
Anne Hidalgo
PS

The 2014 Paris municipal elections took place on 23 and 30 March 2014, at the same time as other French municipal elections.

Anne Hidalgo of the Socialist Party was elected mayor of Paris, becoming the first woman to hold the position. She had been the city's deputy mayor.

Hidalgo won with around 55% of the vote in the second round. Her principal opponent was Nathalie Kosciusko-Morizet of the UMP who had finished ahead of Hidalgo in first round of voting on 23 March. Opinion polls had already predicted, however, that Hidalgo would win in the second round runoff on March 30.

The outgoing mayor was the Socialists' Bertrand Delanoë, who did not run for a third term.

Control of Paris' twenty arrondissements was also decided in the elections. Ten were won by the Socialist Party, nine by the UMP and one by EELV.

== Detailed results ==
2014 Parisian municipal election
Party or parties	Lead candidate	First round		Second round		Seats
Party or parties	Lead candidate	Votes	%	Votes	%	Seats
PS - PCF - PRG - GU - R&S	Anne Hidalgo	233,808	34.4%	305,681	53.33%	75
UMP - UDI - MoDem	Nathalie Kosciusko-Morizet	252,512	35.91%	159,059	44.06%	71
Europe Écologie Les Verts	Christophe Najdovski	60,234	8.86%			16
PG - Ensemble - PCOF	Danielle Simonnet	33,607	4.94%	7,732	1.35%	1
Rassemblement National	Wallerand de Saint-Just	42,560	6.26%			
Total

== See also ==
- List of Paris' councillors (2014-2020)
