= Arrondissements of Paris =

Administrative districts of the French capital

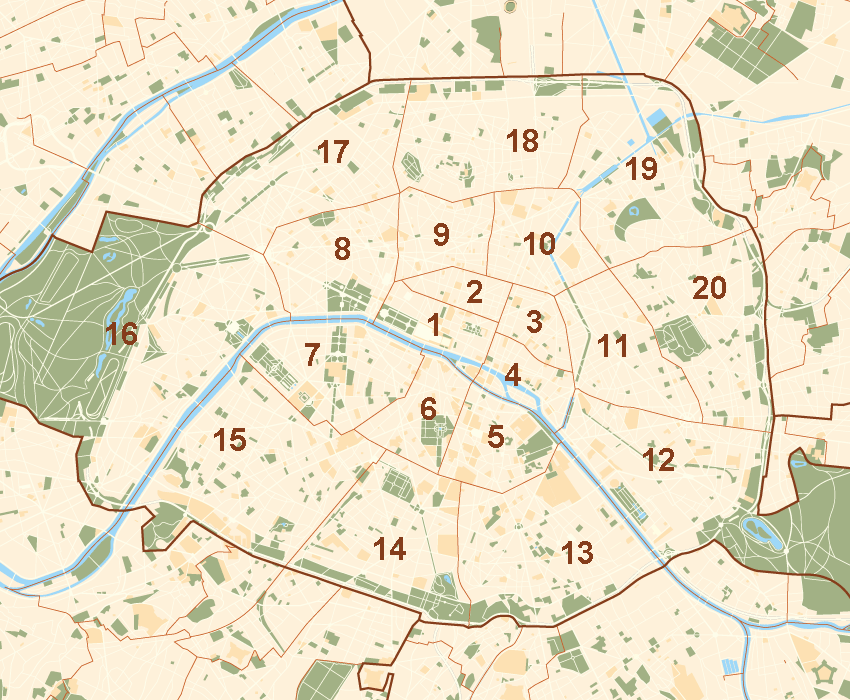
- Country: France
- Region: Île-de-France
- Department: Paris
- Cantons: 20
- Communes: 1
- Prefecture: Paris

Area ¹
  - Total: 105 km^{2} (41 sq mi)

Population (2009)
  - Total: 2,234,105
  - Density: 21,300/km^{2} (55,100/sq mi)
- ¹ French Land Registry data, which exclude lakes, ponds, and glaciers larger than 1 km², as well as the estuaries of rivers.

The City of Paris is divided into twenty arrondissements municipaux, administrative districts, referred to as arrondissements (French: [aʁɔ̃dismɑ̃]). These are not to be confused with departmental arrondissements, which subdivide the larger French departments.

The number of the arrondissement is indicated by the last two digits in most Parisian postal codes, 75001 up to 75020. In addition to their number, each arrondissement has a name, often for a local monument. For example, the 5th arrondissement is also called "Panthéon" in reference to the eponymous building. The first four arrondissements have a shared administration, called Paris Centre.

== Description ==
The twenty arrondissements (French: "rounding") are arranged in the form of a clockwise spiral, often likened to a snail shell, starting from the middle of the city, with the first on the Right Bank (north bank) of the Seine.

In French, notably on street signs, the number is often given in Roman numerals. For example, the Eiffel Tower belongs to the VII^{e} arrondissement, while Gare de l'Est is in the X^{e} arrondissement. In daily speech, people use the ordinal number corresponding to the arrondissement, e.g. "Elle habite dans le sixième", "She lives in the 6th (arrondissement)".

Due to suburbanization, the population of Paris has gradually shifted outward, with only two arrondissements still growing.

== Governance ==
Uniquely among French cities, Paris is both a municipality (commune) and a department (département). Under the PLM Law (Loi PLM) of 1982, which redefined the governance of Paris, Lyon, and Marseille, hence the PLM acronym, there are both a city council called the Council of Paris, and 20 arrondissement councils in Paris. The PLM Law set limits to the prerogatives of the mayor of Paris, who has to deal with the powers granted to the prefect of police on security issues.

The 20 arrondissement councils (conseils d'arrondissement) are similar in operation to a municipal council (conseil municipal), but with very few powers. Its members are elected at municipal elections in the same way as in municipalities with more than 3,500 inhabitants. Two-thirds of each arrondissement council is made up of members elected specifically as arrondissement councillors. The remaining third are Council of Paris members representing the arrondissement, sitting ex officio.

For example, the council of the 19th arrondissement has 42 members. 28 are conseillers d'arrondissement who only sit on the arrondissement council. 14 are conseillers de Paris who also sit on the city council. At its first meeting after the elections, each arrondissement council elects its mayor.

Each arrondissement is subdivided administratively into four quartiers. Paris thus has 80 quartiers administratifs, each containing a police station. For a table giving the names of the eighty quartiers, see Quarters of Paris.

== Arrondissements ==
Coat of arms	Arrondissement (R for Right Bank, L for Left Bank)	Name	Area (km^{2})	Population (2017 estimate)	Density (2017) (inhabitants per km^{2})	Peak of population	Mayor (2020–2026)
Coat of arms of 1st arrondissement of Paris	1st (I^{er}) R Administratively part of Paris Centre	Louvre	5.59 km^{2} (2.16 sq mi)	100,196 (Paris Centre)	17,924 (Paris Center)	before 1861	Ariel Weil (PS)
Coat of arms of 2nd arrondissement of Paris	2nd (II^{e}) R Administratively part of Paris Centre	Bourse	5.59 km^{2} (2.16 sq mi)	100,196 (Paris Centre)	17,924 (Paris Center)	before 1861	Ariel Weil (PS)
Coat of arms of 3rd arrondissement of Paris	3rd (III^{e}) R Administratively part of Paris Centre	Temple	5.59 km^{2} (2.16 sq mi)	100,196 (Paris Centre)	17,924 (Paris Center)	before 1861	Ariel Weil (PS)
Coat of arms of 4th arrondissement of Paris	4th (IV^{e}) R Administratively part of Paris Centre	Hôtel-de-Ville	5.59 km^{2} (2.16 sq mi)	100,196 (Paris Centre)	17,924 (Paris Center)	before 1861	Ariel Weil (PS)
Coat of arms of 5th arrondissement of Paris	5th (V^{e}) L	Panthéon	2.541 km^{2} (0.981 sq mi)	59,631	23,477	1911	Florence Berthout (DVD)
Coat of arms of 6th arrondissement of Paris	6th (VI^{e}) L	Luxembourg	2.154 km^{2} (0.832 sq mi)	41,976	19,524	1911	Jean-Pierre Lecoq (LR)
Coat of arms of 7th arrondissement of Paris	7th (VII^{e}) L	Palais-Bourbon	4.088 km^{2} (1.578 sq mi)	52,193	12,761	1926	Rachida Dati (LR)
Coat of arms of 8th arrondissement of Paris	8th (VIII^{e}) R	Élysée	3.881 km^{2} (1.498 sq mi)	37,368	9,631	1891	Jeanne d'Hauteserre (LR)
Coat of arms of 9th arrondissement of Paris	9th (IX^{e}) R	Opéra	2.179 km^{2} (0.841 sq mi)	60,071	27,556	1901	Delphine Bürkli (DVD)
Coat of arms of 10th arrondissement of Paris	10th (X^{e}) R	Entrepôt	2.892 km^{2} (1.117 sq mi)	90,836	31,431	1881	Alexandra Cordebard (PS)
Coat of arms of 11th arrondissement of Paris	11th (XI^{e}) R	Popincourt	3.666 km^{2} (1.415 sq mi)	147,470	40,183	1911	François Vauglin (PS)
Coat of arms of 12th arrondissement of Paris	12th (XII^{e}) R	Reuilly	16.324 km^{2} (6.303 sq mi) (Note: With the Bois de Vincennes); 6.377 km^{2} (2.462 sq mi) (Note: Without the Bois de Vincennes)	141,287	8,657; 21,729	1962	Emmanuelle Pierre-Marie (EELV)
Coat of arms of 13th arrondissement of Paris	13th (XIII^{e}) L	Gobelins	7.146 km^{2} (2.759 sq mi)	183,399	25,650	2005 (Note: 2005 is the year of the most recent official estimate; population of these arrondissements may still be growing.)	Jérôme Coumet (PS)
Coat of arms of 14th arrondissement of Paris	14th (XIV^{e}) L	Observatoire	5.621 km^{2} (2.170 sq mi)	136,941	24,280	1954	Carine Petit (Gt.s)
Coat of arms of 15th arrondissement of Paris	15th (XV^{e}) L	Vaugirard	8.502 km^{2} (3.283 sq mi)	235,178	27,733	1962	Philippe Goujon (LR)
Coat of arms of 16th arrondissement of Paris	16th (XVI^{e}) R	Passy	16.305 km^{2} (6.295 sq mi) (Note: With the Bois de Boulogne); 7.846 km^{2} (3.029 sq mi) (Note: Without the Bois de Boulogne)	149,500	9,169; 19,054	1962	Francis Szpiner (LR)
Coat of arms of 17th arrondissement of Paris	17th (XVII^{e}) R	Batignolles-Monceau	5.669 km^{2} (2.189 sq mi)	168,737	29,760	1954	Geoffroy Boulard (LR)
Coat of arms of 18th arrondissement of Paris	18th (XVIII^{e}) R	Butte-Montmartre	6.005 km^{2} (2.319 sq mi)	196,131	32,634	1931	Éric Lejoindre (PS)
Coat of arms of 19th arrondissement of Paris	19th (XIX^{e}) R	Buttes-Chaumont	6.786 km^{2} (2.620 sq mi)	188,066	27,697	2005	François Dagnaud (PS)
Coat of arms of 20th arrondissement of Paris	20th (XX^{e}) R	Ménilmontant	5.984 km^{2} (2.310 sq mi)	191,800	32,052	1936	Éric Pliez (DVG)

== History ==
A map showing the twelve original arrondissements in 1795. The surrounding grey area shows the size of Paris after the expansion in 1860.

On 11 October 1795, Paris was divided into twelve arrondissements. They were numbered from west to east. The numbers 1–9 were on the Right Bank of the Seine. The numbers were 10–12 on the Left Bank. Each arrondissement was subdivided into four quartiers, which corresponded to the 48 original districts created in 1790.

In the late 1850s, Emperor Napoleon III and the Prefect of the Seine Baron Haussmann developed a plan to incorporate several of the surrounding communes into the Paris jurisdiction. In 1859, Parliament passed the necessary legislation, and the expansion took effect when the law was promulgated on 3 November 1859. City taxes were extended to the new neighborhoods in July 1860.

The previous twelve arrondissements were done away with, and twenty new arrondissements were created. In historical records, when it is necessary to distinguish between the two systems, the original arrondissements are indicated by adding the term ancienne ("former" or "old"), for example, 2ème ancienne or 7ème anc.

Before the reorganization, non-married couples who lived together were said to have "married at the town hall of the 13th arrondissement" ("se marier à la mairie du 13e arrondissement"), as a jocular reference to there being no 13th. When Haussmann released his plan for the new boundaries and numbering system, residents of Passy objected because it placed them in the new 13th arrondissement. The mayor of Passy, Jean-Frédéric Possoz, devised the numbering of the arrondissements in a spiral pattern, beginning on the Right Bank, which put Passy in the 16th. This system turned the Louvre area, which contained the Tuileries Palace and other imperial palaces, into the 1st. The Gobelins area became the 13th instead.

In early 2016, mayor Anne Hidalgo proposed that the first four arrondissements should have their administrations merged. The Council of Paris approved this in February 2016. The four have a combined population of about 100,000, with the 1st, 2nd, 4th, and 3rd arrondissements in that order being the four smallest in Paris. In August 2016, the matter was taken up in the National Assembly, and approved in February 2017.

In October 2018, in a postal referendum, the town hall of the 3rd arrondissement was chosen to house the new shared administration. The name "Paris Centre" was chosen for the sector. In June 2020, the reform was implemented, the day after the second round of the 2020 Paris municipal election. The four arrondissements now share a mayor and a district council. The four arrondissements continue to exist, but are no longer used as administrative and electoral sectors.

== Logos of the town halls ==
Logos of the Paris town halls

Paris Centre, arrondissements 1, 2, 3, 4

5th arrondissement

6th arrondissement

7th arrondissement

8th arrondissement

9th arrondissement

10th arrondissement

11th arrondissement

12th arrondissement

13th arrondissement

14th arrondissement

15th arrondissement

16th arrondissement

17th arrondissement

18th arrondissement

19th arrondissement

20th arrondissement

== Works ==
- Paris, je t'aime, a 2006 film composed of five-minute sequences on each arrondissement

== See also ==
- Arrondissement, for other uses of the term.
- Historical quarters of Paris
- Administration of Paris

== Bibliography ==
- Carmona, Michel (2002). Haussmann: His Life and Times and the Making of Modern Paris. Chicago: Ivan R. Dee. p. 516. ISBN 9781566634274.
