= 2020 Paris municipal election =

Local election in France

- 15 March 2020 (first round); 28 June 2020 (second round)

All 163 members of the Council of Paris 82 seats needed for a majority
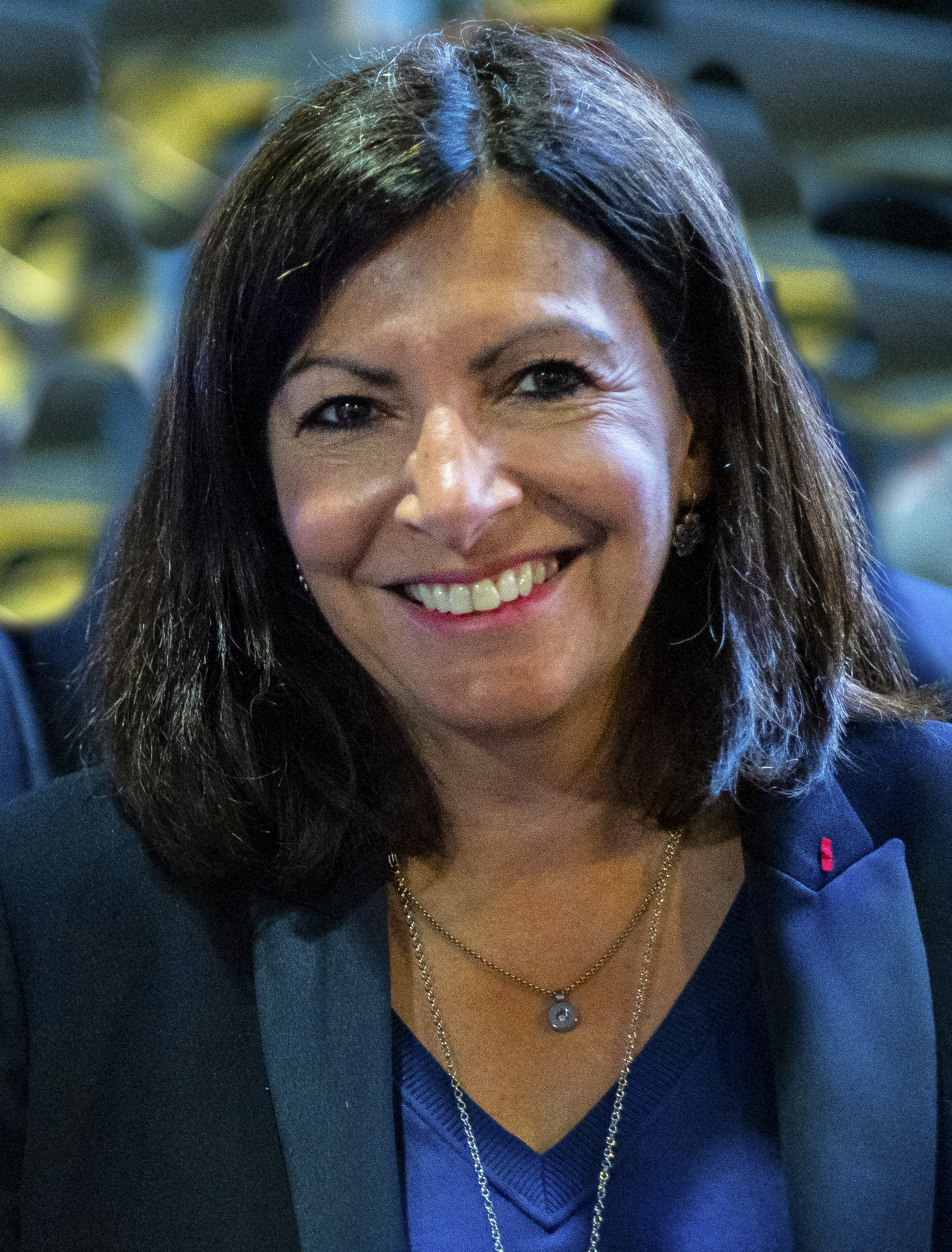

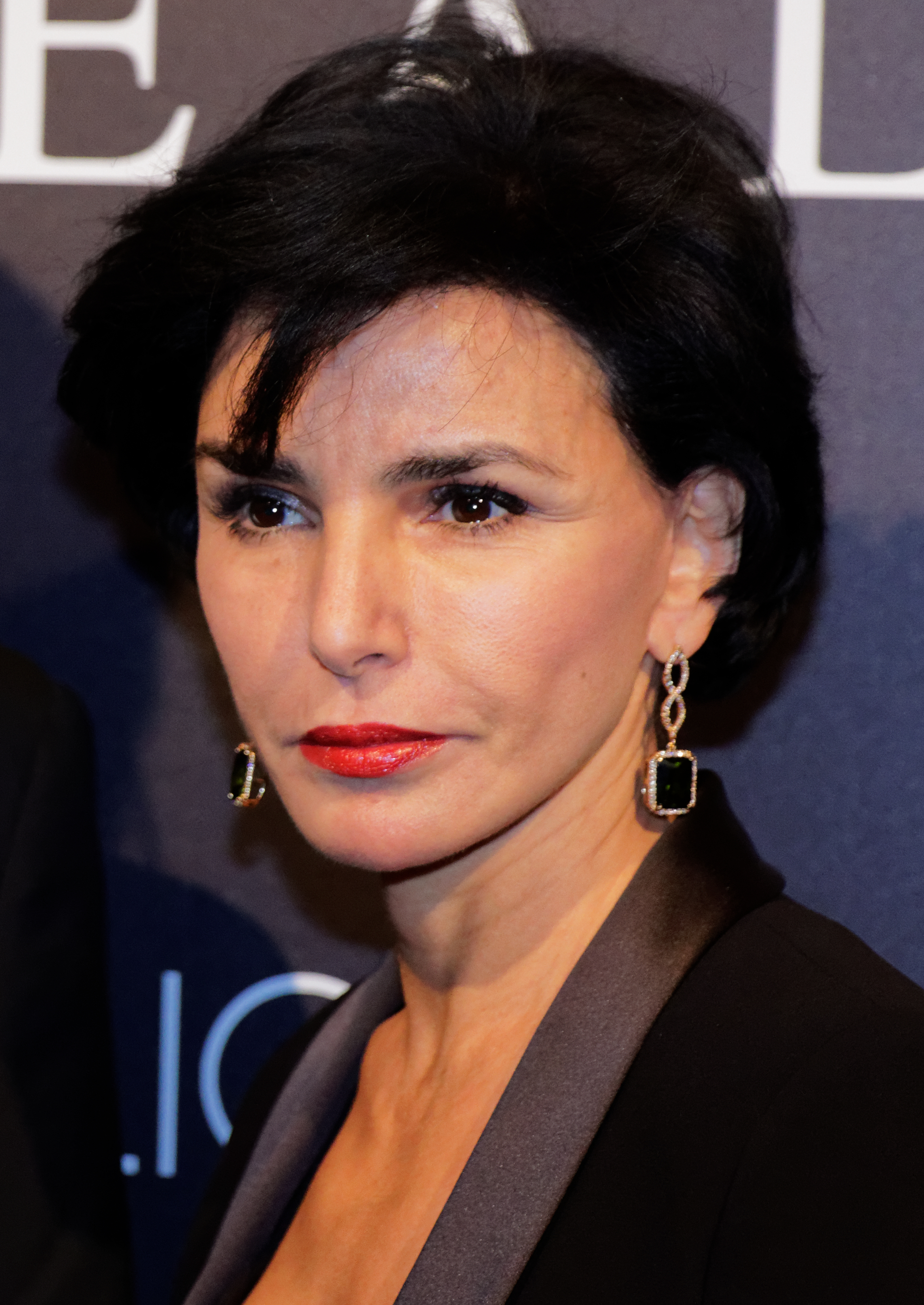

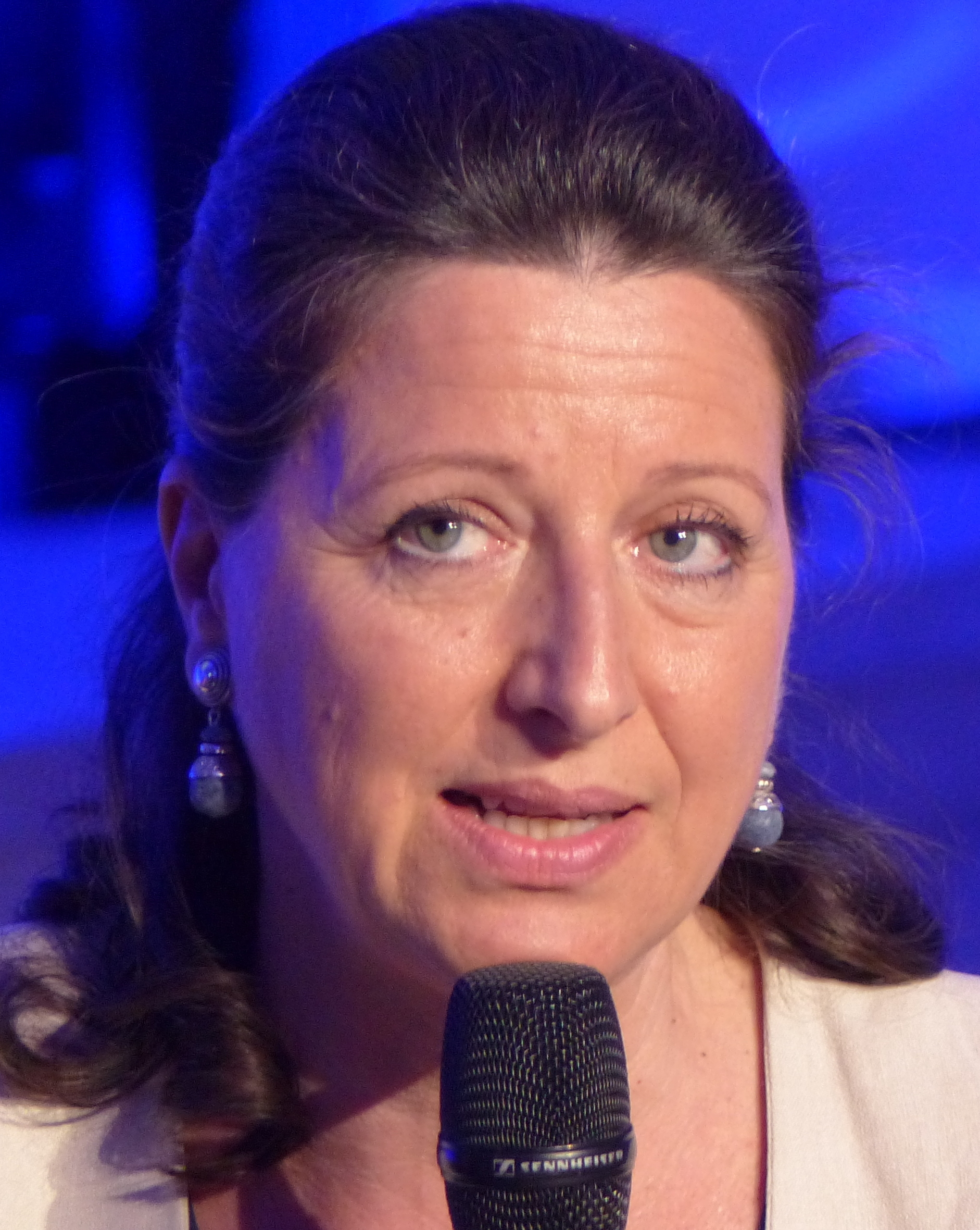

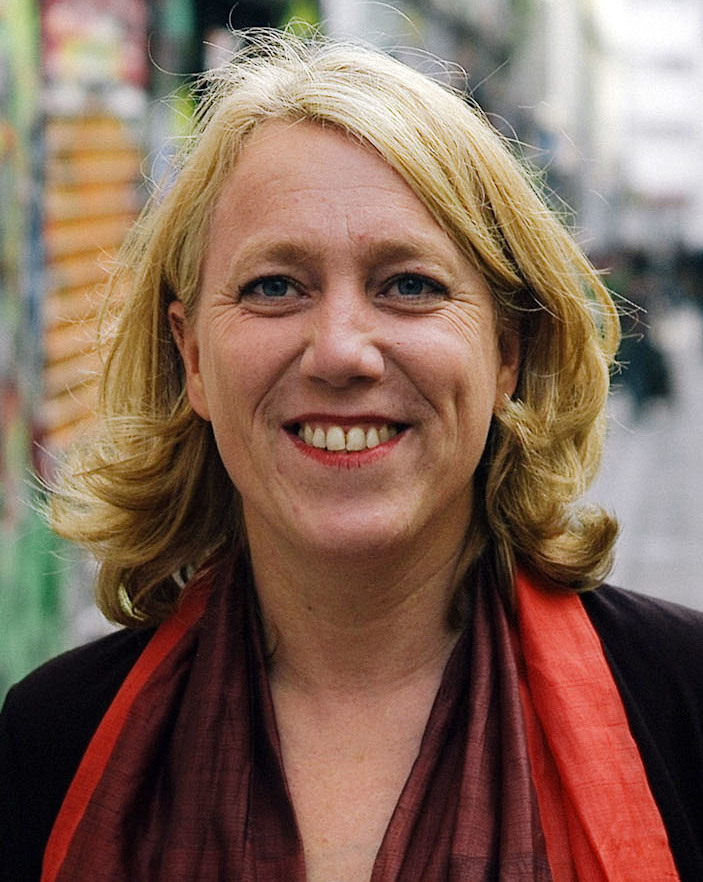
	First party	Second party
Candidate	Anne Hidalgo	Rachida Dati
Party	PS	LR
Alliance	Endorsed by: French Communist Party; Place Publique; New Deal; Génération.s; Republican and Socialist Left; Citizen and Republican Movement; Movement of Progressives; Citizen and Republican Movement; The Ecologists (Note: After David Belliard withdrew before the second round.); Animalist Party; Ecology Generation; Ecology at the Centre	Endorsed by: The Centrists
Last election	91 seats	71 seats
Seats won	96	58
Seat change	▲5	▼13
Popular vote	162,219	125,639
Percentage	29.33%	22.72%
Popular vote (2nd)	224,790	167,516
Percentage (2nd)	48.49%	36.13%
	Third party	Fourth party
Candidate	Agnès Buzyn	Danielle Simonnet
Party	LREM	LFI
Alliance	Endorsed by: Union of Democrats and Independents; Democratic Movement; Agir; Radical Movement; Centrist Alliance	Endorsed by: Left Party; Ecological Revolution for the Living; Ensemble!
Last election	New	1 seat
Seats won	8	1
Seat change	▲8	Steady
Popular vote	99,767	25,731
Percentage	18.04%	10.79%
Popular vote (2nd)	60,470	4,921
Percentage (2nd)	13.04%	1.06%
Mayor before election
Anne Hidalgo
PS
Elected Mayor
Anne Hidalgo
PS

The 2020 Paris municipal election was a municipal election that took place in Paris on 15 March 2020, alongside other French municipal elections. The second round, which was originally scheduled to be held on 22 March 2020, was postponed due to the COVID-19 pandemic in France. The second round took place on 28 June 2020, which saw Anne Hidalgo re-elected as mayor of Paris.

== Background ==
In the 2014 Paris municipal election, Anne Hidalgo of the Socialist Party was elected mayor of Paris, becoming the first woman to hold that position. She had previously served as deputy mayor during Bertrand Delanoë's tenure as mayor. Hidalgo won with around 55% of the vote in the second round, defeating Nathalie Kosciusko-Morizet of the Union for a Popular Movement, who had finished ahead of her in the first round of voting.

While Emmanuel Macron's La République En Marche! (LREM) won 12 of the 18 Paris constituencies during the 2017 French legislative election, the incumbent Hidalgo still retained a narrow lead in polling, even with criticism over the aborted Autolib' carsharing scheme and the debt increase over her term. While LREM initially picked Benjamin Griveaux to run, another major LREM candidate, mathematician Cédric Villani, chose to continue and officially announced his candidacy on 9 September. Macron was reported to have asked Villani to unite behind Griveaux on 26 January to avoid vote splitting, which Villani refused, partially seeing his candidacy as "faithful to the LREM spirit" of grassroots politics. Villani, while of similar popularity to Griveaux, was considered unlikely to win.

On 14 February, Benjamin Griveaux withdrew from the election after leaked sexts allegedly between him and another woman were leaked 48 hours earlier, stating: "For more than a year, my family and I have been subjected to defamatory remarks, lies, rumours, anonymous attacks, the revelation of stolen private conversations and death threats. As if all this was not enough, yesterday a new level was reached." This was arguably unusual, with the French public largely seen as apathetic to politicians and extramarital affairs, an example being François Mitterrand. The leak was condemned on all sides of politics. Jean-Luc Mélenchon of La France Insoumise (LFI) said: "The publication of intimate images to destroy an adversary is odious." Marine Le Pen of National Rally suggested that Griveaux should not have stepped down. Hidalgo, the Socialist Mayor, commented that "Parisians deserve a dignified debate." Villani tweeted: "The attack he has been subject to is a serious threat to our democracy." It has been seen as an intrusion into private life that is considered off limits, with Alexis Corbière of LFI called the "Americanisation" of politics, where "people have to apologise for having lovers or mistresses". Petr Pavlensky, who released the link states it was to expose his hypocrisy, quoted as saying: "He [Griveaux] is someone who is always mentioning family values. He said he would be the mayor of Paris families and citing the example of his wife and children, while doing the opposite." Griveaux's private lawyer has reported that he will press charges.

The first round of municipal elections in France took place on 15 March 2020 against the backdrop of the government decision to move to Stage III of measures to mitigate the COVID-19 pandemic. Stringent restrictions on public life involving the closure of bars, restaurants and other businesses considered non-essential were set to begin the following day. Then-Health Minister, Agnès Buzyn, resigned on 16 February 2020 to run for the Paris mayor as the official candidate of LREM. She is succeeded by Olivier Véran, a neurologist. The decision to press ahead with the election was justified as being critical to democratic life in the country, despite concerns about when a second round could be held as the toll of infections and deaths continued to rise. In the end, the turnout of registered voters was 40%, lower than in 1971 – the previous record for lowest turnout.

== Process ==
The municipal elections are held independently in each of Paris's 20 boroughs (i.e. arrondissements) (with the central four regrouped into the Paris Centre sector).

In the first round, if a list wins an overall majority, the seats are apportioned. If no list reaches an overall majority, then a second round is organized. Any list below the 5% threshold is directly eliminated, and any list below the 10% threshold cannot qualify itself for the runoff (lists between 5% and 10% are still allowed to merge with other lists above 10%). Lists above the 10% threshold are qualified for the runoff, in which the seats are apportioned between all lists above the threshold of 5% of the votes.

In the seats apportionment, half of the seats are automatically given to the list winning the plurality as a majority bonus, and the rest of the seats are apportioned proportionally.

The elections are held on two levels: the borough level, and the municipal level. The seats are apportioned using the same rules and the same ballots, so a candidate can be elected to both borough councilor and municipal councilor (and take both offices). Usually, the list winning the plurality in a borough, after receiving an overall majority of the seats (due to the majority bonus), elects its head of list to sit as borough mayor.

Finally, the Council of Paris elects the mayor in three rounds, needing an absolute majority in the first two rounds, or a plurality in the third round if needed.

== Polls ==
=== First round ===

==== 2020 ====
Polling firm	Fieldwork date	Sample size	Abs.	None LO	Simonnet FI–REV	Hidalgo PS–PCF–PP	Belliard EELV	Gantzer Parisiennes, Parisiens	Villani REM–PRG	Buzyn REM–MR–UDI	Griveaux REM–MR–UDI	Bournazel Agir	Dati LR	Saint-Just RN	Federbusch RN	Campion Libérons Paris	Other
2020 election	15 Mar 2020	–	57.70%	0.59%	4.57%	29.33%	10.79%	0.49%	7.10%	18.04%	–	–	22.72%	–	1.47%	0.45%	4.45%
Ifop-Fiducial	5–13 Mar 2020	1,424	11.4%	–	5%	25.5%	11.5%	–	7%	19%	–	–	24%	–	3.5%	1%	3.5%
OpinionWay (for REM)	11–12 Mar 2020	1,420	13%	<1%	6%	24%	11%	–	5%	20%	–	–	26%	–	3%	1%	4%
Ifop-Fiducial	5–10 Mar 2020	1,101	–	–	5%	26%	11%	–	7.5%	18%	–	–	24%	–	3.5%	1%	4%
Ipsos	6–9 Mar 2020	950	5%	1%	4.5%	26%	11%	0.5%	7%	19%	–	–	23%	–	4%	0.5%	3.5%
OpinionWay	6 Mar 2020	?	?	<1%	6%	23%	13%	–	6%	18%	–	–	26%	–	3%	1%	4%
Ipsos	5–6 Mar 2020	1,000	4%	1%	4%	25%	12%	0.5%	7%	19%	–	–	24%	–	4%	0.5%	3.5%
BVA	2–6 Mar 2020	1,202	–	0.5%	4%	24%	12%	0.5%	7%	19%	–	–	25%	–	4%	1%	3.5%
Harris Interactive	28 Feb–2 Mar 2020	1,119	–	1%	5%	24%	11%	–	8%	17%	–	–	25%	–	4%	0.5%	4.5%
Ifop-Fiducial	25–28 Feb 2020	946	–	–	5%	24%	11%	–	8%	20%	–	–	25%	–	3.5%	0.5%	3%
Elabe	23–28 Feb 2020	1,001	5%	–	5%	24%	9.5%	–	10.5%	18.5%	–	–	25%	–	4%	1.5%	2%
Ifop-Fiducial	17–21 Feb 2020	976	–	–	6%	24%	12%	0.5%	9%	19%	–	–	22%	–	3.5%	1%	3%
Ipsos	18–19 Feb 2020	1,000	4%	1%	5%	24%	13%	1.5%	9%	19%	–	–	20%	–	4%	1%	2.5%
Harris Interactive	17–19 Feb 2020	1,092	15%	1%	6%	23%	13%	1%	10%	17%	–	–	23%	–	5%	1%	–
Odoxa	17–19 Feb 2020	809	15%	–	7%	23%	14%	1%	7%	17%	–	–	25%	–	4%	2%	–
Odoxa	21–23 Jan 2020	916	14%	2%	4%	23%	14.5%	2%	10%	–	16%	–	20%	–	6%	0.5%	2%
Ifop	13–17 Jan 2020	955	–	1%	5%	25%	14%	1%	13%	–	15%	–	19%	–	5%	0.5%	2.5%
Ifop	13–17 Jan 2020	955	–	1%	5%	25%	14%	0.5%	12%	–	16%	3%	17%	–	5%	0.5%	2%
Odoxa	14–20 Jan 2020	879	18%	1%	8%	24%	13%	1%	11%	–	16%	3%	18%	–	5%	1%	1%

==== 2018–19 ====
Polling firm	Fieldwork date	Sample size	Abs.	None LO	Simonnet FI–REV	Hidalgo PS–PCF–PP	Belliard EELV	Gantzer Parisiennes, Parisiens	Villani REM–PRG	Mahjoubi REM–MR–UDI	Renson REM–MR–UDI	Griveaux REM–MR–UDI	Bournazel Agir	Berthout LR	Dati LR	Saint-Just RN	Federbusch RN	Campion Libérons Paris	Other
Ifop (for Villani)	2–6 Dec 2019	1,043	16.7%	1%	6%	22.5%	12.5%	–	14%	–	–	17%	4%	–	17%	–	5%	0.5%	1.5%
Ifop (for Villani)	4–8 Nov 2019	1,055	–	1%	5.5%	22%	15.5%	1%	12%	–	–	16%	4%	–	16%	–	5.5%	0.5%	2%
OpinionWay (for Griveaux)	4–12 Nov 2019	2,942	15%	–	7%	19%	13%	2%	12%	–	–	18%	4%	–	16%	–	7%	2%	–
Ipsos	17–20 Sep 2019	815	8%	1%	6%	26%	12%	1%	–	–	–	26%	6%	–	14%	–	6%	2%	–
Ipsos	17–20 Sep 2019	815	6%	1%	6%	24%	11%	1%	15%	–	–	19%	4%	–	13%	–	5%	1%	–
Ifop-Fiducial	9–12 Sep 2019	968	–	0.5%	5%	24%	13%	1%	15%	–	–	17%	5%	–	14%	–	4%	–	1.5%
Ifop (for Villani)	20–27 Jun 2019	951	13.4%	1%	6%	22%	15%	2%	26%	–	–	–	6%	–	15%	5%	–	1%	1%
Ifop (for Villani)	20–27 Jun 2019	951	12.8%	1%	5%	24%	14%	2%	–	–	–	27%	5%	–	16%	5%	–	–	1%
BVA	6–11 Jun 2019	1,294	6%	1.5%	5%	21%	13%	3%	–	22%	–	–	6%	–	16%	5%	–	1%	6.5%
BVA	6–11 Jun 2019	1,294	5%	1.5%	5%	21%	13%	3%	25%	–	–	–	5%	–	15%	5%	–	1%	5.5%
BVA	6–11 Jun 2019	1,294	6%	1.5%	5%	21%	13%	3%	–	–	–	25%	5%	–	15%	5%	–	1%	5.5%
Elabe	28–31 Mar 2019	999	–	1.5%	8.5%	25%	8.5%	3.5%	21%	–	–	–	4.5%	14.5%	–	5%	–	1.5%	6.5%
Elabe	28–31 Mar 2019	999	–	2.5%	6.5%	22%	7.5%	4.5%	20%	–	–	–	4.5%	–	21%	4.5%	–	1.5%	5.5%
Elabe	28–31 Mar 2019	999	–	1%	8%	22%	10%	6.5%	–	17.5%	–	–	5.5%	16.5%	–	4.5%	–	1.5%	7%
Elabe	28–31 Mar 2019	999	–	1%	8.5%	21%	10.5%	4.5%	–	14%	–	–	5%	–	23%	5%	–	1.5%	6%
Elabe	28–31 Mar 2019	999	–	1.5%	9%	21.5%	10%	4.5%	–	–	–	23%	4%	15%	–	4.5%	–	1.5%	5.5%
Elabe	28–31 Mar 2019	999	–	1%	8.5%	22%	9.5%	4%	–	–	–	21%	5%	–	19.5	4.5	–	0.5	4.5
Ifop-Fiducial	14–21 Mar 2019	956	22.6%	1%	8%	25%	10%	4.5%	–	–	–	23%	4.5%	14%	–	7%	–	1%	2%
Ifop-Fiducial	14–21 Mar 2019	956	21.8%	1%	8%	24%	10%	5%	20%	–	–	–	6%	–	15%	6.5%	–	1%	3.5%
Ifop-Fiducial	14–21 Mar 2019	956	22.8%	1%	8%	23%	11%	5%	–	20%	–	–	7%	–	15%	6%	–	1%	3%
Ifop-Fiducial	14–21 Mar 2019	956	21.4%	1%	8%	24%	10%	3%	–	–	–	22%	7%	–	16%	6%	–	1%	2%
ViaVoice (for REM)	7–25 Jan 2019	817	–	3%	8%	24%	13%	–	–	–	–	28%	–	17%	–	4%	–	–	3%
Ifop	12–14 Sep 2018	944	20.4%	2%	7%	24%	8%	5%	–	20%	–	–	–	23%	–	6%	–	1%	4%
Ifop	12–14 Sep 2018	944	23.7%	2%	7%	25%	11%	5%	–	–	17%	–	–	22%	–	6%	–	1%	4%
Ifop	12–14 Sep 2018	944	19.5%	1%	7%	23%	9%	4%	–	–	–	23%	–	21%	–	6%	–	2%	4%

==== March 2018 ====
Polling firm	Fieldwork date	Sample size	Abs.	None LO	Simonnet FI–REV	Hidalgo PS–PCF–PP	Belliard EELV	Griveaux REM–MR–UDI	Berthout LR	Saint-Just RN
Ifop-Fiducial	19–22 Mar 2018	973	–	2%	12%	39%		40%		7%
Ifop-Fiducial	19–22 Mar 2018	973	–	2%	12%	41%			38%	7%
Ifop-Fiducial	19–22 Mar 2018	973	–	1%	11%	29%		32%	21%	6%

=== Second round ===
Polling firm	Fieldwork date	Sample size	Abs.	Hidalgo PS–PCF–PP	Belliard EELV	Villani REM–PRG	Buzyn REM–MR–UDI	Griveaux REM–MR–UDI	Dati LR	Other
2020 election	28 Jun 2020	–	63.30%	48.49%		0.94%	13.04%	–	34.31%	3.22%
Ifop-Fiducial	22–26 Jun 2020	925	–	44%		–	18%	–	35%	3%
Elabe	19–23 Jun 2020	1,001	8%	44%		0.5%	18%	–	35%	2.5%
BVA	12–18 Jun 2020	1,200	9%	45%		0.5%	18%	–	34%	2.5%
Ifop-Fiducial	2–5 Jun 2020	974	–	44%		–	20%	–	33%	3%
Ifop-Fiducial	5–13 Mar 2020	1,424	16.8%	41%		27%		–	32%	–
Ifop-Fiducial	5–10 Mar 2020	1,101	–	41%		26%		–	33%	–
Ipsos	6–9 Mar 2020	950	–	42%		26%		–	32%	–
Ipsos	5–6 Mar 2020	1,000	–	42%		26%		–	32%	–
Ifop-Fiducial	25–28 Feb 2020	946	–	39%		28%		–	33%	–
Ifop-Fiducial	25–28 Feb 2020	946	–	37%		9%	22%	–	32%	–
Elabe	23–28 Feb 2020	1,001	–	29.5%	12%	–	27.5%	–	31%	–
Elabe	23–28 Feb 2020	1,001	–	36%		10.5%	23%	–	30.5%	–
Elabe	23–28 Feb 2020	1,001	–	37%		29.5%		–	33.5%	–
Ifop-Fiducial	17–21 Feb 2020	976	–	40%		28%		–	32%	–
Ifop-Fiducial	17–21 Feb 2020	976	–	38%		11%	21%	–	30%	–
Odoxa	17–19 Feb 2020	809	21%	33%	33%			–	34%	–
Odoxa	17–19 Feb 2020	809	20%	42%		25%		–	33%	–
Odoxa	17–19 Feb 2020	809	20%	38%		10%	20%	–	32%	–
Odoxa	21–23 Jan 2020	916	20%	40%		29%			31%	–
Odoxa	21–23 Jan 2020	916	20%	39%		15%	–	19%	27%	–
Ifop	13–17 Jan 2020	955	–	41%		17%	–	20%	22%	–
Ifop (for Villani)	20–27 Jun 2019	951	17.4%	49%	–	51%	–	–	–	–
Ifop (for Villani)	20–27 Jun 2019	951	15.4%	51%	–	–	–	49%	–	–
Ifop (for Villani)	20–27 Jun 2019	951	13.8%	40%	–	38%	–	–	22%	–
Ifop (for Villani)	20–27 Jun 2019	951	14.1%	41%	–	–	–	37%	22%	–

== Results ==
The first round of the 2020 Paris Mayoral election saw incumbent mayor Anne Hidalgo, a Socialist, comfortably ahead with 30% of the vote. Her closest rival, conservative Rachida Dati, won 22%, while 17.7% was garnered by French President Emmanuel Macron’s official candidate, former health minister Agnes Buzyn. A dissident from Macron's party, Cedric Villani, won 8%. Hidalgo was re-elected as Mayor of Paris in the second round after receiving 50.2 percent of the vote.

This list presents the 163 councillors of Council of Paris elected in the 2014 Paris municipal election.

2020 Parisian municipal election
Party or parties	Lead candidate for mayor	First round		Second round		Seats	
Party or parties	Lead candidate for mayor	Votes	%	Votes	%	CA	CP
Paris in common (PS-PCF-PP-G.s-AE)	Anne Hidalgo	162,219	29.33	224,790	48.49	186	73
Committed to change Paris (LR-LC-OF)	Rachida Dati	125,639	22.72	167,516	36.13	127	60
Together for Paris (LREM-Act-MoDem-MRSL-UDI)	Agnès Buzyn	99,767	18.04	60,470	13.04	24	6
The Ecology for Paris (EÉLV)	David Belliard	59,649	10.79	– (Note: Merged with Together for Paris for the runoffs)		–	23
The New Paris (diss. LREM)	Cédric Villani	39,259	7.10	4,368	0.94	1	0
Let's decide Paris (LFI-REV)	Danielle Simonnet and Vikash Dhorasoo	25,271	4.57	4,921	1.06	1	1
Les Républicains dissidents		19,385	3.50	1,512	0.33	1	0
To Love Paris (RN-DLF)	Serge Federbusch	8,114	1.47				
Lutte Ouvrière	–	3,264	0.59				
Dear Parisians	–	2,693	0.49				
Free Paris	Marcel Campion	2,509	0.45				
Soyons libres	–	2,493	0.45				
Other independents		1,075	0.19				
No to the privatisation of Paris (POID)	–	603	0.11				
Other LREM dissidents		324	0.06				
Citizen Bet/Paris	Christophe Berkani	224	0.04				
I love you Paris (UPR)	–	176	0.03				
A bet/Paris for Europe (Volt)	–	95	0.02				
Total		553,017	100	463,567	100	340	163

== Arrondissements ==
Control of Paris' twenty arrondissements were also decided in the election. At the last election, ten were won by the Socialist Party, nine by the UMP and one by EELV. Paris Centre was contested for the first time, which is formed by the 1st arrondissement of Paris, 2nd arrondissement of Paris, 3rd arrondissement of Paris, and the 4th arrondissement of Paris.

Arrondissement	Outgoing mayor	Party	Elected mayor	Party
Paris	Anne Hidalgo	PS	Anne Hidalgo	PS
Centre			Ariel Weil	PS
5th	Florence Berthout	LREM	Florence Berthout	DVD
6th	Jean-Pierre Lecoq	LR	Jean-Pierre Lecoq	LR
7th	Rachida Dati	LR	Rachida Dati	LR
8th	Jeanne d'Hauteserre	LR	Jeanne d'Hauteserre	LR
9th	Delphine Bürkli	DVD	Delphine Bürkli	DVD
10th	Alexandra Cordebard	PS	Alexandra Cordebard	PS
11th	François Vauglin	PS	François Vauglin	PS
12th	Catherine Baratti-Elbaz	PS	Emmanuelle Pierre-Marie	LE
13th	Jérôme Coumet	DVG	Jérôme Coumet	DVG
14th	Carine Petit	Gs	Carine Petit	Gs
15th	Philippe Goujon	LR	Philippe Goujon	LR
16th	Danièle Giazzi	LR	Francis Szpiner	LR
17th	Geoffroy Boulard	LR	Geoffroy Boulard	LR
18th	Éric Lejoindre	PS	Éric Lejoindre	PS
19th	François Dagnaud	PS	François Dagnaud	PS
20th	Frédérique Calandra	LREM	Eric Pliez	PP

== See also ==
- List of Paris councillors
- 2020 French municipal elections
  - 2020 Ain municipal elections
  - 2020 Allier municipal elections
  - 2020 Bas-Rhin municipal elections
  - 2020 Caen municipal election
