= Marie Silin =

French politician (born 1979)

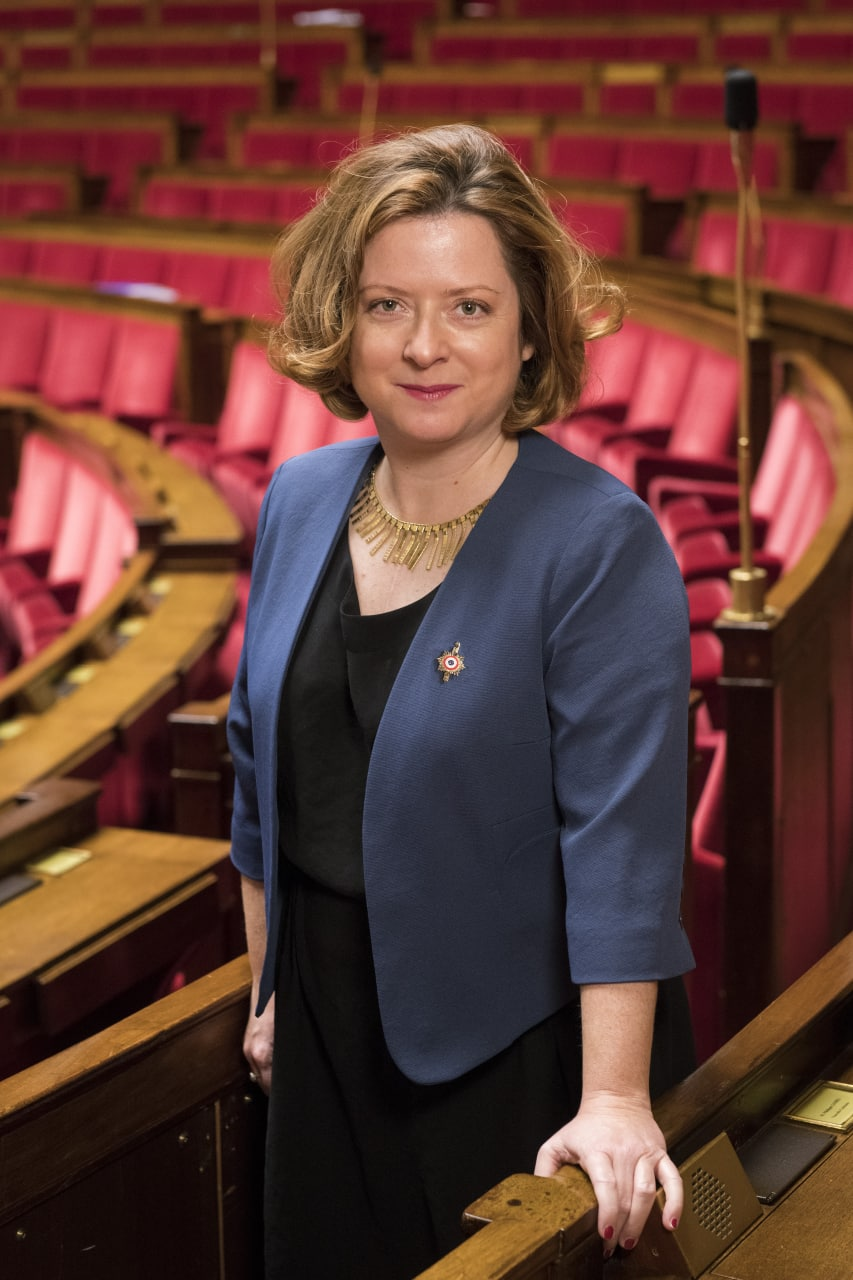

Member of the National Assembly for Paris's 12th constituency
- In office 27 August 2020 – 21 June 2022
- Preceded by: Olivia Grégoire
- Succeeded by: Olivia Grégoire

Personal details
- Born: 4 October 1979 (age 47) Saint-Cloud, France
- Party: La République En Marche!
- Education: ESCP Business School

Marie Silin (French pronunciation: [maʁi silɛ̃]; born 4 October 1979) is a French politician who represented the 12th constituency of Paris in the National Assembly from 2020 to 2022. A member of La République En Marche! (LREM), she was elected as Olivia Grégoire's substitute in 2017.

== Biography ==
She graduated from the ESCP Business School in 2004. In 2009, she joined Électricité de France, a public service company responsible for the electricity distribution network, and in 2016 became head of international institutional relations.

She is a candidate in the 2020 Paris municipal election in the 15th arrondissement, on the LREM list led by Catherine Ibled.

She has been a member of parliament for Paris since August 27, 2020. She joined the La République en Marche group led by Christophe Castaner.
