= Fanta Berete =

French politician (born 1975)

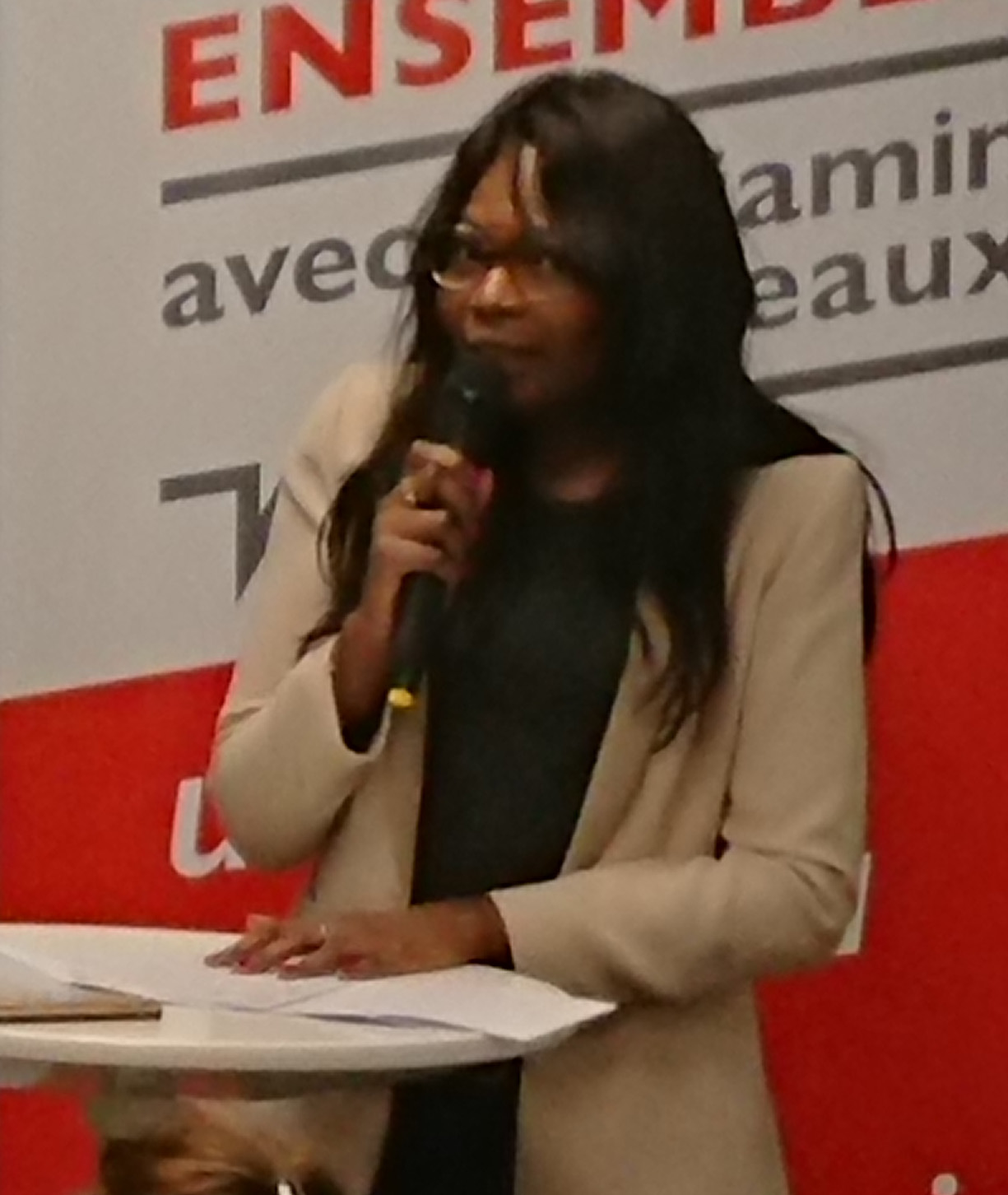
- Berete in 2020

Member of the National Assembly for Paris's 12th constituency
- In office 22 June 2022 – 9 June 2024
- Preceded by: Olivia Grégoire
- Succeeded by: Olivia Grégoire

Personal details
- Born: 31 July 1975 (age 50) Lyon, France
- Party: En Marche

Fanta Berete (born 31 July 1975) is a French politician of Renaissance who has been serving as a Member of Parliament for Paris's 12th constituency since 2022. She was the substitute of Olivia Grégoire who became a government minister.

== Political career ==
Ahead of the 2020 Paris municipal election, Berete served on the campaign team of candidate Benjamin Griveaux.

In parliament, Berete has been serving on the Committee on Social Affairs.

In addition to her committee assignments, Berete is part of the French-American Parliamentary Friendship Group.

== See also ==
- List of deputies of the 16th National Assembly of France
