= Olivia Grégoire =

French politician (born 1978)

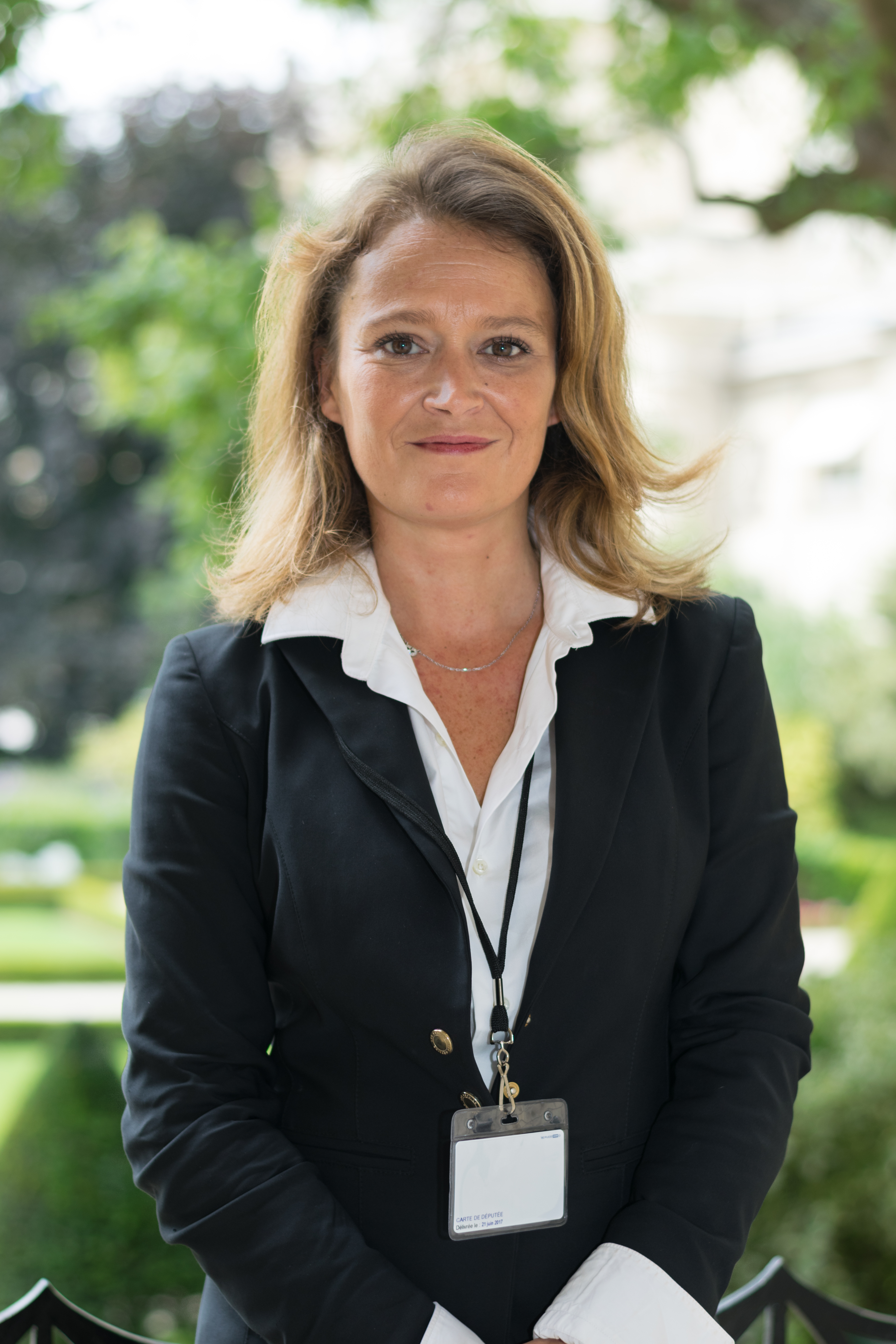

Minister Delegate for Small and Medium Enterprise, Trade, Craft and Tourism
- In office 4 July 2022 – 21 September 2024
- President: Emmanuel Macron
- Prime Minister: Élisabeth Borne
- Preceded by: Jean-Baptiste Lemoyne

Spokesperson of the Government
- In office 20 May 2022 – 4 July 2022
- President: Emmanuel Macron
- Prime Minister: Élisabeth Borne
- Preceded by: Gabriel Attal
- Succeeded by: Olivier Véran

Secretary of State for Social Economy
- In office 27 July 2020 – 20 May 2022
- President: Emmanuel Macron
- Prime Minister: Jean Castex
- Preceded by: Martine Pinville

Member of the National Assembly for Paris's 12th constituency
- Incumbent
- Assumed office 8 July 2024
- Preceded by: Fanta Berete
- In office 22 June 2022 – 22 July 2022
- Preceded by: Marie Silin
- Succeeded by: Fanta Barete
- In office 21 June 2017 – 26 August 2020
- Preceded by: Philippe Goujon
- Succeeded by: Marie Silin

Personal details
- Born: 30 September 1978 (age 48) Paris, France
- Party: Renaissance
- Education: Paris Nanterre University; Sciences Po; ESSEC Business School

Olivia Grégoire (French pronunciation: [ɔlivja ɡʁeɡwaʁ]; born 30 September 1978) is a French politician of Renaissance (RE) who has been serving as Minister for Small and Medium Enterprises, Trade, Crafts and Tourism under President Emmanuel Macron since 2022.

Grégoire previously served as Government Spokesperson in the government of Prime Minister Élisabeth Borne (2022) and as Secretary of State for Social Economy in the government of Prime Minister Jean Castex (2020–2022). Grégoire has served member of the National Assembly for the 12th constituency of Paris from 2017 and 2020, in 2022, and since 2024.

== Early life and career ==
After a khâgne in Neuilly-sur-Seine, Grégoire gained a Licence in history from Paris Nanterre University in 1999. She graduated from Sciences Po in 2001, the same year as Emmanuel Macron, then completed a master's degree in marketing at ESSEC Business School in 2002.

From 2002 to 2005, Grégoire worked for the press office of Prime Minister Jean-Pierre Raffarin, as well as from 2005 until 2007 as an adviser and strategist for Health Minister Xavier Bertrand. Between 2007 and 2014 she worked in communications and marketing for the multinational companies DDB Worldwide, Havas and Saint-Gobain, and for the government communications agency Etalab. She founded Olicare, a communications and strategy consultancy, in 2014.

== Political career ==
Grégoire joined Emmanuel Macron's En Marche! movement in March 2016, a month before it was publicly launched, and was involved in designing the movement's policies on health-care. In the 2017 legislative elections she was elected with 56.36% of the vote, defeating Philippe Goujon of The Republicans.

Within her parliamentary group, Grégoire was one of the spokespersons. She was also a member of the Finance Committee, a parliamentary committee that scrutinizes public spending. At the beginning of the term, Grégoire and Valérie Oppelt launched an informal group of around 50 LREM members in support of strengthening entrepreneurship.

She was re-elected to parliament in the 2022 French legislative election, but returned to government, and so was replaced by her substitute Fanta Berete.

== Political positions ==
In July 2019, Grégoire voted in favor of the French ratification of the European Union’s Comprehensive Economic and Trade Agreement (CETA) with Canada.
