= Paris's 12th constituency =

Constituency of the National Assembly of France

12th constituency of Paris
- inline Constituency of the National Assembly of France

- Paris, showing its post 2012 legislative constituencies
- Deputy: Olivia Grégoire; RE
- Department: Paris
- Registered voters: 73,914

The 12th constituency of Paris (French: Douzième circonscription de Paris) is a French legislative constituency in the Paris département (75). Like the other 576 French constituencies, it elects one MP using the two-round system. Its boundaries were heavily redrawn in 1988 and 2012.

12th constituency of Paris
- inline Constituency of the National Assembly of France

- Paris, showing its legislative constituencies between 1988 and 2012
- Member: constituency abolished, 2012
- Department: Paris

Map of Paris constituencies in 1981.

== Historic representation ==
Election	Member	Party	Source
1958	Pierre-Louis Bourgoin	UNR	
1962	Pierre-Louis Bourgoin	UNR	
1967	Pierre-Louis Bourgoin	UDR	
1968	Pierre-Louis Bourgoin	UDR	
1970	Pierre de Bénouville	UDR	
1973	Pierre de Bénouville	RI	
1978	Pierre de Bénouville	RPR	
1981	Pierre de Bénouville	RPR	
1986	Proportional representation - no election by constituency		
1988	Édouard Balladur	RPR	
1993	Édouard Balladur	RPR	
1993	Philippe Goujon	RPR	
1995	Édouard Balladur	RPR	
1997	Édouard Balladur	RPR	
2002	Édouard Balladur	UMP	
2007	Philippe Goujon	UMP	
2012	Philippe Goujon	UMP	
2017	Olivia Grégoire	LREM	
2020	Marie Silin	LREM	
2022	Olivia Grégoire	RE	
2022	Fanta Berete	RE	
2024	Olivia Grégoire	RE	

== Election results ==
=== 2024 ===
Candidate	Party	Alliance	First round			Second round		
Candidate	Party	Alliance	Votes	%	+/–	Votes	%	+/–
Olivia Grégoire	RE	ENS	22,145	39.36	-0.15	31,676	65.20	-3.31
Céline Malaisé	PCF	NFP	16,294	28.96	+6.62	16,904	34.80	+3.31
David Attia	LR-RN	UXD	8,111	14.41	+10.31			
Jérôme Loriau	LR		7,297	12.97	-4.59			
Philippe Cuignache d'Apreval	REC		947	1.68	-6.14			
Alienor Billault-Harle	DVE		850	1.51	N/A			
Arnaud de Gontaut Biron	DVC		449	0.80	N/A			
Muriel Monchal	LO		156	0.28	-0.18			
Laszlo Ferréol	DIV		19	0.03	N/A			
Joachim Mileschi	EXG		0	0.00	N/A			
Valid votes			56,268	98.96	+0.13	48,580	93.76	+0.27
Blank votes			406	0.71	-0.16	2,500	4.82	-0.13
Null votes			186	0.33	+0.03	735	1.42	-0.14
Turnout			56,860	75.30	+16.58	51,815	68.62	+13.21
Abstentions			18,655	24.70	-16.58	23,700	31.38	-13.21
Registered voters			75,515			75,515		
Source: Ministry of the Interior, Le Monde
Result						RE HOLD		

=== 2022 ===
Legislative Election 2022: Paris's 12th constituency
Party	Candidate	Votes	%	±%
LREM (Ensemble)	Olivia Grégoire	17,380	39.51	-7.47
PCF (NUPÉS)	Céline Malaisé	9,829	22.34	+8.61
LR (UDC)	Jérôme Loriau	7,724	17.56	−12.33
REC	Benoit de Clinchamp-Bellegarde	3,441	7.82	N/A
UDI (UDC)	Chloé Bouley	2,370	5.39	N/A
RN	Agnès Pageard	1,804	4.10	−1.50
Others	N/A	1,441		
Turnout		44,519	58.72	−2.98
2nd round result
LREM (Ensemble)	Olivia Grégoire	26,908	68.51	+12.15
PCF (NUPÉS)	Céline Malaisé	12,368	31.49	N/A
Turnout		39,276	55.41	+1.76
LREM hold				

=== 2017 ===
Legislative Election 2017: Paris's 12th constituency
Party	Candidate	Votes	%	±%
LREM	Olivia Grégoire	21,275	46.98	N/A
LR	Philippe Goujon	13,489	29.79	−20.08
PS	Florian Sitbon	2,606	5.75	−26.33
LFI	Patrick Lefrancois	2,538	5.60	N/A
FN	Agnès Pageard	2,538	5.60	+0.47
EELV	France Talandier	1,076	2.38	N/A
Others	N/A	2,950		
Turnout		45,615	61.70	−1.20
2nd round result
LREM	Olivia Grégoire	21,082	56.36	N/A
LR	Philippe Goujon	16,327	43.64	−16.72
Turnout		39,652	53.65	−5.43
LREM gain from LR		Swing		

=== 2012 ===
Legislative Election 2012: Paris's 12th constituency
Party	Candidate	Votes	%	±%
UMP	Philippe Goujon	22,370	49.87	+1.85
PS	Capucine Edou	14,391	32.08	+11.49
FN	Catherine Salvisberg	2,302	5.13	+2.61
MoDem	Stéphane Cosse	1,985	4.43	−8.61
FG	Marianne Journiac	1,174	2.62	N/A
Others	N/A	2,634		
Turnout		44,856	62.90	−1.95
2nd round result
UMP	Philippe Goujon	25,420	60.36	−2.43
PS	Capucine Edou	16,697	39.64	+2.43
Turnout		42,117	59.08	+1.47
UMP hold				

=== 2007 ===
Elections between 1988 and 2007 were based on the 1988 boundaries.

Map of Paris Constituencies, 1988-2007 elections

Legislative Election 2007: Paris's 12th constituency
Party	Candidate	Votes	%	±%
UMP	Philippe Goujon	20,960	48.02	
PS	Claude Dargent	8,988	20.59	
MoDem	Elisabeth De Fresquet	5,692	13.04	
DVD	Cecile Renson	2,537	5.81	
LV	Françoise Kiefe	1,212	2.78	
FN	Rodolphe Husset	1,100	2.52	
Others	N/A	3,160		
Turnout		43,970	64.85	
2nd round result
UMP	Philippe Goujon	23,907	62.79	
PS	Claude Dargent	14,170	37.21	
Turnout		39,066	57.61	
UMP hold				

=== 2002 ===
Legislative Election 2002: Paris's 12th constituency
Party	Candidate	Votes	%	±%
UMP	Edouard Balladur	23,661	54.17	
PS	Anne Hidalgo	12,939	29.62	
FN	Thierry Martin	2,581	5.91	
DIV	Bernard Menez	996	2.28	
Others	N/A	3,502		
Turnout		44,069	72.00	
UMP hold				

=== 1997 ===
Legislative Election 1997: Paris's 12th constituency
Party	Candidate	Votes	%	±%
RPR	Edouard Balladur	19,175	49.34	
PS	Anne Le Moal	8,467	21.79	
FN	Raphaële Dor	3,283	8.45	
LV	Emmanuelle Falsanisi	1,282	3.30	
PCF	Raymonde Contensous	1,265	3.26	
DVD	Isabelle Deschard	977	2.51	
Others	N/A	4,411		
Turnout		39,951	63.27	
2nd round result
RPR	Edouard Balladur	25,575	65.21	
PS	Anne Le Moal	13,646	34.79	
Turnout		40,739	64.52	
RPR hold				
