= Administration of Paris =

Municipal government of Paris, France

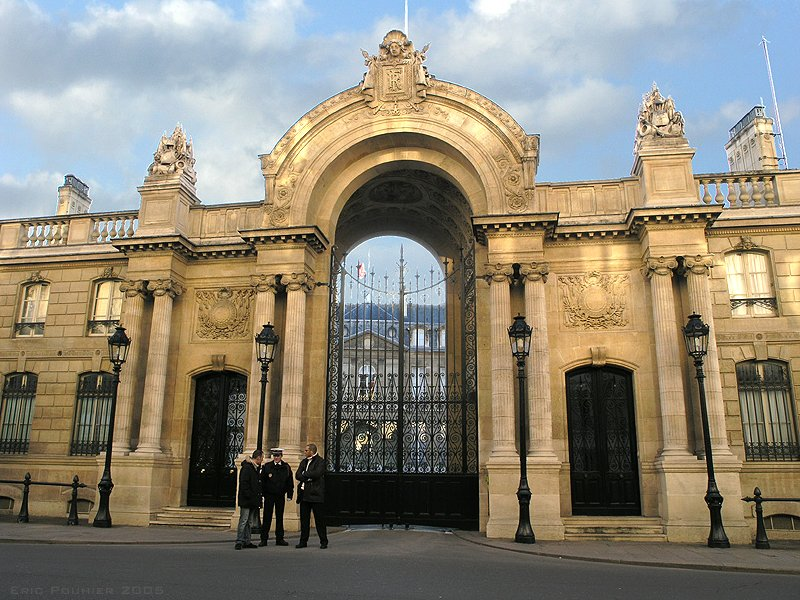
The Élysée Palace, official residence of the French President on the Rue du Faubourg-Saint-Honoré

As the capital of France, Paris is the seat of France's national government. For the executive, the two chief officers each have their own official residences, which also serve as their offices. The President of France resides at the Élysée Palace in the 8th arrondissement. The Prime Minister's seat is at the Hôtel Matignon in the 7th arrondissement. Government ministries are located in various parts of Paris. Many are located in the 7th arrondissement, near Matignon.

The two houses of the French Parliament are located on the left bank. The upper house, the Senate, meets at the Palais du Luxembourg in the 6th arrondissement. The more important, directly elected lower house, the National Assembly, meets at the Palais Bourbon in the 7th arrondissement. The President of the Senate, the second-highest public official in France after the President of the Republic, resides in the Petit Luxembourg, a small annex to the Palais du Luxembourg.

France's highest courts are located in Paris. The Court of Cassation, the highest court in the judicial order, which reviews criminal and civil cases, is located in the Palais de Justice on the Île de la Cité. The Conseil d'État, which provides legal advice to the executive and acts as the highest court in the administrative order, judging litigation against public bodies, is located in the Palais Royal in the 1st arrondissement. The Constitutional Council, an advisory body with ultimate authority on the constitutionality of laws and government decrees, meets in the Montpensier wing of the Palais Royal.

Law no. 2017-257 of February 28, 2017, relating to the status of Paris and metropolitan planning provides in particular for the establishment on January 1, 2019, of a community with a special status bringing together a municipality and a department called "City of Paris", to which additional powers from the police headquarters are transferred.

== City government ==
A map of the arrondissements of Paris

Paris has been a commune (municipality) since 1834, and briefly between 1790 and 1795. At the 1790 division, during the French Revolution, of France into communes, and again in 1834, Paris was a city only half its modern size, composed of 12 arrondissements.

In 1860, Paris annexed bordering communes, some entirely, to create the new administrative map of twenty municipal arrondissements that Paris has today. These municipal subdivisions describe a clockwise spiral outward from its most central, the 1st arrondissement. The arrondissements are as follows (see map for location):

- 1st arrondissement of Paris
- 2nd arrondissement of Paris
- 3rd arrondissement of Paris
- 4th arrondissement of Paris
- 5th arrondissement of Paris
- 6th arrondissement of Paris
- 7th arrondissement of Paris
- 8th arrondissement of Paris
- 9th arrondissement of Paris
- 10th arrondissement of Paris
- 11th arrondissement of Paris
- 12th arrondissement of Paris
- 13th arrondissement of Paris
- 14th arrondissement of Paris
- 15th arrondissement of Paris
- 16th arrondissement of Paris
- 17th arrondissement of Paris
- 18th arrondissement of Paris
- 19th arrondissement of Paris
- 20th arrondissement of Paris

In 1790, Paris became the préfecture (seat) of the Seine département, which covered much of the Paris region. In 1968, it was split into four smaller ones. The city of Paris became a distinct département of its own, retaining the Seine's departmental number of 75, originating from the Seine département's position in France's alphabetical list.

Three new départements, of Hauts-de-Seine, Seine-Saint-Denis and Val-de-Marne, were created and given the numbers 92, 93, and 94, respectively. The result of this division is that today Paris's limits as a département are exactly those of its limits as a commune, a situation unique in France.

In 2010, the city had 29,000 employees.

== Municipal offices ==
Each of Paris's twenty arrondissements has its own town hall and a directly elected council (conseil d'arrondissement), which elects an arrondissement mayor. A selection of members from each arrondissement council form the Council of Paris (conseil de Paris), which elects the mayor of Paris.

In medieval times, Paris was governed by a merchant-elected municipality whose head was the provost of the merchants. In addition to regulating city commerce, the provost of the merchants was responsible for some civic duties, such as the guarding of city walls and the cleaning of city streets. The creation of the provost of Paris from the 13th century diminished the merchant Provost's responsibilities and powers considerably.

Composition of the Council of Paris
Party		Seats
•	Socialist Party	41
•	The Republicans	40
•	The Greens	21
•	Miscellaneous left	15
•	French Communist Party	11
•	Génération.s	6
•	MoDem	5
•	Miscellaneous right	5
•	Renaissance	4
•	Horizons	4
•	The Centrists	4
•	Soyons libres	2
•	Union of Democrats and Independents	1
•	Animalist Party	1
•	Ecology Generation	1
•	L'Après	1
•	Objectif France	1

A direct representative of the king, in a role resembling somewhat the préfet of later years, the Provost (prévôt) of Paris oversaw the application and execution of law and order in the city and its surrounding prévôté (county) from his office in the Grand Châtelet. Many functions from both provost offices were transferred to the office of the crown-appointed lieutenant general of police upon its creation in 1667.

For centuries, the prévôt and magistrates of the Châtelet, clashed with the administrators of the Hôtel de Ville over jurisdiction. The latter notably included the quartiniers, each of whom was responsible for one of the sixteen quartiers. They were divided into four cinquantaines, each with its cinquantainier. They were divided again into dizaines, administered by dizainiers:

All of these men were in principle elected by the local bourgeois. At any one time, therefore, 336 men had shared administrative responsibility for street cleaning and maintenance, for public health, law, and order. The quartiniers maintained the official lists of "bourgeois de Paris", ran local elections, could impose fines for breaches of the bylaws, and had a role in tax assessment. They met at the Hôtel de Ville to confer on matters of citywide importance and each year selected eight of "the most notable inhabitants of the quarter", who together with other local officials would elect the city council.

On 14 July 1789, the last of the Prévôt des marchands of Paris was assassinated on the afternoon of the French Revolution Storming of the Bastille. On 14 December, Paris became an official "commune" from the creation of the administrative division. From 9 October 1790, its provisional "Paris commune" revolutionary municipality was replaced with the city's first municipal constitution and government.

Through the turmoil of the 1794 Thermidorian Reaction, it became apparent that revolutionary Paris's political independence was a threat to any governing power. The office of mayor was abolished the same year, and its municipal council in 1795.

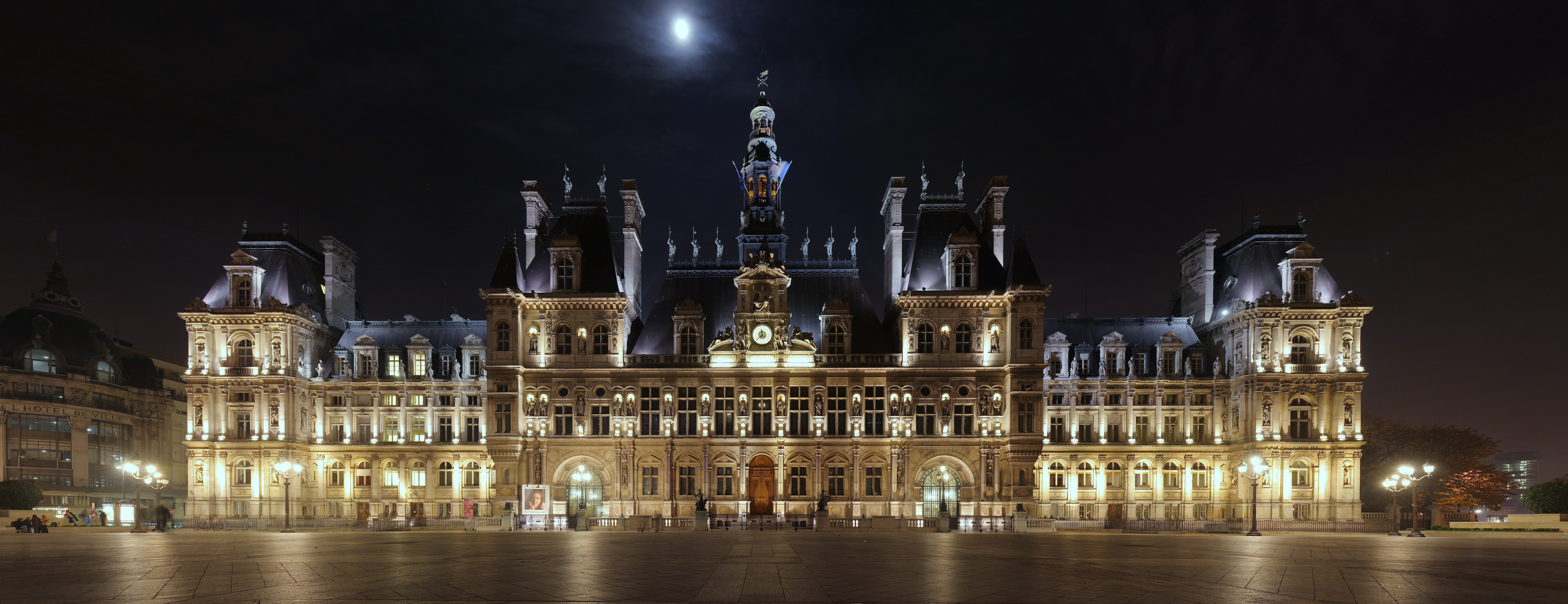
The Hôtel de Ville, Paris, the city hall

Although the municipal council was recreated in 1834, Paris, for most of the 19th and 20th centuries, along with the larger Seine département of which it was a centre — was under the direct control of the state-appointed prefect (préfet) of the Seine department until 1968. From 1968 to 1977, Paris was under the authority of the prefect of Paris.

This left the largest city in the nation as the only one without a mayor, meaning that Paris had less autonomy than the smallest village. The state-appointed Prefect of Police was in charge of police in the same jurisdiction. With the exception of a few brief occasions, Paris did not have a mayor from 1794 to 1977. The Paris Prefecture of Police is under state control today.

Despite its dual existence as commune and département, Paris has a single council to govern both. The Council of Paris, presided over by the mayor of Paris, meets as either as a municipal council (conseil municipal) or a departmental council (conseil général), depending on the issue to be debated. Paris's modern administrative organisation retains some traces of the former Seine département jurisdiction.

The Prefecture of Police, also directing Paris's fire brigades, for example, has a jurisdiction extending to Paris's petite couronne of bordering three départements for some operations such as fire protection or rescue operations, and is directed by France's national government. Paris has no municipal police force, although it does have its own brigade of traffic wardens.

== Prefecture of the Île-de-France region ==
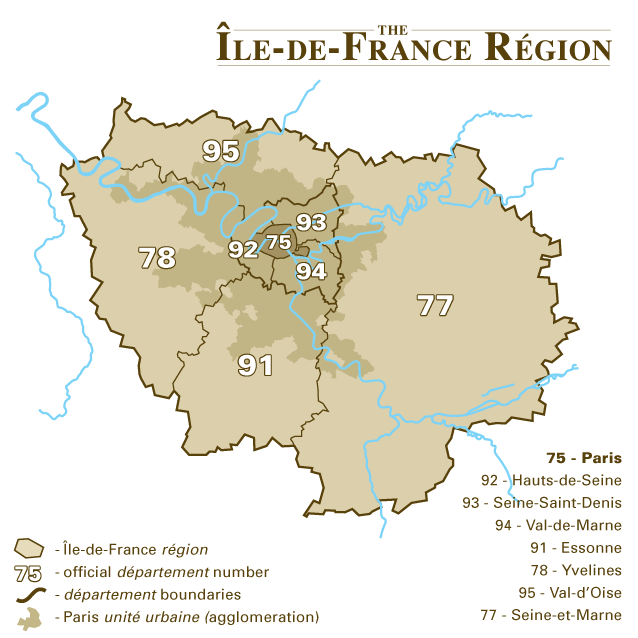
A map of the current departments of Île-de-France

As part of a 1961 nationwide administrative effort to consolidate regional economies, Paris as a département became the capital of the new région of the District of Paris. In 1976, it was renamed the Île-de-France région. It encompasses the Paris département and its seven closest départements. Since 1986, its regional council members have been chosen by direct elections.

The prefect of the Paris département, who served as the prefect of the Seine département before 1968, is also the prefect of the Île-de-France région. In 1977, the office lost much of its power, following the creation of the office of mayor of Paris.

== Intercommunality ==
Few of the above changes have taken into account Paris's existence as an agglomeration. Unlike in most of France's major urban areas such as Lille and Lyon, there is no intercommunal entity in the Paris urban area. There is no intercommunal council treating the problems of the region's dense urban core as a whole. Paris's alienation of its suburbs is indeed a problem today, and one of the main causes of civil unrest such as the suburban riots in 2005.

A direct result of these events are propositions for a more efficient metropolitan structure to cover the city of Paris and some of the suburbs, ranging from a socialist idea of a loose "metropolitan conference" (conférence métropolitaine), to the right-wing idea of a more integrated Grand Paris ("Greater Paris").

== International relations ==
Paris and its region host the headquarters of many international organisations, including UNESCO, the Organisation for Economic Co-operation and Development, the International Chamber of Commerce, the Paris Club, the European Space Agency, the International Energy Agency, the Organisation internationale de la Francophonie, the European Union Institute for Security Studies, the International Bureau of Weights and Measures, the International Exhibition Bureau and the International Federation for Human Rights. Paris is today one of the world's leading business and cultural centres. Paris' influences in politics, education, entertainment, media, science, and the arts all contribute to its status as one of the world's major global cities.
