= PLM Laws =

French laws for electing local officials

Paris–Lyon–Marseille Laws
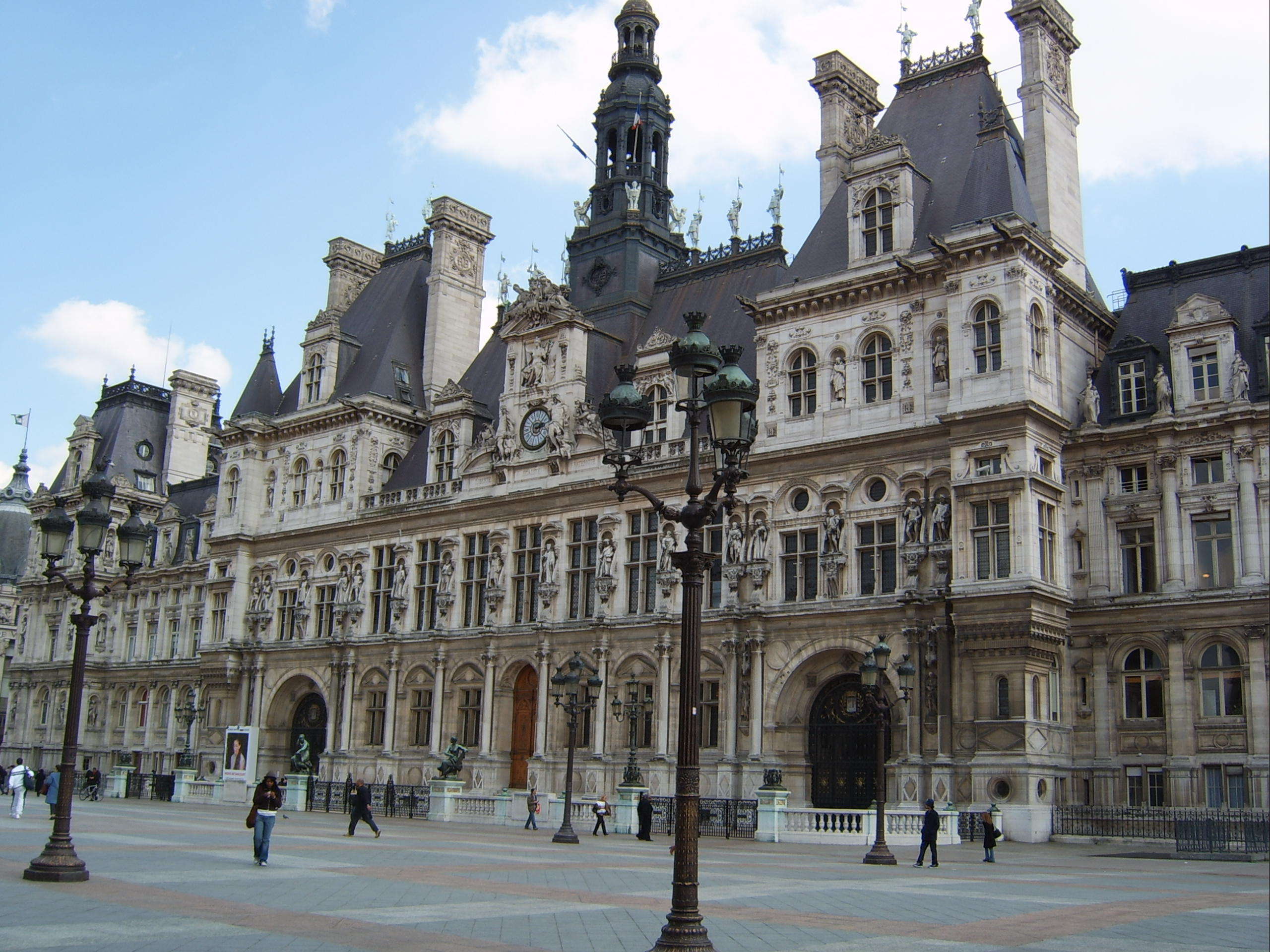
- Paris City Hall

7th legislature (1982) 17th legislature (2025)
- Long title: Law amending certain provisions of the Electoral Code relating to the election of members of the Council of Paris and the municipal councils of Lyon and Marseille (1982) Law reforming the method of election of members of the Council of Paris and the municipal councils of Lyon and Marseille (2025)
- Territorial extent: France (special rules for Paris, Lyon and Marseille)
- Passed by: France
- Passed: 17 December 1982; 9 April 2025
- Assented to: 31 December 1982; 11 August 2025
- Bill citation: Law No. 82-1170; Law No. 2025-795

Related legislation
- Defferre laws (1982)
- Status: In force

The Paris–Lyon–Marseille Laws, commonly abbreviated to the PLM Laws (lois PLM), are a set of French laws that define how the municipal councils and mayors of the country’s three largest cities—Paris, Lyon and Marseille—are elected. The first of these PLM laws dates from 1982, and the second from 2025.

== Overview ==
The legislation was championed by Interior Minister Gaston Defferre and was adopted in the context of the Defferre laws, or decentralisation laws, passed in March of that year. Under the Defferre laws, the arrondissements of each city had their local town halls (mairies d'arrondissement) — which were previously local annexes of the central city hall run by city appointees — converted into arrondissement councils (conseils d'arrondissement) in Paris and Lyon and elected sector councils in Marseille (where sectors group multiple arrondissements). While being locally elected and similar in operation to a municipal council (conseil municipal), they have very few powers and are not full-service municipalities. They cannot raise taxes and instead administer budgets delegated by the central city hall.

The first of the PLM laws, Law No. 82-1170 of 31 December 1982, amended provisions of the French Electoral Code relating to the election of members of the Council of Paris and the municipal councils of Lyon and Marseille, establishing a special electoral status for the three most populous communes in France. Under the 1982 PLM electoral system, municipal elections in Paris, Lyon and Marseille were organised at the arrondissement (Paris and Lyon) or sector level (Marseille). Voters elected an arrondissement/sector council using the two-round proportional list system used in French communes of 1,000+ inhabitants. Approximately one third of those elected also sat on the citywide municipal council (or on the Council of Paris), and it is that citywide council that then elected the city’s mayor (as in other French communes). The arrondissement/sector council then elected its own mayor (the arrondissement/sector mayor) after the city mayoral election.

In 2025, the second PLM law, Law No. 2025-795 of 11 August 2025, was passed. It substantially modifies the municipal electoral system in Paris, Lyon and Marseille and applies for the first time at the municipal elections scheduled for March 2026. The reform replaces the earlier “single, arrondissement/sector-based” election with two simultaneous ballots: one citywide ballot to elect councillors of Paris / the municipal councillors of Lyon and Marseille, and a second ballot to elect arrondissement/sector councillors. Both ballots use a two-round proportional list system, but the majority bonus is reduced to 25% for the citywide municipal ballot (while remaining 50% for the arrondissement/sector ballot). As elsewhere in France, the mayor of the city continues to be elected indirectly by the citywide council at its first sitting following the election.

== 1982 PLM law ==
=== Election of municipal councils and arrondissement/sector councils ===
Members of the Council of Paris and the municipal councils of Marseille and Lyon are elected using a specific electoral system: each of these communes is divided into sectors (in Lyon each arrondissement constitutes a sector; in Marseille two arrondissements form a sector; in Paris, arrondissements 1, 2, 3 and 4 are grouped into one sector, and each of the other arrondissements constitutes its own sector). In each sector, an election is held according to the rules applicable to communes with more than 1,000 inhabitants—every six years, by direct universal suffrage, using party-list proportional representation with a majority bonus.

Within each sector, one third of elected members sit both on the municipal council and on the arrondissement/sector council; the others sit only on the arrondissement/sector council:

- Paris: 517 elected members across 17 sectors, including 163 members of the Council of Paris and 354 members serving only as arrondissement/sector councillors.
- Marseille: 275 elected members across 8 sectors (each comprising 2 arrondissements), including 101 municipal councillors and 174 sector-only councillors.
- Lyon: 221 elected members across 9 arrondissements, including 73 municipal councillors and 148 arrondissement-only councillors.

=== Arrondissement/sector councils ===
Map of the sectors and arrondissements of Marseille

The PLM law creates an elected arrondissement or sector council (conseil d'arrondissement ou de secteur), chaired by an elected arrondissement or sector mayor (maire d'arrondissement ou de secteur), for each municipal arrondissement (or sector) in the three cities. The arrondissement/sector council includes the municipal councillors elected in the arrondissement (or sector), as well as additional councillors in a number that varies by arrondissement (or sector), taken from the candidate lists immediately following those elected to the municipal council. The number of arrondissement/sector councillors is double the number of municipal councillors, but may not be fewer than ten or more than forty.

==== Arrondissement/sector mayor ====
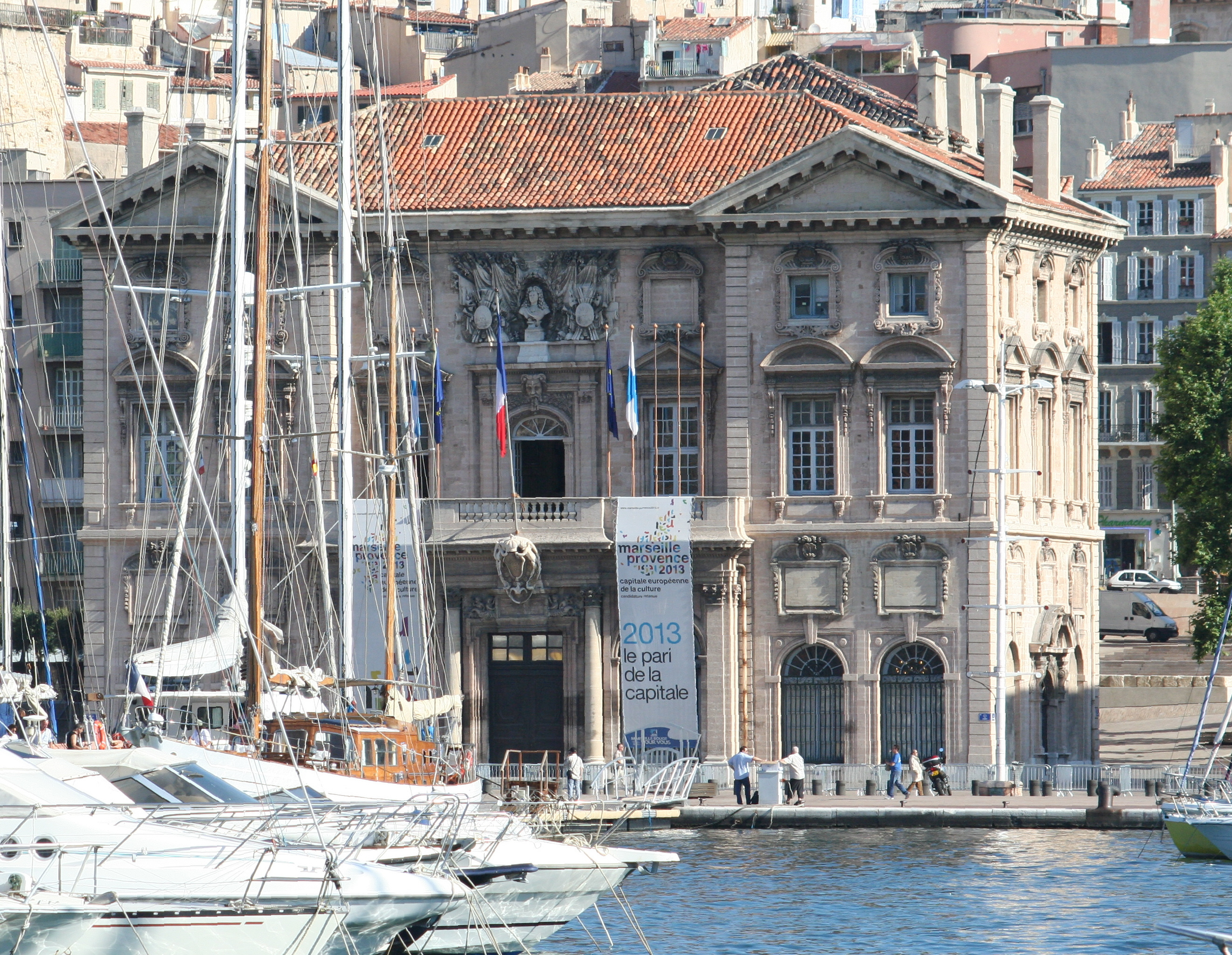
Marseille City Hall

The arrondissement/sector council is chaired by the arrondissement/sector mayor, elected from among the municipal councillors of the relevant arrondissement or sector. This election takes place eight days after the election of the mayor of the commune.

The mayor prepares and implements the deliberations of the arrondissement/sector council. The mayor authorises expenditure and receipts within the arrondissement/sector budget framework. Deputy mayors of arrondissement/sectors are elected under the same conditions as the arrondissement/sector mayor and may receive delegated responsibilities.

The arrondissement/sector mayor and their deputies serve as civil registry officers and are responsible within the arrondissement/sector for the functions that fall to the commune’s mayor in matters of civil registration, school affairs linked to the enforcement of compulsory education, and responsibilities under the National Service Code.

The arrondissement/sector mayor chairs the arrondissement school fund (caisse des écoles) and gives opinions on planning authorisations (building permits, etc.) and road occupation permissions issued by the mayor of the commune in the commune’s name. The mayor is also consulted on proposed acquisitions or sales of buildings planned by the commune within the arrondissement or sector, as well as on declarations submitted by owners under the right of first refusal (droit de préemption urbain).

==== Powers of arrondissement/sector councils ====
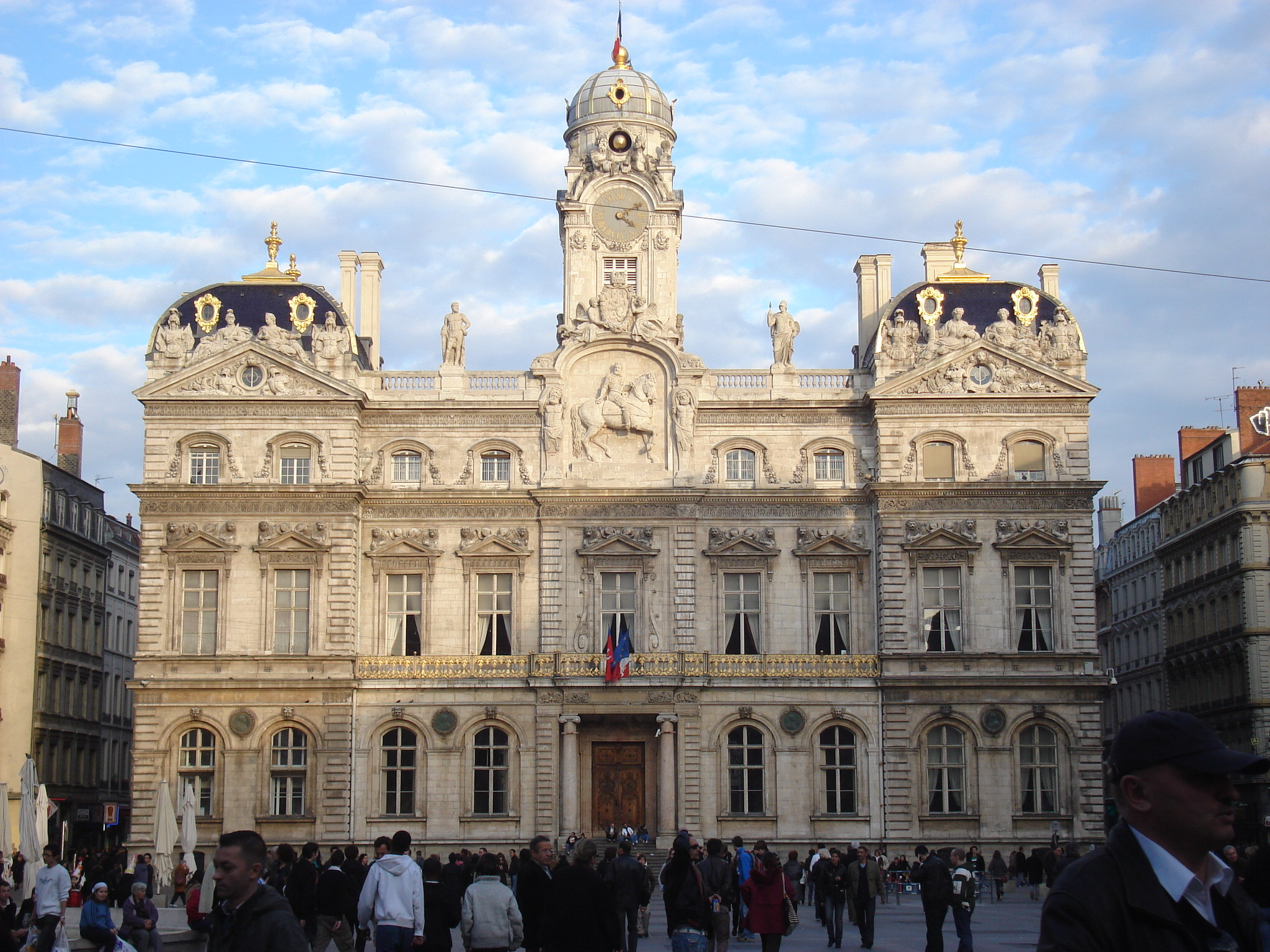
Lyon City Hall

As noted above, the arrondissement/sector council elects the arrondissement/sector mayor from among the members of the municipal council, using the same procedures as the election of commune mayors.

The arrondissement/sector council:

- allocates operating funds delegated to it by the municipal council within a budget document called the special arrondissement statement (État spécial d'arrondissement), which is annexed to the commune’s budget; it also votes on investment appropriations;
- deliberates on the location and development programme of all social facilities intended for arrondissement/sector residents, where implementation is subject to a municipal council decision and where management (except in specific cases) falls to the arrondissement/sector council;
- appoints from among its members the commune’s representatives in arrondissement/sector bodies where the commune must be represented;
- is asked for opinions on reports and projects concerning matters whose execution is planned in whole or in part within the arrondissement/sector boundaries;
- is consulted by the commune mayor before any municipal council deliberation on the Local urban plan (Plan General de Ordenación Urbana) and on all planning projects when the plan or project concerns the arrondissement;
- is consulted by the municipal council on the amount of subsidies the council proposes to grant to associations active in the arrondissement or sector;
- may be delegated management of a municipal service facility by the municipal council.

The arrondissement/sector council may submit written questions to the commune mayor or request a debate in the municipal council on any matter affecting the arrondissement or sector.

Meetings of arrondissement/sector councils are public.

==== Staff of arrondissement/sector city halls ====
To exercise these powers, the arrondissement/sector mayor has commune employees assigned to them. Authority over evaluation, promotion, or disciplinary action is exercised by the commune mayor after consultation with the arrondissement/sector mayor.

=== Special regime for Paris ===
The PLM law provides that the two local authorities established on the territory of Paris (the commune and the department) are henceforth administered by common bodies: the Mayor of Paris and the Council of Paris.

The powers of the Mayor of Paris remain limited by the specific powers of the Prefecture of Police, stemming in particular from the decree of the consuls of 12 Messidor Year VIII (1 July 1800), which set out the functions of the Prefect of Police in Paris, and by subsequent amending texts.

=== Historical references concerning the 1982 PLM law ===
==== Effect of electing the mayor by indirect universal suffrage ====
At the promulgation of the PLM law carried by Interior Minister Gaston Defferre, the sectors in Paris and Lyon followed arrondissement boundaries, while in Marseille the sectors were defined by a special division, each grouping between one and four arrondissements. Two months later, during the March 1983 municipal election in Marseille, Gaston Defferre was re-elected mayor of Marseille with fewer votes than Jean-Claude Gaudin, while nonetheless winning a majority of sectors. (Note: Marseille’s sectors were redrawn after Gaston Defferre’s death.)

In 2001, Gérard Collomb and Bertrand Delanoë became mayors of Lyon and Paris for the first time in similar circumstances, as did Anne Hidalgo in Paris in 2020, and—according to some—also in 2014. (Note: Where Collomb’s and Delanoë’s lists faced divided right-wing lists in some arrondissements, adding together right-wing list scores does not change the final result; the two-tier voting system enabled their victories, not merely vote-splitting in three-way races. Likewise for Anne Hidalgo’s 2014 election.)

Thus, the electoral system used to elect the mayors of Paris, Lyon and Marseille can result in the election of a mayor who is in the minority in the popular vote, a phenomenon also observed with the indirect system used to elect the President of the United States, which has on several occasions produced presidents without a popular-vote majority.

Although it has never happened, it is theoretically possible for a mayor to be elected while being in the minority both in votes and in sectors won. For example, in Paris in 2020, a candidate receiving 50.1% of the vote in head-to-head races in the 10th, 13th to 16th, and 18th to 20th arrondissements (8 sectors out of 17), and 0% in the others, would obtain 82 of the 163 seats in the Council of Paris—enough to be elected mayor—with only 31.65% of the citywide popular vote. This share could be lowered further by imagining three- or four-way races rather than head-to-head contests in those arrondissements.

This same two-round party-list proportional system with a 50% majority bonus by sector was adopted for the election of the Metropolis of Lyon council under the 2015 MAPTAM law. However, the effects of electing a majority of metropolitan councillors with a minority of votes would be far more problematic than for municipal elections in Paris, Marseille and Lyon, given that the metropolitan level now holds nearly all powers in the Lyon urban area.

==== Legal workaround of the Electoral Code in Lyon ====
While he could have only been a candidate in only one arrondissement of Lyon, Louis Pradel came up with the idea during the 1965 municipal election of having all of his running-mates join an association called “P.R.A.D.E.L.” (Pour la Réalisation Active Des Espérances Lyonnaises) and including on ballot papers used in each of the city’s nine arrondissements the wording “Liste P.R.A.D.E.L.” (the Electoral Code preventing him from including his name). Voters for any of his nine lists thus knew which potential future mayor they were supporting. The strategy was so successful that Pradel won all arrondissements in the first round—thus winning all nine arrondissement town halls and the central city hall—and his four successors used the same tactic. (Note: Francisque Collomb, associated with Michel Noir, elected in 1983: “Liste F.C.O.L.L.O.M.B - M.N.O.I.R”; Michel Noir, elected in 1989: “Liste M.N.O.I.R”; Raymond Barre, elected in 1995: “Liste R.B.A.R.R.E.”, facing Gérard Collomb’s list “Liste G.C.O.L.L.O.M.B.”; Gérard Collomb, elected in 2001: “Liste G.E.R.A.R.D.C.O.L.L.O.M.B.”; in 2008, Dominique Perben led a list titled “Liste P.E.R.B.E.N.”, although by then including the lead candidate’s name on arrondissement ballots had become permissible (e.g., “Aimer Lyon avec Gérard Collomb”).)

== 2025 PLM law ==
The law modifying the rules for electing the mayors of Paris, Lyon and Marseille was assented to on 11 August 2025 and published in the Journal officiel on 12 August 2025. The new law will apply for the first time at the municipal elections scheduled for March 2026. The 2025 law introduces two separate elections held at the same time. Voters therefore vote on the same day both to elect arrondissement/sector councillors and to elect municipal councillors for the commune as a whole. These elections use a two-round party-list proportional representation system. For the municipal election only, the new law reduces the majority bonus for the list finishing first in the first or second round to 25% (compared with 50% in other French communes and in arrondissements/sectors).

An article was added by MPs to codify the Paris City Hall practice of regularly convening arrondissement mayors to discuss topics of their choosing, and to extend this possibility to Lyon and Marseille. The General Code of Territorial Collectivities was therefore amended to provide in the three cities for a new coordination body known as the “conference of mayors” (conférence des maires).

== See also ==
- Municipal elections in France
