= Philippe Goujon =

French politician

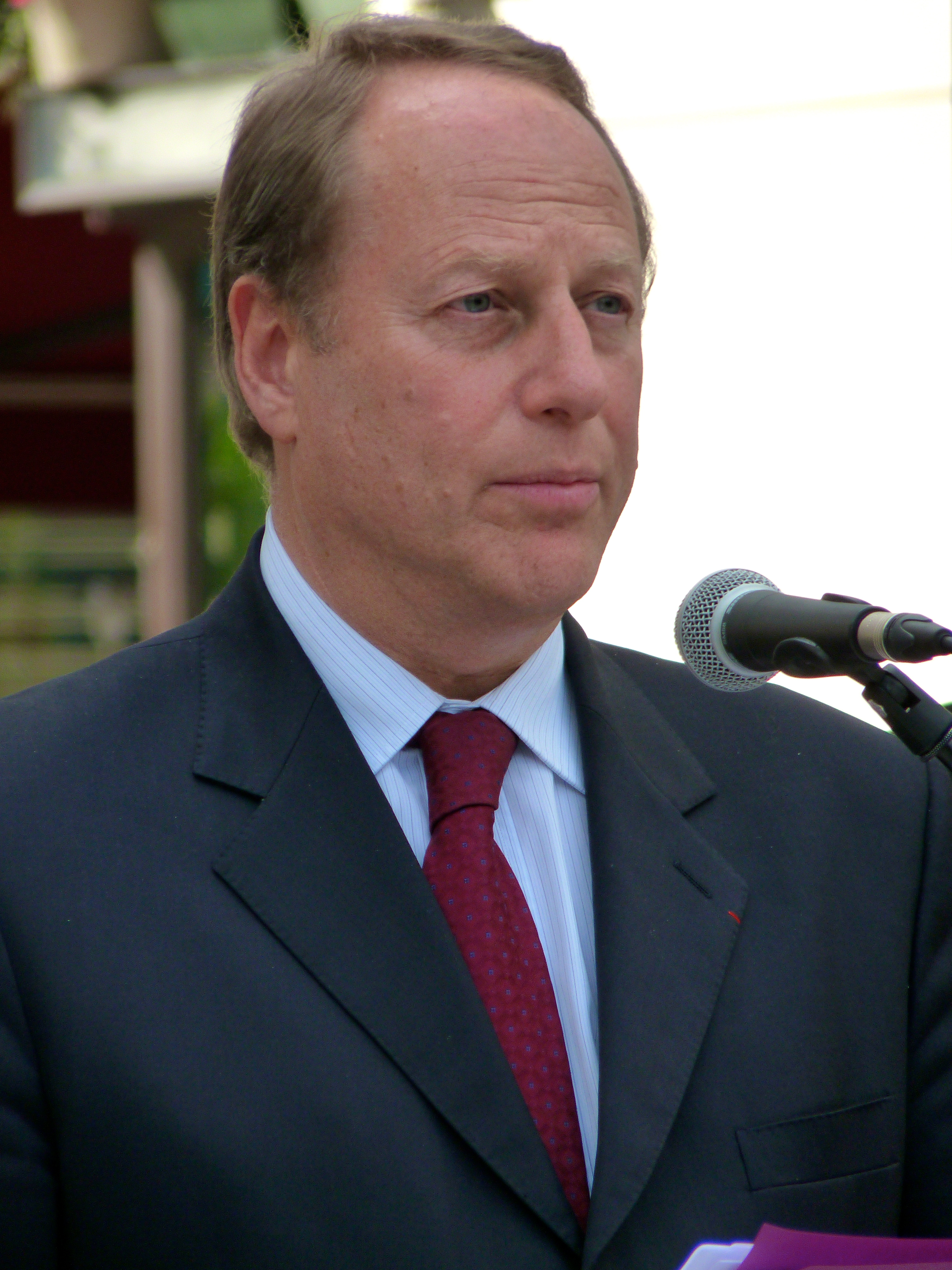

Mayor of the 15th arrondissement of Paris
- Incumbent
- Assumed office 29 March 2008
- Preceded by: René Galy-Dejean

Senator for Paris
- In office 1 October 2004 – 29 November 2007

Member of the National Assembly for Paris's 12th constituency
- In office 20 June 2007 – 20 June 2017
- Preceded by: Édouard Balladur
- Succeeded by: Olivia Grégoire
- In office 2 May 1993 – 30 June 1995
- Preceded by: Édouard Balladur
- Succeeded by: Édouard Balladur

Personal details
- Born: 30 April 1954 (age 71) Paris, France
- Party: Rally for the Republic (until 2002); Union for a Popular Movement (2002–2015); The Republicans (since 2015)
- Education: Lycée Henri-IV
- Alma mater: Sciences Po

Philippe Goujon (born 30 April 1954) is a French politician who served as the member of the National Assembly for the twelfth constituency of Paris from 1993 to 1995 and again from 2007 until 2017. A member of The Republicans, he has been Mayor of the 15th arrondissement of Paris since 2008.

== Career ==
Goujon first replaced Édouard Balladur in the National Assembly in 1993 upon his appointment as Prime Minister of France. A member of the Rally for the Republic (RPR) until 2002, he was elected to the Senate in the 2004 election for the Union for a Popular Movement (UMP), before returning to the National Assembly for two full terms after Balladur's retirement from politics in 2007. Goujon was defeated in the 2017 legislative election by Olivia Grégoire, running for La République En Marche! (LREM).

Elected Mayor of the 15th arrondissement of Paris in the 2008 municipal election and reelected in 2014, he lost his party's renomination in 2020 to Agnès Evren. Although she beat him in the first round of the election after he chose to run nevertheless as an Independent with the support of the Democratic Movement (MoDem) and Agir, they both advanced to the second round before a policy agreement was reached which would let Goujon remain in office for a third term while Evren would withdraw her candidacy and continue as a Member of the European Parliament (MEP).
