= Jeanne d'Hauteserre =

French politician

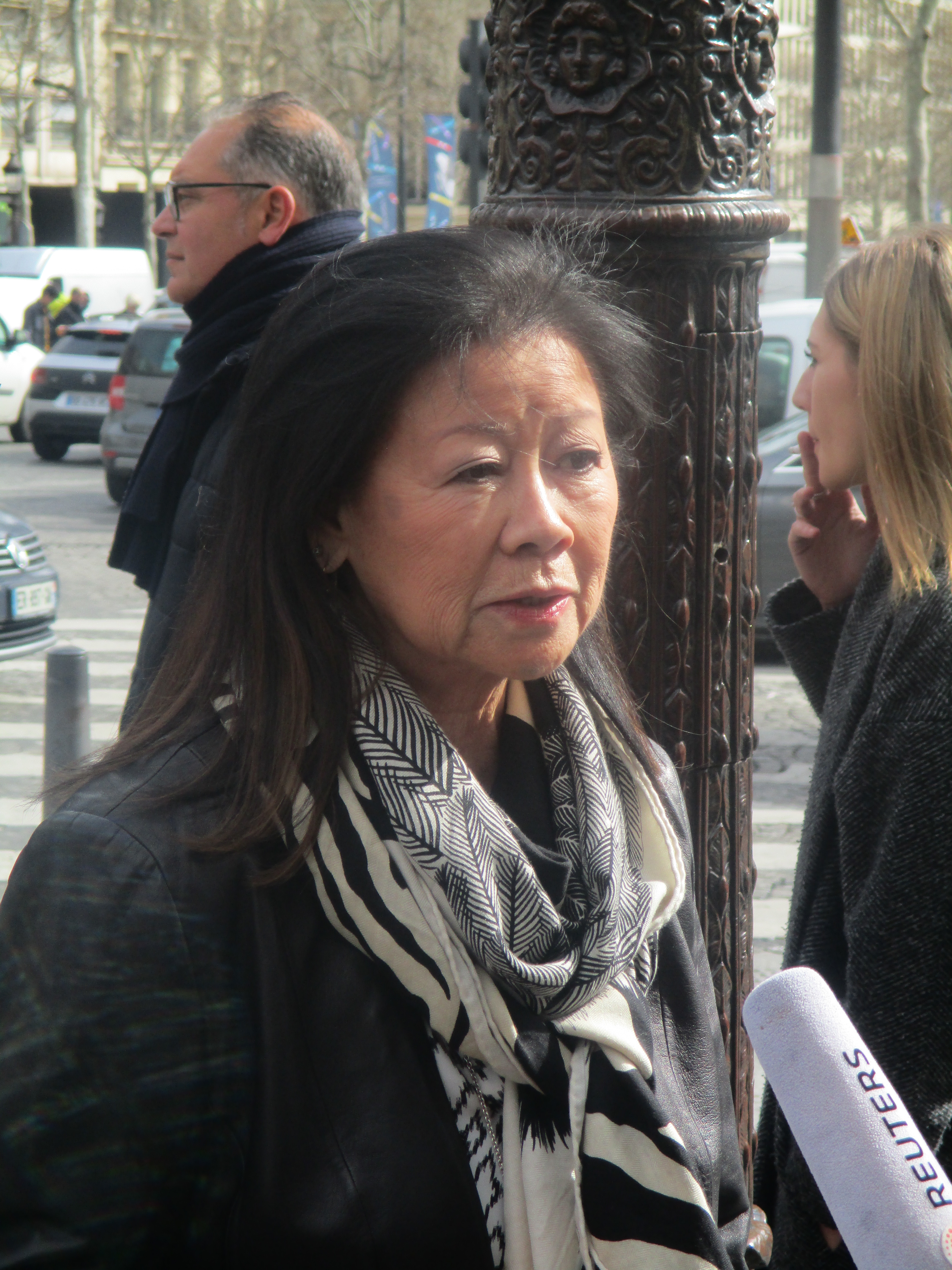
- The mayor of the 8th arrondissement of Paris, Jeanne d'Hauteserre, interviewed by the Reuters agency two days after the yellow vest demonstration of March 16, 2019, which caused damage on the Avenue des Champs-Élysées. from French

Mayor of the 8th arrondissement of Paris
- Incumbent
- Assumed office 13 April 2014
- Preceded by: François Lebel

Personal details
- Born: 28 July 1953 (age 72) Haiphong, State of Vietnam (French Union, Indochinese Federation)
- Party: The Republicans

Jeanne d'Hauteserre (born 28 July 1953) is a French politician of the Republicans (LR) who served as the current mayor of the 8th arrondissement of Paris from 2014 to 2026.

Ahead of the Republicans' 2016 presidential primary, d'Hauteserre endorsed Nicolas Sarkozy as the party's candidate for the 2017 French presidential election.

== Personal life ==
D'Hauteserre was born in Haiphong, in the State of Vietnam (then an associated state of the French Union and a member of the Indochinese Federation) to a French military doctor father and a mother from Guangzhou, China. She arrived in France during the Vietnam War.
