= Geoffroy Boulard =

French politician

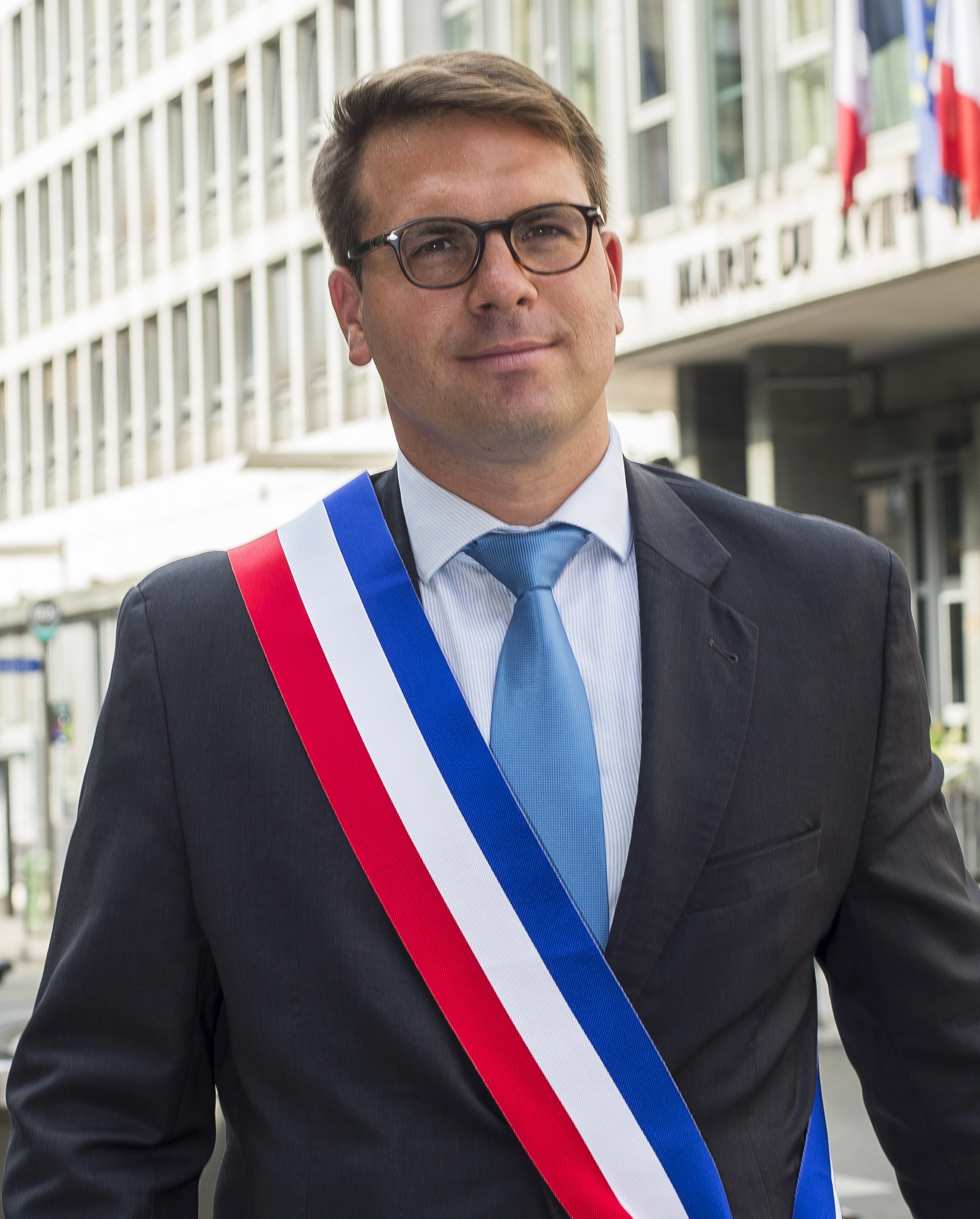

Mayor of the 17th arrondissement of Paris
- Incumbent
- Assumed office 11 July 2017
- Preceded by: Brigitte Kuster

Councillor of Paris
- Incumbent
- Assumed office 30 March 2014
- Mayor: Anne Hidalgo

Personal details
- Born: 3 December 1978 (age 47) Rouen, France
- Party: The Republicans

Geoffroy Boulard (born 3 December 1978) is a French politician. A member of The Republicans, he has served as a councillor of Paris since 2014, and mayor of the 17th arrondissement of Paris since 2017. Since 2020, he has been the vice-president in charge of communication, innovation and digital technology for Grand Paris.

== Political Career ==
=== Deputy Mayor and then First Deputy Mayor of the 17th Arrondissement of Paris ===
Elected on the right-wing and center-right coalition list in the 17th arrondissement, led by Françoise de Panafieu, during the 2008 Paris municipal elections, he became Deputy Mayor to Brigitte Kuster, responsible for commerce, crafts, and economic development, until October 2011.

=== Rat Control ===
In 2018, Boulard launched a mobbile website signalerunrat.paris, a crowdsourced map of rats in the 17th arrondisement of Paris. The goal was to collect and report all rodent sightings to the Paris City Hall. Within 24 hours, the site received over 700 reports and more than 6,500 unique visitors. The website was reported internationally. In September 2018, he travelled to New York for two days to learn about rat control methods.
