= Carine Petit =

French politician (born 1974)

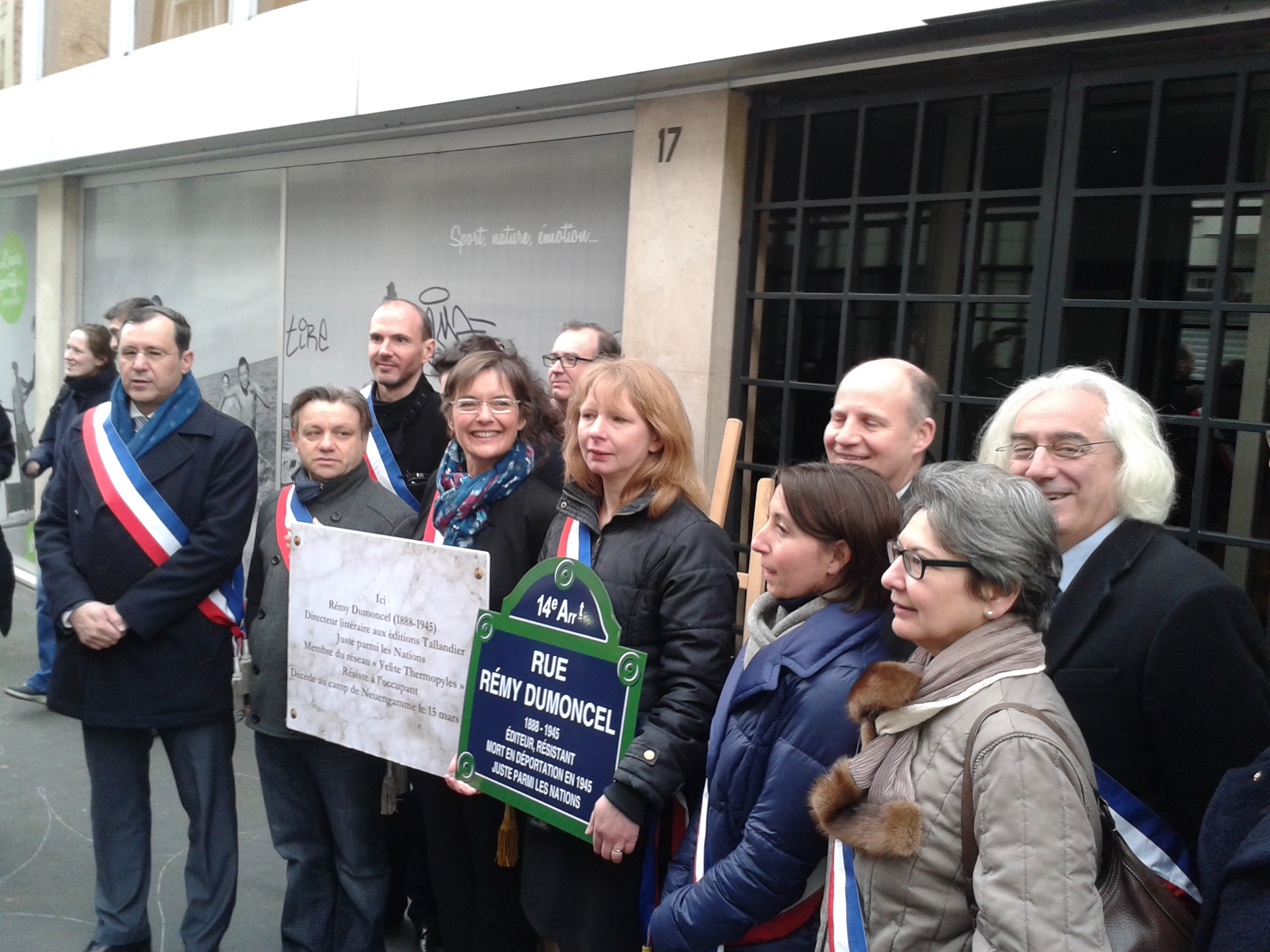
- Petit in 2015

Mayor of the 14th arrondissement of Paris
- Incumbent
- Assumed office 13 April 2014
- Preceded by: Pascal Cherki

Personal details
- Born: 26 June 1974 (age 51)
- Party: The Ecologists (since 2022)
- Other political affiliations: Socialist Party (until 2017); Génération.s (2017–2022)

Carine Petit (born 26 June 1974) is a French politician of The Ecologists. Since 2014, she has served as mayor of the 14th arrondissement of Paris. She has been a member of the Council of Paris since 2014, and a member of the metropolitan council of Grand Paris since 2015. She was a member of the Socialist Party until 2017, when she switched to Génération.s. In 2022, she switched to The Ecologists.
