= Éric Pliez =

French politician (born 1956)

- Pliez at Paris Pride 2026

Mayor of the 20th arrondissement of Paris
- Incumbent
- Assumed office 11 July 2020
- Preceded by: Frédérique Calandra

Councillor of Paris
- Incumbent
- Assumed office 3 July 2020
- Constituency: 20th arrondissement

Personal details
- Born: Éric Jean-Marc Pliez; 17 October 1956 (age 69) Conflans-Sainte-Honorine, France
- Party: Place Publique

Éric Jean-Marc Pliez (French pronunciation: [eʁik plije]; born 17 October 1956) is a French politician. Since 2020, he has served as mayor of the 20th arrondissement of Paris.

He served as president of the charity Aurore from 2001 to 2020, and was elected president of Paris Habitat in 2020. From 2013 to 2019, Pliez also served as president of the SAMU Social of Paris. In the 2014 and 2019 European Parliament elections, he was a candidate for member of the European Parliament. He has been a member of the Council of Paris and the metropolitan council of Grand Paris since 2020.

== Honours ==
- Officer of the Legion of Honour (2019)
