= List of senators of Paris =

Location of Paris in France

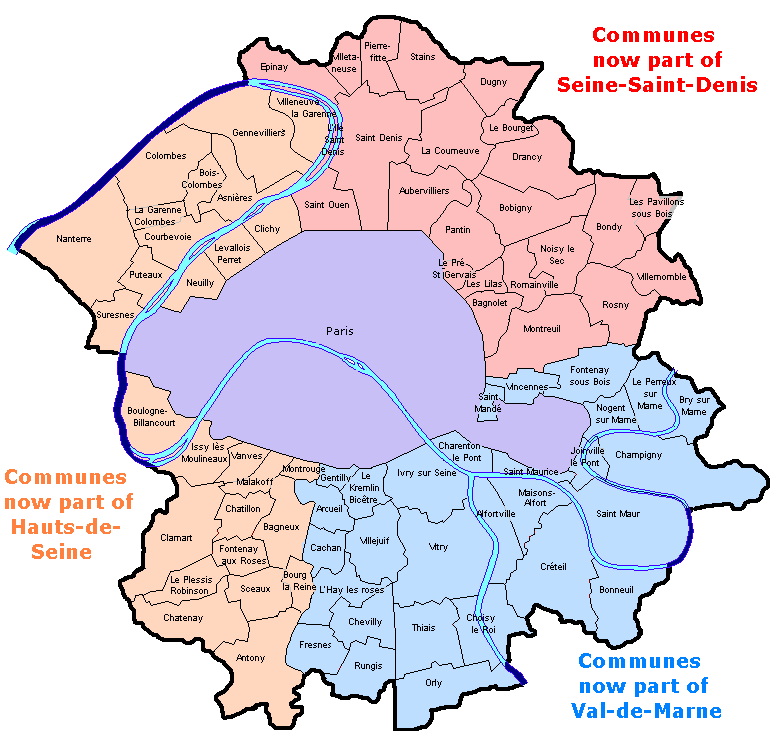
Paris (center) in the 1968 break-up of the Seine department

Following is a list of senators of Paris, people who have represented the department of Paris in the Senate of France. The department was created from the central part of the Seine department in 1968.

== 1968–1977 ==
Senators for Paris between 1968 and 1977:

| Name | Party | Elected | Notes |
|---|---|---|---|
| Jean Legaret | Independent Republicans Group (RI) | 1968 | Died 16 February 1976 |
| Janine Alexandre-Debray | Rally for the Republic (RPR) | 1976 | From 17 February 1976, replacing Jean Legaret |
| Albert Chavanac | Union of Democrats for the Republic (UDR) | 1968 | Died 14 September 1972 |
| Jean Auburtin | Union of Democrats for the Republic (UDR) | 1972 | From 15 September 1972, replacing Albert Chavanac |
| Maurice Bayrou | Union of Democrats for the Republic (UDR) | 1968 | |
| Raymond Bossus | French Communist Party (PCF) | 1968 | Resigned 25 June 1969 |
| Serge Boucheny | French Communist Party (PCF) | 1969 | From 26 June 1969, replacing Raymond Bossus |
| Georges Cogniot | French Communist Party (PCF) | 1968 | |
| Pierre Giraud (senator) | French Communist Party (PCF) | 1968 | |
| Raymond Guyot | French Communist Party (PCF) | 1968 | |
| Catherine Lagatu | French Communist Party (PCF) | 1968 | |
| Paul Minot | Union of Democrats for the Republic (UDR) | 1968 | |
| Dominique Pado | Union of Democrats for the Republic (UDR) | 1968 | |
| Pierre-Christian Taittinger | Independent Republicans Group (RI) | 1968 | Appointed to cabinet 12 February 1976 |
| Jacques Sanglier | Rally for the Republic (RPR) | 1976 | From 12 February 1976, replacing Pierre-Christian Taittinger |
| Jean-Louis Vigier | Union of Democrats for the Republic (UDR) | 1959 | |

== 1977 – 1986 ==
Senators for Paris between 1977 and 1986:

| Name | Party | Elected | Notes |
|---|---|---|---|
| Serge Boucheny | French Communist Party (PCF) | 1977 | |
| Raymond Bourgine | Rally for the Republic (RPR) | 1977 | |
| Michel Caldaguès | Rally for the Republic (RPR) | 1977 | |
| Jean Chérioux | Rally for the Republic (RPR) | 1977 | |
| Jean-Louis Vigier | Rally for the Republic (RPR) | 1977 | Resigned 3 October 1980 |
| François Collet | Rally for the Republic (RPR) | 1980 | From 4 October 1980, replacing Jean-Louis Vigier |
| Georges Dayan | Socialist Party (PS) | 1977 | Died 28 May 1979 |
| Cécile Goldet | Socialist Party (PS) | 1979 | From 29 May 1979, to replace Georges Dayan |
| Christian de La Malène | Rally for the Republic (RPR) | 1977 | |
| Dominique Pado | Rally for the Republic (RPR) | 1967 | |
| Bernard Parmantier | Socialist Party (PS) | 1977 | |
| Rolande Perlican | French Communist Party (PCF) | 1977 | |
| Roger Romani | Rally for the Republic (RPR) | 1977 | |
| Pierre-Christian Taittinger | Republican Party (PR) | 1977 | |

== 1986–1995 ==
Senators for Paris between 1986 and 1995:

| Name | Party | Elected | Notes |
|---|---|---|---|
| François Collet | Rally for the Republic (RPR) | 1993 | Died 27 September 1994 |
| Magdeleine Anglade | Rally for the Republic (RPR) | 1994 | From 28 September 1994, by-election to replace François Collet |
| Raymond Bourgine | Rally for the Republic (RPR) | 1986 | Died 29 November 1990 |
| Camille Cabana | Rally for the Republic (RPR) | 1991 | From 10 February 1991, by-election to replace Raymond Bourgine |
| Michel Caldaguès | Rally for the Republic (RPR) | 1986 | |
| Jean Chérioux | Rally for the Republic (RPR) | 1986 | |
| Roger Chinaud | Union for French Democracy (UDF) | 1986 | |
| Maurice Couve de Murville | Rally for the Republic (RPR) | 1986 | |
| Claude Estier | Socialist Party (PS) | 1986 | |
| Philippe de Gaulle | Rally for the Republic (RPR) | 1986 | |
| Christian de La Malène | Rally for the Republic (RPR) | 1986 | |
| Dominique Pado | Centrist Union group (UC) | 1986 | Died 18 May 1989 |
| Bernard Guyomard | Rally for the Republic (RPR) | 1989 | From 19 May 1989, replacing Dominique Pado |
| Pierre-Christian Taittinger | Union for French Democracy (UDF) | 1986 | |
| Nicole de Hauteclocque | Rally for the Republic (RPR) | 1986 | Died 18 January 1993 |
| Maurice Ulrich | Rally for the Republic (RPR) | 1993 | From 18 April 1993, by-election replacing Nicole de Hauteclocque |

== 1995 – 2004 ==
Senators for Paris between 1995 and 2004:

| Name | Party | Elected | Notes |
|---|---|---|---|
| Michel Charzat | Socialist Party (PS) | 1995 | Elected deputy January 2000 |
| Jean-Yves Autexier | Citizen and Republican Movement (MRC) | 2000 | From 20 January 2000, replacing Michel Charzat |
| Nicole Borvo | French Communist Party (PCF) | 1995 | |
| Jean Chérioux | Union for a Popular Movement (UMP) | 1995 | |
| Jacques Dominati | Union for a Popular Movement (UMP) | 1995 | |
| Claude Estier | Socialist Party (PS) | 1995 | |
| Philippe de Gaulle | Union for a Popular Movement (UMP) | 1995 | |
| Christian de La Malène | Union for a Popular Movement (UMP) | 1995 | |
| Bertrand Delanoë | Socialist Party (PS) | 1995 | Resigned March 2001 |
| Jean-Yves Mano | Socialist Party (PS) | 2001 | From 28 March 2001, replacing Bertrand Delanoë |
| Bernard Plasait | Union for a Popular Movement (UMP) | 1995 | |
| Danièle Pourtaud | Socialist Party (PS) | 1995 | |
| Michel Caldaguès | Rally for the Republic (RPR) | 1995 | Reigned September 2002 |
| Roger Romani | Union for a Popular Movement (UMP) | 2002 | From 1 October 2002, replacing Michel Caldaguès |
| Maurice Ulrich | Union for a Popular Movement (UMP) | 1995 | |

== 2004–2011 ==
Senators for Paris between 2004 and 2011:

| Name | Party | Elected | Notes |
|---|---|---|---|
| David Assouline | Socialist Party (PS) | 2004 | |
| Nicole Borvo | French Communist Party (PCF) | 2004 | |
| Alima Boumediene-Thiery | Europe Ecology – The Greens (EELV) | 2004 | |
| Jean-Pierre Caffet | Socialist Party (PS) | 2004 | |
| Jean Desessard | Europe Ecology – The Greens (EELV) | 2004 | |
| Philippe Dominati | Union for a Popular Movement (UMP) | 2004 | |
| Philippe Goujon | Union for a Popular Movement (UMP) | 2004 | Elected deputy in November 2007 |
| Catherine Dumas | Union for a Popular Movement (UMP) | 2007 | From 30 November 2007, replacing Philippe Goujon |
| Marie-Thérèse Hermange | Union for a Popular Movement (UMP) | 2004 | |
| Bariza Khiari | Socialist Party (PS) | 2004 | |
| Roger Madec | Socialist Party (PS) | 2004 | |
| Yves Pozzo di Borgo | New Centre (NC) | 2004 | |
| Roger Romani | Union for a Popular Movement (UMP) | 2004 | |

== 2011–2017 ==
Senators for Paris between 2011 and 2017:

| Name | Party | Elected | Notes |
|---|---|---|---|
| Leila Aïchi | Europe Ecology – The Greens (EELV) | 2011 | |
| David Assouline | Socialist Party (PS) | 2011 | |
| Nicole Borvo | Communist, Republican, Citizen and Ecologist group | 2011 | Resigned 19 September 2012 |
| Pierre Laurent | French Communist Party (PCF) | 2012 | From 20 September 2012, replacing Nicole Borvo |
| Jean-Pierre Caffet | Socialist Party (PS) | 2011 | |
| Pierre Charon | Union for a Popular Movement (UMP) | 2011 | |
| Jean Desessard | Europe Ecology – The Greens (EELV) | 2011 | |
| Philippe Dominati | Union for a Popular Movement (UMP) | 2011 | |
| Chantal Jouanno | Union of Democrats and Independents (UDI) | 2011 | |
| Bariza Khiari | Socialist Party (PS) | 2011 | |
| Marie-Noëlle Lienemann | Socialist Party (PS) | 2011 | |
| Roger Madec | Socialist Party (PS) | 2011 | |
| Yves Pozzo di Borgo | New Centrists (NC) | 2011 | |

== From 2017 ==
Senators for Paris from 2017:

| Name | Group | Elected | Notes |
|---|---|---|---|
| David Assouline | Socialiste et républicain | 2017 | |
| Julien Bargeton | La République En Marche | 2017 | |
| Esther Benbassa | Communist, Republican, Citizen and Ecologist group | 2017 | |
| Céline Boulay-Espéronnier | Les Républicains | 2017 | |
| Pierre Charon | Les Républicains | 2017 | |
| Philippe Dominati | Les Républicains | 2017 | |
| Catherine Dumas | Les Républicains | 2017 | |
| Rémi Féraud | Socialiste et républicain | 2017 | |
| Marie-Pierre de la Gontrie | Socialiste et républicain | 2017 | |
| Bernard Jomier | Socialiste et républicain | 2017 | |
| Pierre Laurent | Communist, Republican, Citizen and Ecologist group | 2017 | |
| Marie-Noëlle Lienemann | Socialiste et républicain | 2017 | |

== Sources ==
- Liste des anciens sénateurs de la Vème République par circonscription (in French), Sénat de France
- Liste par département – Paris (in French), Sénat de France
