= Equitax =

Term that describes taxes over equestrian activities in France

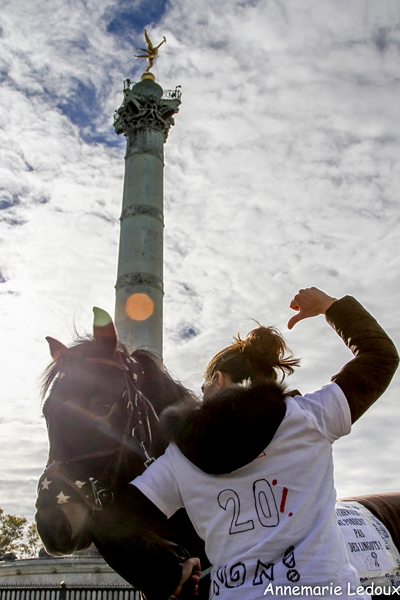
Demonstration against the equitax on November 11, 2013 in Paris.

Equitax (Équitaxe or Équi-taxe) is the term used to describe the attempt to move equestrian activities in France from a reduced VAT rate to the standard rate, i.e. from 7% to 20%. The European Union and France are at loggerheads, as France has been applying reduced VAT rates to several equestrian activities since 2004. In January 2013, VAT on the sale of horses was raised to the standard rate. At the end of 2013, Jean-Marc Ayrault's second government proposed that the entire equestrian sector be brought under the standard VAT rate. The amendment was passed by the National Assembly on the night of October 22, then published in the Journal Officiel de la République française on November 13, with implementation scheduled for January 2014 under the authority of the Minister of Agriculture, Food and Forestry, Stéphane Le Foll, and the Minister Delegate for the Budget, Bernard Cazeneuve.

The government says it has been forced to implement this measure by the E.U. and does not support it, as do many elected representatives from all sides of the political spectrum. A hundred MEPs believe horse-riding is a French cultural exception and the use of sports facilities, and can continue to benefit from a reduced rate. The announcement of this future VAT increase has provoked strong reactions from the equestrian community and horse professionals in France. They demonstrated in most major cities, including Paris on November 24, with ponies. They are demanding the repeal of the decree, supported by their official institutions. The Fédération nationale du cheval (FNC) and the Fédération française d'équitation (FFE) are actively lobbying. A French delegation travels to Brussels on December 13, but the European Commission states that an overall reduced rate for equestrian activities is not possible. On January 1, 2014, VAT in the equestrian sector was switched to the standard rate. After various European negotiations, on January 31, 2014, reduced-rate VAT exceptions were created for the sports sector, including the use of equestrian center buildings.

Critics point to the corporatist aspect of the anti-equitax protests, in particular the desire of horse professionals to preserve their “privileges” in a difficult economic context. A year after the introduction of the modified equitax, in January 2015, the French equestrian sector is in recession. A decline in the number of licensees and breeders, and an increase in horse abandonment, have been noted. While VAT is cited as the reason, other factors are also at play, in particular the reform of school rhythms.

On October 26, 2023, Bruno Le Maire, French Minister of the Economy, announced that the VAT rate on equestrian center activities would be reduced to 5.5% from January 1, 2024.

== Name and symbols ==
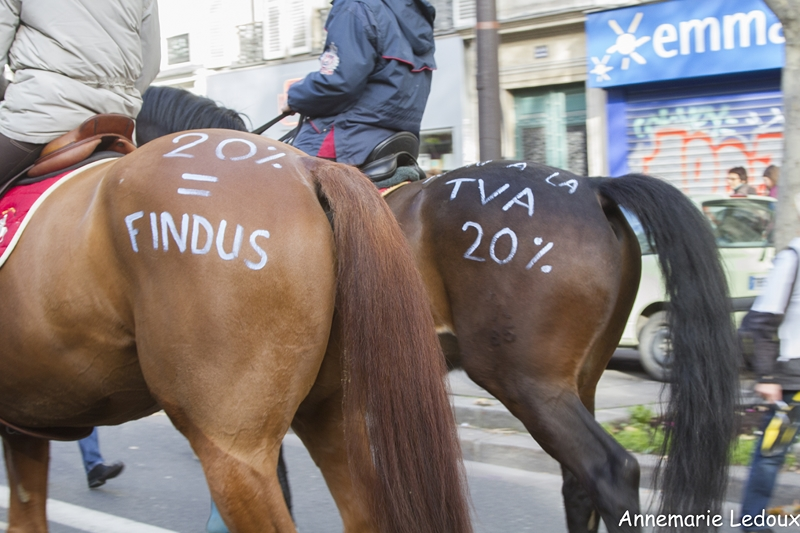
Riders during the anti-equitax demonstration on November 11 in Paris.

The name “equitax” is not official. It was adopted spontaneously by the equestrian community and journalists. The name was chosen by analogy with the heavy goods vehicle tax, nicknamed the “ecotax,” which raised controversy at the same time (and also affected horse professionals when transporting their Equidae). The “La Horde française” collective adopted a horse wearing a red bonnet as its logo, about the Bonnets Rouges movement in Brittany, which was opposed to the ecotax. Some equestrian center managers, notably in Loire-Atlantique, have chosen this symbol to cap their ponies. Other demonstrators, in Périgueux and elsewhere, wear red helmets.

== Context ==
Several foreign journalists, including Kim Willsher for The Guardian, see the anti-equitax demonstrations as part of a wave of French protests against fiscal pressure, which started in Brittany with the Bonnets Rouges movement.

The anti-equitax protests were not the only ones in France at the end of 2013; in addition to the Bonnets rouges movement, teachers of preparatory classes for the grandes écoles, school principals, and some craftsmen and tradesmen (the “Sacrificed” campaign) were protesting against taxes, their workload, or the number of their salaries, deemed too low. The movement against the VAT increase for equestrian centers takes place in a context where demands are breaking away from political parties and trade unions, notably through the use of social networks. With the VAT rate in France rising from 19.6% to 20%, with increases in certain sectors of activity, the political majority feared a tax slingshot for January 1, 2014.

Interviewed on France 3 about the equitax, David Boéri mentions the very particular situation of horse riding in France, which unlike other sports is not taught mainly by associations, but by small private companies. Changing the status of riding schools to that of associations would prevent them from making any commercial profit. These private riding schools are self-financing and are not subsidized. According to legal expert Nicolas Masson, they made around 5% in 2013. The spokesman for the “Equitation in Peril” collective estimates this margin at 7%.

== History ==
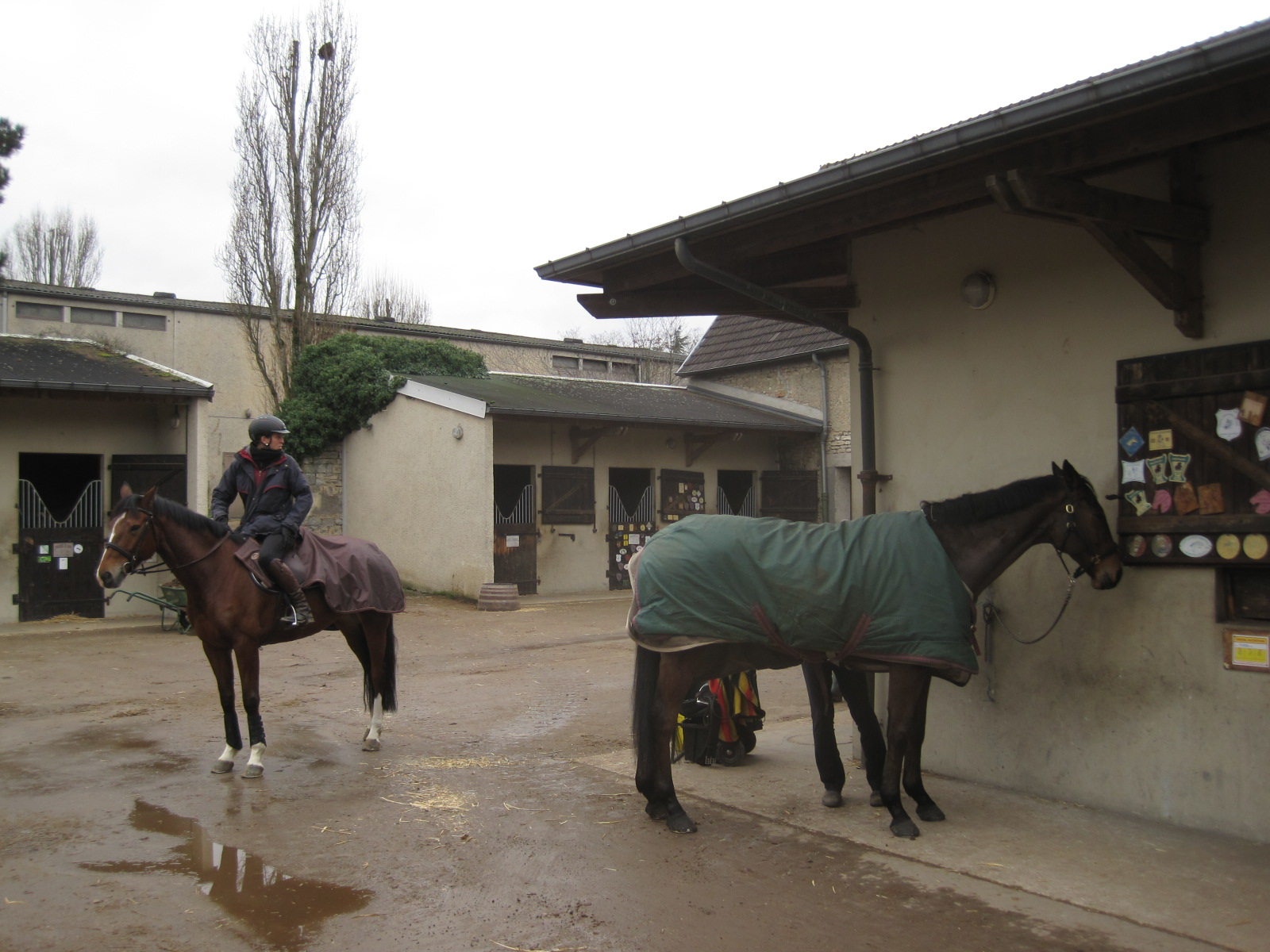
Equestrian centers are particularly concerned by equitaxes.

The introduction of the “equitax” is the result of a long-running dispute between the French government and the European Union over the equestrian industry. According to the President of the French Riding Federation, the teaching of horseback riding in France represents a European exception: this sporting pastime has become highly democratized, taking its place among the mass sports leisures, unlike in other European countries where horseback riding is more traditional or elitist. In the 1980s, riding was still a military activity reserved for a minority. Private initiatives led to the creation of riding schools whose activities were part agriculture, part sport, and part business. In 2005, they were granted farmer status. Between 2005 and 2011, according to the Groupement Hippique National, a thousand jobs were created annually in the equestrian sector thanks to the introduction of a reduced VAT rate. The breeding of racehorses and sport horses then benefited from a tax allowance costing €2 million in revenue to the State, making it look like a tax exemption. This advantage was abolished in 2011.

The European Union relies on the legal basis provided by articles 96 to 99 of the VAT directive. It is calling for all equestrian activities to be subject to the standard VAT rate, except for those involving the human consumption of horsemeat. France is not the only country concerned, as Germany, the Netherlands, and Ireland have also been called to order by the EU regarding their equestrian sectors. Austria, Italy, Luxembourg, and the Czech Republic have, like the previous countries, changed their horse tax rules to comply with European legislation.

On March 8, 2012, a few months after the Netherlands, France was fined by the Court of Justice of the European Union (CJEU) for the reduced taxation it applied to sales of Equidae intended for sport or leisure. The government announced that a return to the normal VAT rate on equine transactions is to be applied at the request of the European Commission in Brussels, leading to an initial protest movement, the “Insurgents Campaign,” as well as concern in the equestrian world from December 2012. In the equestrian sports sector, Jérôme Cahuzac is studying the issue of small owners. A drop of 1,500 racehorses in training is expected.

In January 2013, the VAT rate was raised to the standard rate on equine transactions and winnings in equestrian sports, but equestrian activities (notably those of riding schools) remain at the reduced rate, which rises from 5.5% to 7%. In August 2013, the French government announced that this rate would be raised by three points to the intermediate level (i.e. 10%) in January 2014.

Date	Event
1 January 2005	France recognizes all equestrian and horse-related activities (except for entertainment) as part of the agricultural sector, allowing them to benefit from a reduced VAT rate of 5.5%.
27 October 2007	The European Commission informs France that applying a reduced VAT rate to transactions involving horses not intended for consumption or agricultural services is not permissible.
22 January 2008	France responds that the horse is an agricultural animal that can be used in food production.
19 February 2008	France maintains the reduced VAT rate on equine transactions. The European Commission takes the case to the Court of Justice. Ireland supports France in this legal process.
1 December 2008	France receives a notice of infringement from the European Commission and has two months to comply with EU tax regulations.
16 December 2010	The European Commission initiates infringement proceedings.
8 March 2012	France is condemned by the Court of Justice of the European Union.
22 June 2012	The European Commission requests that France apply the full VAT rate to horse sales and riding lessons.
1 January 2013	The VAT rate on horse transactions in France increases to the full rate, while riding lessons and boarding fees rise from 5.5% to 7%.

== Implementation and adjustments ==
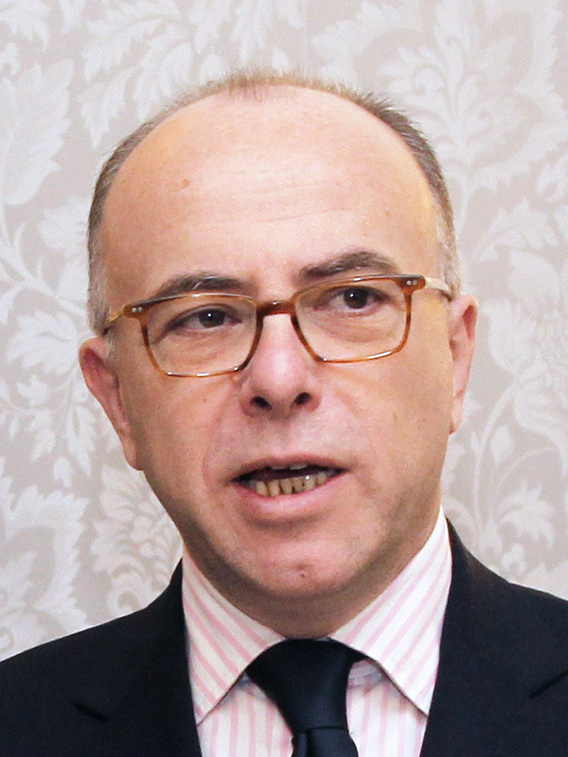
Budget Minister Bernard Cazeneuve (PS) proposed the equitax to the National Assembly.

While riding schools should theoretically have had another year to join the standard VAT rate, on October 22, 2013, an amendment was proposed to the National Assembly by Bernard Cazeneuve to raise the VAT applicable to the equestrian sector by 13 points from January 2014, i.e. from 7% to 20%. The vote passed with just a few MPs present, at 5 a.m., despite the opposing opinions of two MPs, Hervé Mariton (UMP) and Charles de Courson (UDI). This amendment nicknamed the “equitax,” provoked reactions from the equestrian community and official representatives of the industry, who feared job losses, the closure of riding schools, and the scrapping of horses.

=== Publication of the decree and announcement of the “horse fund" ===
On November 13, 2013, despite the initial protests, the government published the official decree repealing the reduced VAT on equestrian activities. On the same day, Pierre Moscovici announced several adjustments, including the possibility that contracts concluded before December 31, 2013, could continue at the same VAT rate until they expire. He proposed the creation of a “horse fund” to help professionals, particularly riding schools, absorb the VAT increase. He also believes that the tax credit for competitiveness and employment (CICE), from which they already benefit, will offset the effect. The following day, despite a blockade operation at Vincennes by angry riders, he declared on RTL that the government would not go back on the VAT hike in the sectors concerned for January 2014.

=== Questioning the European injunction ===
Although Jean-Marc Ayrault's government has announced that the VAT increase to 20% is necessary to avoid further European condemnation, this view is not shared by all politicians. Around a hundred MEPs (including former sports minister Chantal Jouanno and ecologist senator Jean-Vincent Placé) sent a letter to Prime Minister Jean-Marc Ayrault on November 15, arguing that measures could be taken at the European level to avoid the increase. MP Sophie Auconie received a response from the European Commission concerning the right to use sports facilities, including equestrian facilities, which are eligible for the reduced VAT rate. This concerns points 13 and 14 of Annex III of the current European Directive (2006). This European law was reiterated by Mr. Šemeta on October 25, 2011.

Several equestrian collectives and specialists in equine law, in particular “Équitation en péril,” believe that the government is not under threat of imminent European condemnation for breach upon breach and that the dispute only concerned horse transactions and the equestrian sports sector, not teaching in riding schools. One of its spokesmen, Loïc Caudal, claims to have received confirmation of this from Brussels. What's more, maintaining a reduced rate would theoretically be possible if Europe recognized French horse riding as a cultural exception.

=== November 22 press release ===
On November 22, following several other demonstrations and snail operations by professional and amateur riders across France, Budget Minister Bernard Cazeneuve asserted that the government “will fight within the framework of the VAT directive to reintroduce riding schools into the reduced rate scheme.” Sports Minister Valérie Fourneyron talks of “activating all levers,” and “revising this (European) VAT directive.” Agriculture Minister Stéphane Le Foll promises to visit Brussels the following week to defend the French equestrian industry. Valérie Fourneyron, on the other hand, believes that a revision of the European directive is impossible in such a short space of time and that the government will have to limit the impact of the increase.

=== Amendment to the 2014 Finance Bill by the Senate ===
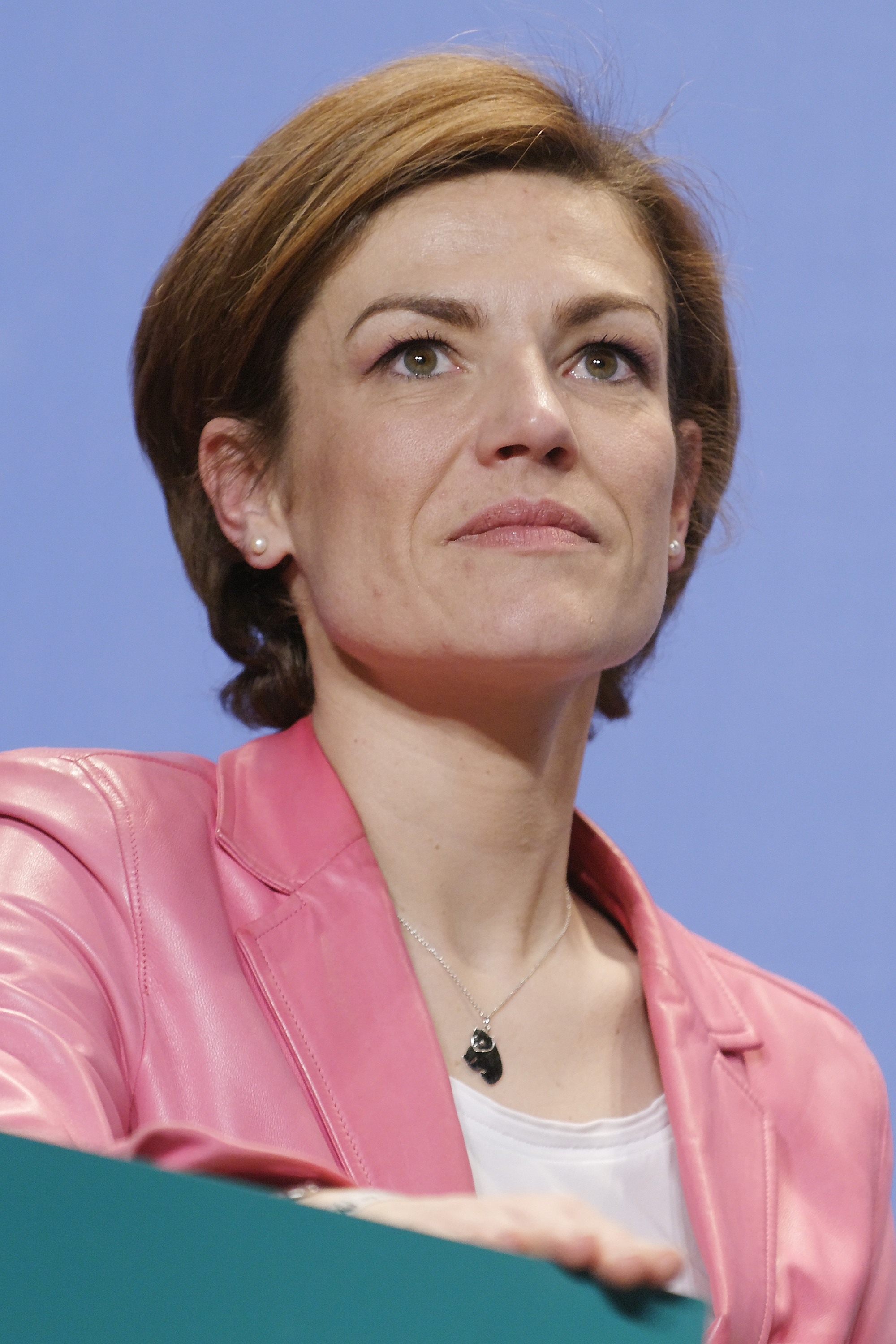
Chantal Jouanno (UMP) is one of the political figures opposed to the equitax.

Chantal Jouanno had an amendment to the 2014 Finance Bill adopted by the Senate, restoring the reduced rate of 5.5% for “services corresponding exclusively to the right to use equestrian facilities used for physical and sporting activities,” during the night of November 23. Although “unlikely to hold up in front of the National Assembly,” it testifies to “the strength of this usually discreet industry.” Following this announcement, the mobilization of riders was stepped up, in the hope that the National Assembly would adopt this amendment.

On November 27, 2013, the senators of the Horse section called for a consultation with the government, believing that “the impact of this tax change will be catastrophic for the entire industry, which represents nearly 70,000 jobs,” and that the government was giving “insufficient” reasons to justify this VAT increase. Jacques Myard, deputy mayor (UMP) of Maisons-Laffitte, told the National Assembly of the “catastrophic situation” into which the VAT increase could plunge the horse industry, and of the difficulties already encountered in the equestrian sports sector, where many owners are ceasing their activity. He called for an urgent moratorium. Valérie Fourneyron replied that the conflict dates back to 2007 and that since France was condemned for its failure to comply, no lasting solution has been found by the industry to maintain the reduced rate for equestrian centers. On November 29, Agriculture Minister Stéphane Le Foll declared himself in favor of a 7% VAT rate for equestrian centers.

On December 4, 2013, the Senate amendment was presented to the National Assembly. Jacques Myard points out that “never has such a brutal increase in VAT been applied in this country.” Charles de Courson defends the possibility of reduced VAT for owners of horses in training. However, the amendment was not adopted.

=== Differentiation by activity ===
On November 29, Stéphane Le Foll announced on BFM TV / RMC that work was underway to apply different VAT rates to different sectors of the equestrian industry. Teaching (riding lessons) could be subject to a different rate than boarding and half-boarding services for horses. The government is basing its position on European regulations, which stipulate that access to sports facilities is eligible for the reduced VAT rate.

On December 2, ministers Stéphane Le Foll (agriculture), Valérie Fourneyron (sport), and Bernard Cazeneuve (budget) announced during a press briefing that “the Government intends to actively defend the possibility of applying a reduced VAT rate to equestrian sports activities,” i.e. 10%, from January 1, 2014, for “certain activities offered in riding schools,” linked to the “right to use sports facilities.” To this end, they announce their intention to write to the European Commissioner for Taxation, Algirdas Šemeta. Harlem Désir in return confirms this objective on BFM TV.

=== Meeting in Brussels ===
Following the announcement of the government's intention to defend the equestrian sector in Brussels, several anti-equitax demonstrations were canceled, notably in front of the Ministry of the Economy and Finance on December 9 and on Sunday, December 15 in Lille, where 2,000 people were expected.

On December 13, a delegation of ministers, trade unionists, and equestrian professionals (GHN, FFE, and Coordination rurale) travels to Brussels to negotiate the VAT rate applicable to equestrian center activities with Kestutis Sadauskas, Algirdas Šemeta's chief of staff. The European Commission replies that the VAT rate will not be renegotiated and applies in the same way to all European countries, mentioning the possibility of releasing aid for rural development. France Télévisions considers that the demonstrators against the equitax are “rather losers,” and that their demands have not been heard. The government states that it remains “determined” to obtain a reduced VAT rate for equestrian centers.

=== Application and changes ===
On January 1, 2014, the VAT applicable to the equestrian sector was switched to the standard rate, as provided for in the decree of November 13. Various journalists write as protests and appeals to the government go unheeded. On January 31, Bernard Cazeneuve signed a modification to VAT rates in the equestrian sector, reintroducing a reduced rate for the use of sports facilities, as proposed in the amendment previously voted by the Senate. It confirms the application of the reduced rate to all contracts concluded in 2013. Boarding horses, dressage, and equine sales, in particular, are at full rate. Édouard de Mareschal, for Le Figaro, believes that the government has done its utmost to spare equestrian centers. According to France Bleu, “Riders and equestrian centers ended up having the skin of the equitaxes.”

On February 4, 2014, Marie-Thérèse Sanchez-Schmid and Sophie Auconie met with European Commissioner Androulla Vassiliou to have horse riding officially recognized as a sporting activity, which would enable it to be included in the 2014 VAT directive. The aim of French equestrian institutions is now to obtain lower taxation from the European Union for equestrian activities in the 28 member countries.

== Demonstrations and escargot operations ==
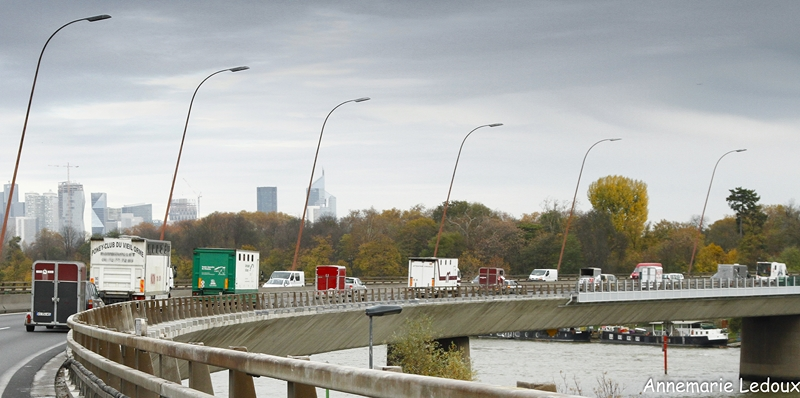
Horse transport trucks during anti-horse tax protests in Paris

The equestrian world as a whole is protesting against this VAT increase at the end of 2013, an event “perhaps unprecedented in French history.”

=== Protest organization ===
Shortly after the announcement of the abolition of the reduced VAT rate, spontaneous demonstrations and escargot operations were organized all over France by young riders and equestrian center managers, with horses and ponies, with no prior call for demonstrations from official bodies (such as the French Equestrian Federation). The main demand was to “let the industry live.” The equestrian world is usually discreet, and most of these people are demonstrating for the first time on this occasion. All generations were present, with a majority of young women. Many equestrian center managers in associations under the law of 1901, unaffected by VAT which they do not pay, are supporting the equestrian sector by organizing petitions, for example. These operations reflect a desire to “remain respectful and well-behaved” (according to Cheval Magazine), but some equestrian center managers (notably in the Lys plain) say they are ready for civil disobedience. The slogans evoke the presidency of François Hollande — “Hollande, t'es foutu, les poneys sont dans la rue” ("Hollande, you're screwed, the ponies are in the street") —, but also the Findus affair — "TVA en plus, on finit chez Findus" (“VAT plus, we end up at Findus”).

=== November 2013 ===
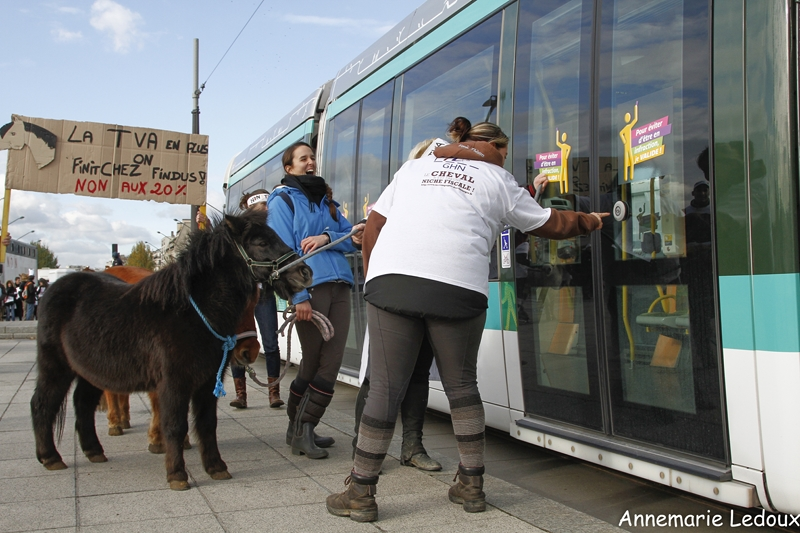
Anti-equitax demonstration on November 19 in Paris

The first demonstrations take place over the All Saints' weekend in Lyon during the Equita'Lyon 2013 trade show. This was followed by movements in Fontainebleau and Rouen on November 6, which brought together 500 people and 130 ponies. In Nancy, on the 7th, 60 horses gathered in Place Stanislas. The same day, in Metz, the demonstration came close to a serious incident, with tear gas being thrown at three riders and a pony. On November 8, 120 people, including 60 riders, marched in Melun and around thirty in Meaux. The demonstration in Dijon on the 9th resulted in another incident: one or two ponies took the tramway with their young riders.

The first Paris demonstration was organized on November 11, with 4,000 people and 200 ponies marching. The towns of Toulouse (600 riders), Tarbes, and Montpellier also hosted demonstrations on the 12th, and 2,000 riders and over 500 horses gathered in Montpellier, creating a 15-kilometer traffic jam on the A9 autoroute. On November 14, another escargot operation blocked the A6 and A10 to the ring road at Cours de Vincennes, where demonstrators organized free pony rides. On November 16, 300 people, including several riders, marched through the streets of Mâcon, and 400 in Strasbourg. On the same day, thousands of demonstrators mobilized in the west of France (Quimper, Brest, Rennes, and Nantes), including 2,000 people in Nantes with 300 ponies and 2,500 in Rennes, where a flash mob was organized for the occasion. The following day, 1,000 to 1,500 people marched through Caen. On November 18, the riders blocked Route Nationale 137 between Rochefort and La Rochelle.

Laurent Cremaschi, manager of an equestrian center in the Vosges, created a crusade against taxes by riding to Paris on November 4, to question the government. He was welcomed at the Haras de Jardy on November 19, along with a group of protesting riders. On the same day, the demonstration in Périgueux attracted 200 riders.

A national demonstration called by official organizations (FFE, FNC, GHN, and FNSEA) was held in Paris on November 24. It attracted 5,000 people according to the police, 15,000 according to the organizers, and 20,000 (and 1,000 ponies) according to the French Equestrian Federation. Former UMP minister Chantal Jouanno, also a keen equestrian, joined the movement. The mobilization continued during the Paris Horse Show and in Bordeaux on November 29, with 300 riders participating. On the same day, riders attempted to blockade the Chiesi factory in La Chaussée-Saint-Victor, where Arnaud Montebourg was visiting. On the 30th, Angoulême hosted a demonstration that was attended by almost 500 people.

=== December 2013 ===
==== Demonstrations on Reunion Island ====
On Reunion Island, where VAT would rise from 2.2% to 8.5%, mobilization was organized in early December, led by La Horde réunionnaise, which was calling for demonstrations in Saint-Denis. The horse professionals on the island feared a loss of riders and the death of their industry, exacerbated by the reform of school rhythms, which has reduced their clientele, and the rising price of horse feed. Representatives of the 37 clubs on the island, which account for 300 jobs, demonstrated on the 19th and organized a double escargot operation from L'Éperon and Saint-Benoit.

==== December 1st and 2nd ====
On December 1, 600 people and 170 horses marched through the streets of Nice. To mark the occasion, the mayor of the city, Christian Estrosi, joined the demonstrators on horseback. The following day, the escargot operation occurred in the Paris region to mark the opening of the Paris Horse Show and disrupted the Boulevard Périphérique without, however, blocking it with 40 km of slowdowns in three sectors towards Paris. The mobilization was stronger than the truckers against the ecotax on the same day, with 120 trucks. According to the spokesman for the "L'équitation en péril" collective, the mobilization is growing stronger. Another escargot operation took place on the same day in the Drôme, Ardèche, and Haute-Savoie regions, near Annemasse. Ministers Bernard Cazeneuve, Stéphane Le Foll, and Valérie Fourneyron organized an emergency press briefing on the evening of December 2, to reiterate “their commitment to the equestrian industry.”

==== From December 3 to 19 ====
On the 3rd, the demonstration in Strasbourg attracted just fifteen vehicles and a delegation of thirteen professionals. On the 5th, demonstrators dumped manure in front of the sub-prefecture in Gex, Ain. On the 8th, several thousand demonstrators gather in Orléans: 2,000 according to the police, and 5,000 according to the organizers, with 1,500 ponies. On the 9th, demonstrators in Pau, led by La Horde, attempted to meet with Mayor Martine Lignières-Cassou and the Prefect. On the 11th, it was Grenoble's turn to host a demonstration: 500 people and 57 horses according to the police, and between 700 and 1000 according to journalists from the Dauphiné Libéré. A demonstration took place in the streets of Annecy on Wednesday, December 11. On the same day, an operation escargot on the Chambéry expressway caused 7 km of traffic jams between 8 and 10 a.m. In Saint-Étienne on the same day, 200 demonstrators marched. On the 12th, a further 200 people gathered in Divonne-les-Bains with around thirty equines. On the 15th, 600 riders demonstrated in Limoges.

On December 19, Pascal Mulet-Querner, spokesman for the “Équitation en péril” collective, and Serge Lecomte, President of the French Equestrian Federation, rode in a horse-drawn carriage to the Élysée Palace to hand over a petition, a letter, and some of the 50,000 letters written by visitors to the Paris Horse Show in response to the VAT hike. With Sports Minister Valérie Fourneyron's visit to Moselle, an operation escargot takes place on the freeway near Metz.

==== After December 20 ====
As part of the “crottin pour tous” operation (a reaction to François Hollande's statement, quoted in Le Canard enchaîné on December 3, likening demonstrators against the “equitax” to the “indestructible right”), 20 tons of horse manure were deposited in front of the Public Treasury in Bellegarde-sur-Valserine, Ain, on December 20. On the same day, horse-riding professionals tied their horses to the gates of the Chambéry prefecture, letting it be known that they would leave them there “for lack of means to maintain them.” On December 21, around Dijon, demonstrators carry out escargot operations at shopping malls.

On December 23, a European demonstration was organized in several cities, with 500 trucks setting off from Brussels, Luxembourg, Stuttgart, Turin, Barcelona, and The Hague. There were 60 riders in Ajaccio, but only a hundred or so at Mont-Saint-Michel, probably due to bad weather. In Paris and Nantes, balloon releases were organized during these events. In Strasbourg, some fifty vehicles brought the demonstrators.

On Christmas Day, December 25, 5 ponies were tied to the gates of the Chambéry prefecture. As part of the “manure for all” operation, a hundred liters of horse manure were deposited in front of the Domfront tax center on the night of December 26, following similar operations across the country.

=== January 2014 ===
Protests against the equitax became rare in January 2014. Leaders of equestrian centers in the Rhône-Alpes region are received by elected officials at the Lyon regional council's 2014 greetings on January 10. On January 13, demonstrators set up a roadblock in Rochefort, distributing leaflets. On Thursday, January 16, an equestrian center manager already known for his anti-equitax actions dumped 15 tons of manure in front of the French National Assembly. A few anti-equitaxers joined the “Day of Anger” demonstration in Paris on January 26.

== Reactions ==
The “equitax” has provoked reactions from French equestrian institutions, politicians (mostly in opposition), MEPs, riders, and other personalities. La France Agricole polled on November 15, showed that 60% of Internet users consulting their site did not understand the VAT increase, compared with 36% who did.

=== Equestrian institutions and professionals ===
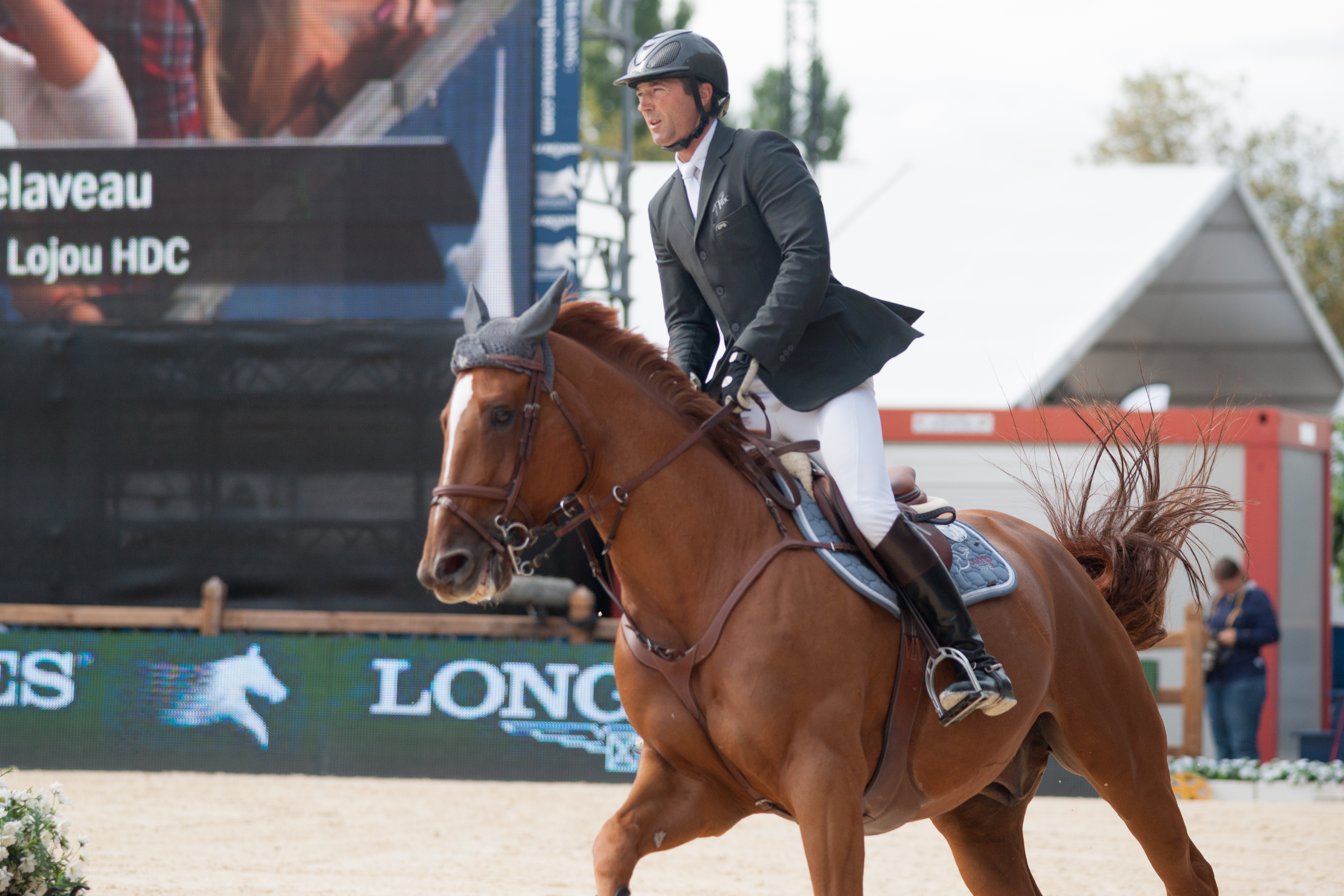
Rider Patrice Delaveau has publicly expressed his opposition to equitaxation.

The creation of the “horse fund” has been “coolly received” by professionals, who refer to it as a “gas factory.” Some professional riders have publicly stated their opposition to the equitax. Patrice Delaveau wore an armband of support at Equita'Lyon 2013, and Hervé Godignon, who co-founded the movement “indignés de la politique fédérale” (outraged by federal policy), marched in Paris on November 11. Interviewed by RTL on November 22, rider Pierre Durand considers the protest movement to be legitimate and “dignified.” Véronique Oury, director of the Paris Horse Show, publicly announced her support for the movement.

Serge Lecomte, President of the FFE, considers that his sector is a “collateral victim” of a European measure that essentially targeted horse betting. He initially denounced the creation of the “horse fund” as a “gimmick.” However, in an interview given on Equidia the day before the meeting in Brussels, he thanked “the unfailing support of the political classes and the government.” Henry Moreigne, for Le Monde, believes, however, that the origins of the crisis in the French equestrian world lie in “the responsibility and incompetence of the FFE's leaders, more concerned with their interests than those of their licensees,” and in the existence of conflicts of interest due to “the absence of democracy within the FFE,” resulting in a lack of credibility for the entire industry.

“La Horde Française,” a movement opposed to equitax created by Bérengère d'Espeuilles, has organized itself into regional delegations. Ludovic Roy, owner of the Haras de Boisemont, heads the Normandy Horde, which organized the Rouen event. It is also behind numerous demonstrations in the provinces and on the island of La Réunion.

Pascal Mulet-Querner is the spokesman for the “Equitation en péril” collective. It brings together the Fédération française d'équitation (FFE), the Groupement hippique national (GHN), the Fédération nationale du cheval (FNC), and the Chambre syndicale du commerce des chevaux de France (CSCCF). Its representatives believe that the increase in VAT on all equestrian activities was decided by François Hollande's government without any European pressure. Pascal Mulet-Querner sees equestrian centers as “the last places of life in the countryside,” and says that the President of the Republic can go as far as the procedure of failure upon failure with Europe, then use the 20 million euros of the horse fund to pay the fine.

In a press release, the Groupement hippique national said that “the finance administration is lying to the government, which then does the same to Parliament, the equestrian industry, and millions of French people,” denouncing “the government's doublespeak and the possibility of maintaining a reduced rate in riding schools, even in the opinion of the European Commission.” Coordination rurale, for its part, denounced a “sham of consultation” between the government and representatives of the equestrian industry: the implementing decree abolishing the reduced rate was dated the same day as the consultation, November 12, which means that “the Minister for the Budget already had it in his pocket when he pretended to listen to representatives of the industry.”

=== French politicians ===
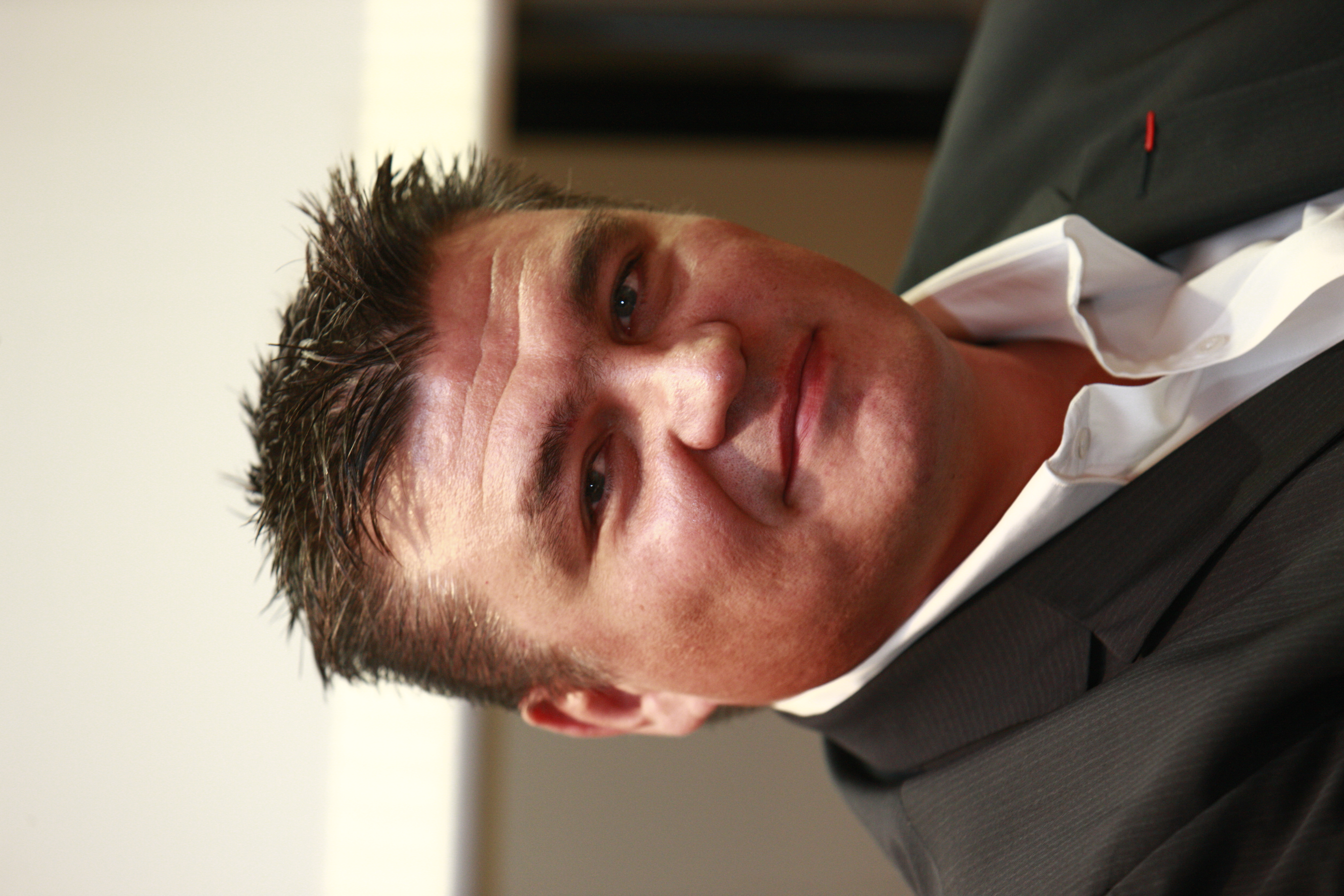
David Douillet (UMP) opposed the equitax since November 14, 2013

Opposition politicians were quick to speak out. David Douillet, former Sports Minister under François Fillon's government and UMP deputy, wrote to François Hollande on November 14 to point out that the 6,000 jobs and 80,000 horses condemned represent “the biggest social plan in France, which is being implemented before our very eyes.” Marine Le Pen considers this VAT increase to be an “unacceptable decision” for equestrian centers and that “we have to know how to say no to the injunctions of the European Union.” Nicolas Dupont-Aignan is also opposed to the European aspect of this “equitax.” Interviewed on France 5 on November 27, François Bayrou spoke of a death sentence for the industry and said he supported the equestrian centers' approach, adding that “it's shameful that horse-riding should be a sport for the rich, because the horse is formidably educational, including for young disabled people.”

Front de gauche president Pascal Savoldelli points to “the absence of an official request from the European Commission” and “the absence of a procedure for failure to fulfill an obligation,” arguing that the VAT increase is a “preventive measure taken in anticipation,” which cannot be justified. The French Communist Party announces its support for the equestrian clubs' action on December 2. On December 4, Jean-Luc Mélenchon mentioned the existence of a reduced rate for the use of sports facilities on a European scale.

Some elected representatives have voiced their concerns about this VAT in regions where the equestrian sector has a strong presence. Calvados General Council President Jean-Léonce Dupont (UDI-UC) has written to Prime Minister Jean-Marc Ayrault to call for the reduced VAT rate to be maintained as a matter of urgency, adding that “4,400 direct jobs” depend on it in his department, which will host the 2014 World Equestrian Games. Pau mayor Martine Lignières-Cassou (PS) also called on the government to reverse this decision, arguing that the Pau equestrian industry employs 800 people. Côte d'Or Senator Alain Houpert (UMP) made the same request to Bernard Cazeneuve. On December 3, Frédéric Meura, a UMP politician from Thiérache, spoke of a major blow to the 1,500 companies, 5,000 employees, and 26,000 horse-riding licensees in the Picardie region, which together generate annual sales of over 145 million euros, “making Picardie the leading equestrian region in France.” The Association des maires de France (French Mayors' Association) also brought the concerns of the equestrian community to the attention of Prime Minister Jean-Marc Ayrault. Following a meeting with equestrian industry professionals in Brittany on December 7, PS politician Pierrick Massiot sent a letter to Stéphane Le Foll expressing the risks facing this “very present” industry.

According to the "L'équitation en péril" collective, by December 3, Communist MPs, Greens, and some Socialists had sided with the anti-equitax protesters. On the same day, Le Canard enchaîné picked up on remarks made by French President François Hollande. On the sidelines of a PS rally, he was quoted as saying of the anti-equitax protesters: “It's the same clientele that demonstrated against same-sex marriage in France. It's the stubborn right. It's all manipulation.” This statement caused quite a stir and led to the “manure for all” operation in retaliation.

=== Members of the European Parliament ===
With the responsibility of the European Union under discussion, several MEPs believe that the decision to raise the VAT rate was taken in advance by the French government. Philippe Boulland denounces “the use, as always easy, of Europe as a scapegoat,” while MP Agnès Le Brun sees it as overzealousness on the part of the French government. Gilbert Collard, for his part, denounces the government's interpretation of the EU injunction, and this measure applied to a sector “which generates 900 million euros in sales” and “creates jobs” while being “very poorly subsidized.” According to Franck Proust, “This decision — to increase VAT — is a preventive measure, not based on any obligation.”

Rachida Dati is astonished by this desire to impose higher taxes on a sector that cannot be relocated and does not create competition on the European market and regrets that this appears to be pointless interference from Brussels, fueling a feeling of Euroscepticism.

=== Public figures ===
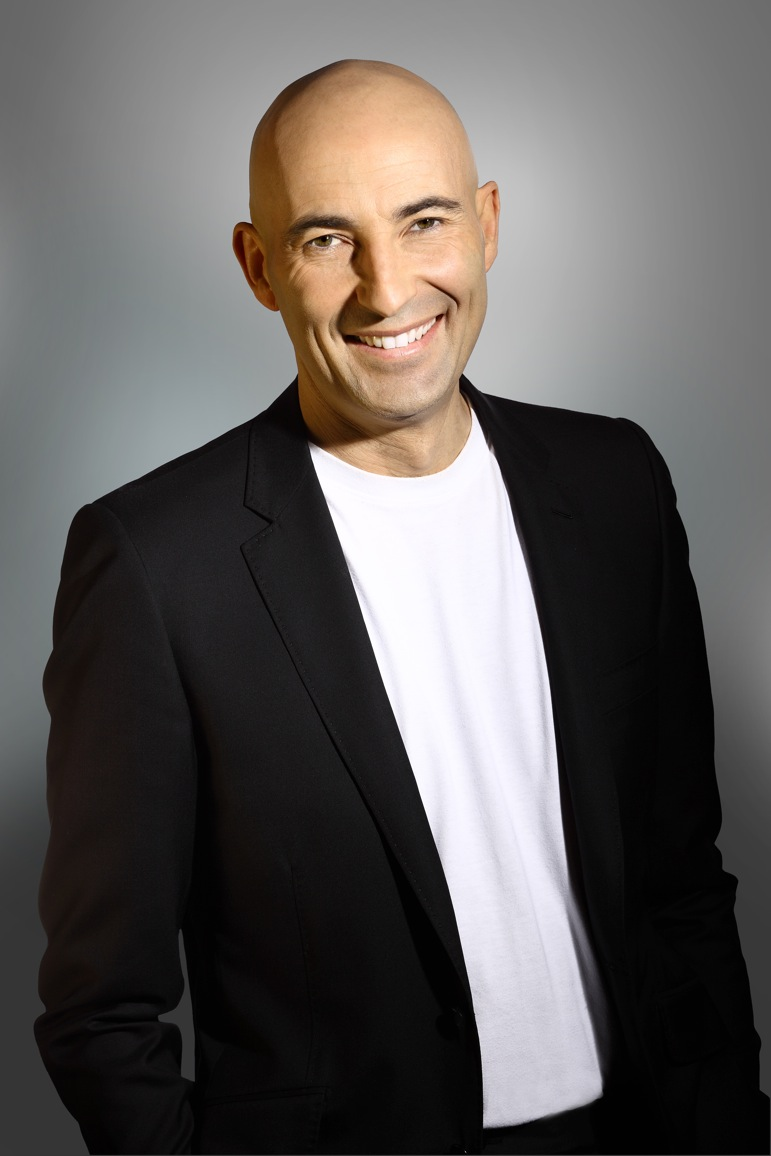
Nicolas Canteloup has carried out several anti-horse tax actions, notably at the Paris Horse Show.

Comedian Nicolas Canteloup, a former riding school instructor, made several references to the anti-equitax demonstrations in his “revue de presque” on Europe 1 on November 14. He was back in the news at the Gucci Masters at the Horse Show on December 8, arriving at the famous show jumping competition in disguise and wearing a red bonnet to talk about the difficulties facing the equestrian sector in France. Jean Rochefort, actor, and horse breeder, calls for the human aspect of the problem to be examined, given the threat to the lives of 80,000 horses, as well as the economic aspect.

In a press release published on November 14, Brigitte Bardot denounced “the French government, the servant of scandalously unfair and inhumane European directives, which overtax the activity of riding schools while allowing horse dealers to benefit from reduced VAT to send horses to slaughter.”

=== Criticism of corporatism and lobbying ===
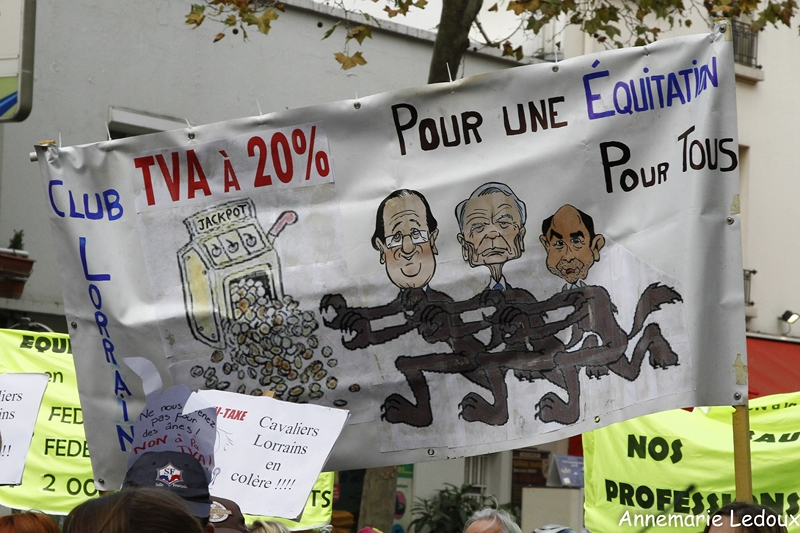
Anti-tax banner during the November 19, 2013 demonstration in Paris

Several critics denounce the corporatist aspect of the demonstrations and the lobbying carried out by horse professionals. In an article in Les Échos, Leïla de Comarmond warns of the danger of this movement, with everyone protesting against their tax during a difficult financial period. She adds that the professionals protesting are forgetting the public financial windfall from which their activities benefit. In his Figaro blog, sports specialist Frank Pons denounces the effective lobbying carried out by horse professionals to sweep away regulatory constraints likely “to slow down or limit their development.” Not content with having obtained tax instruction from the French parliament, the equestrian industry's lobbyists are trying to get horse riding included in the forthcoming European VAT directive. The Union Patronale Fitness Bien être et Santé (UFBS) has denounced the privileged position of sports associations and equestrian centers, which it associates with tax exemption, compared with active non-competitive leisure businesses (such as dog-sledding, canoeing, sailing, hiking, and karting), which are subject to normal VAT.

The Vegan movement, opposed to animal exploitation, denounces not only the risk of horse slaughter but also the commercial nature of equestrian centers, for whom “only profit is sought because if a horse is not profitable, we simply kill it.” He pinpoints the statement made by a breeder, Xavier Lerond, who, to lighten his industry's tax burden “threatens to slaughter 80,000 horses.”

== Consequences for the equine industry ==
The consequences of applying the equitax were initially anticipated, assuming that a generalized VAT rate of 20% would have been applied.

=== Anticipated consequences ===
According to the Fédération Nationale du cheval (FNC), the Groupement hippique national (GHN), and the Fédération française d'équitation (FFE), a generalized VAT rate of 20% would have jeopardized 2,000 equestrian centers and 6,000 salaried jobs and threatened 80,000 to 100,000 horses with slaughter. Serge Lecomte, president of the FFE, points out that the increase in horse boarding costs penalizes the most modest riders (those who ride in riding schools and have their horses boarded or half-boarded) while sparing the wealthiest, who can afford to keep their horses at home. The HLG adds that this will put an end to the democratization of horse riding, making the sport once again inaccessible to part of the population. The cost to the companies concerned is estimated at around 100 million euros. The horse fund, which would be topped up by 20 million euros, would not be sufficient to compensate for this.

In addition to the difficulties posed by the VAT hike, equestrian center professionals point out that the reform of school rhythms penalizes them, as 30 to 40% of their activity takes place on Wednesday mornings. This represents around 20% fewer registrations.

=== Real consequences ===
For much of January, professionals in the equestrian sector were “balancing between vagueness and a wait-and-see attitude.” After the provisional increase in the VAT rate, the Villeveyrac riding school in the Hérault region of France closed down because, according to its manager, it was necessary to raise the price of an hour's riding from €13 to €20. However, this increase is much higher than the rise in the VAT rate. In Limousin, some professionals are choosing not to increase their rates despite their low margins.

Thanks to the tax instruction published on January 31, the overall VAT borne by the equestrian sector is estimated at around 10%, instead of the 20% initially planned: equestrian center services have been divided between access to sports facilities, horse boarding or half-boarding and teaching. According to France Bleu journalists, “We can no longer speak of an equitax,” and the price of certain services could even fall. However, this decision complicates the accounting of the establishments concerned.

According to some industry professionals, five months on, prices for lessons and courses have risen slightly. One year after the protests, the equestrian sector is showing a drop in the number of licensees. According to Serge Lecomte, interviewed in November 2014, the equestrian sector is “on life support,” but he rules out organizing further events. The industry's economic statistics are proving quite poor, with a drop in breeding, a decline in licensees, and the number of customers for French riding schools. The direct consequences are an increase in the number of abandoned horses, and more animals being sent to slaughter. As of January 1, 2015, the situation has become even more precarious, as the reduced rates can no longer be applied at all to boarding and teaching services. The French equestrian and horse-breeding sector is now much less advantageous, in terms of taxation than in Ireland, where legislation makes it possible to circumvent European tax rules on racehorse breeding, leading this country to be described as a “tax haven for horses.”

In September 2019, professional horse breeders are calling for VAT to be stopped, due to competition with amateur breeders, who sell their horses 20% cheaper.

== See also ==
- Equestrianism in France
