= Equestrianism in Brittany =

Equine racing in France

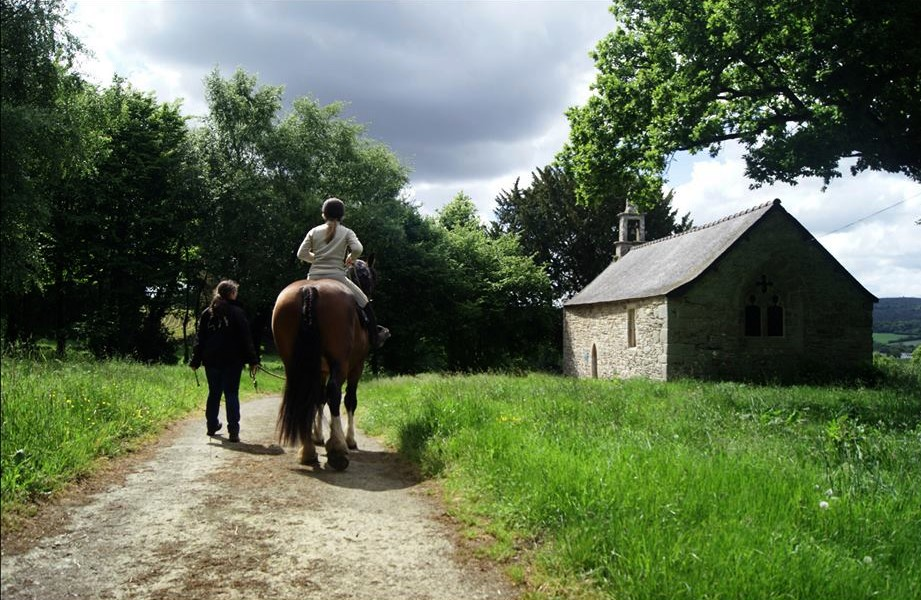
- Horseback riding on a Breton mare near Bourbriac
- Registered players: 38450 (2011)
- Clubs: 408 (2011)

Equestrianism has been practiced in Brittany since at least Celtic times, and continues to be used for military purposes and travel. Although horse racing is a very old tradition in Lower Brittany, equestrian sport, codified in England, took root in the 19th century, to the detriment of more popular traditions. The practice of equestrianism declined as transport improved in the 19th and 20th centuries, before undergoing profound changes with the growth of the sports and leisure markets.

Equestrian tourism now has a strong presence in Brittany, particularly along the regional Equibreizh trail. Since the end of the 20th century, equestrian sports have earned Breton riders a number of European and world awards, particularly in endurance, thanks to international riders such as Stéphane Fleury and Élodie Le Labourier. Nevertheless, most of the equestrian competitions organized in Brittany involve show jumping, particularly at the Val Porée equestrian stadium and in Lorient.

== History ==
=== From Antiquity to the end of the 18th century ===
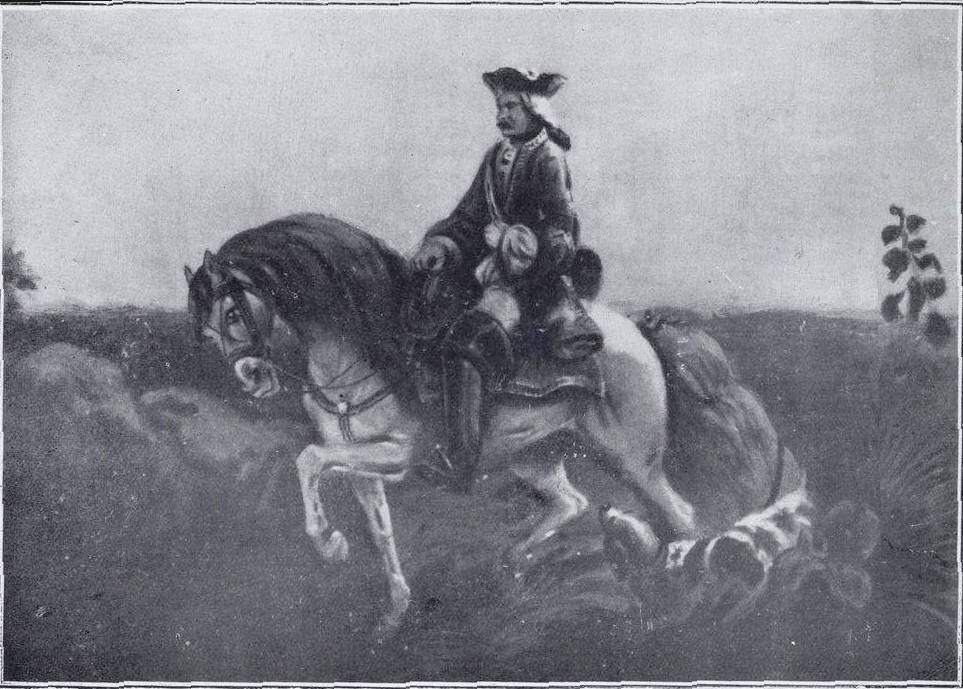
Seigneur breton partant à la chasse (reproduction of a painting, date unknown).

Equestrianism seems to have been unknown in the Neolithic period. It was certainly introduced by migrants in the 3rd millennium BC, a period that marked the beginnings of the Bronze Age. Bronze bits and other pieces of harness have been found in Breton Late Bronze deposits, attesting to the practice of horseback riding around 750 / 10002 BC. The Celtic peoples of Armorica were essentially military horsemen. This "age of horsemen" led to a cult of the warrior. Armorican horsemen wore bronze helmets and sometimes breastplates.

Mounted or harnessed to war chariots, and sometimes to trade wagons inland, according to Diodorus of Sicily, horses were never harnessed to ploughs, which remained the prerogative of oxen. Horse racing in Brittany also dates back to Celtic times. In 549, Saint Teilo is said to have prayed to God that Breton warriors would be the strongest and most valiant of all nations in mounted combat. In 851, Brittany's cavalry, led by Erispoë, defeated Charles the Bald's armies near Redon. The feudal aristocracy grew out of this animal's military role. In the Middle Ages, horses continued to be ridden, and carriages were pulled by oxen. Duchess Anne, for example, used bovine traction. In the 17th century, Le Boucher du Crosco, a member of Brittany's Royal Academy of Agriculture, proposed the establishment of horse racing in Brittany on the model of England. In the 18th century, Breton farmers still used oxen for ploughing, as Jacques Charpy reports.

=== 19th century ===
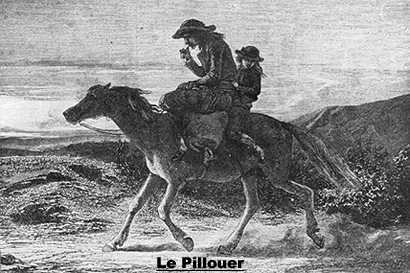
Engraving of a pilhaouer.

In the 19th century, the use of horses became more widespread.

==== Peasant usage ====
In the 19th century, the horse was ridden or harnessed for a wide range of tasks: moving materials such as stone and wood, ploughing, pulling the harrow, transporting people, taking farm produce to market, collecting seaweed, etc. The Bretons of the mountains used the horse for a wide range of tasks. Mountain Bretons practiced horseback riding for much of the century: one of Brittany's particularities compared to other French provinces is the absence of donkey use. According to Ephrem Houël, even the poorest peasants had to own at least one horse. A high degree of versatility was required, in line with agricultural structures: until the 1900s, the same animal had to be able to pull the harrow at a walk in the fields and trot to market on the roads. According to Houël, it was especially at weddings that horseback riding was de rigueur: "woe betide the guest who does not have a horse to ride on this solemn occasion, honor to the one who possesses a brilliant and especially a fast bidet, for the party will not be complete unless several races are run in honor of the young couple". Houël also testifies to the harness: a light pack-saddle, trimmed with a skin or cushion, tightened in the middle by a strap. The bridle is hard, and the stirrups are generally two double ropes into which the foot is inserted up to the heel. Riders stand straight and perfectly upright. Their knees are raised to pommel height. Alexandre Bouët and Olivier Perrin explain in Breiz Ivel, ou Vie des Bretons dans l'Armorique (1835) that brides, grooms, relatives and friends mount their horses just after the wedding ceremony, with a pack, a crude bridle and no stirrups, before setting off at full gallop.

Houël also testifies to the horsemanship of these peasants: "nothing is more curious than to see them, on their way back from fairs and markets, snaking up and down the hillsides". The women rode astride just like the men, if we are to believe the photographs on postcards from the late 19th and early 20th centuries.

==== Development of horse racing ====
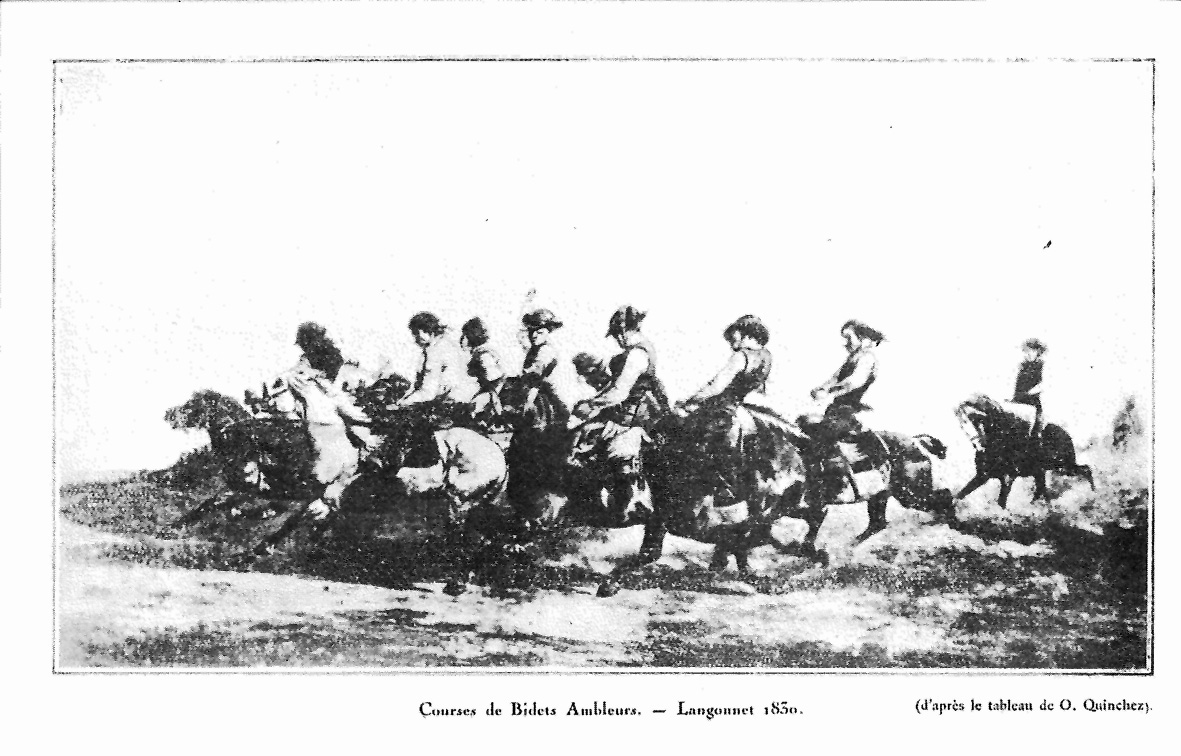
Amble bidet race in Langonnet, 1830.

Horse racing is traditional in Basse-Bretagne, making it a pioneer region in this sport. These races represent a tradition and an honor in the villages. The winner attaches a laurel branch to the head of his mount, a "relatively ugly and small" mountain bidet. The animal is ridden by a teenager aged twelve or fifteen. They race ten or twelve at a time, sometimes more, over rough terrain without falling off.

Equestrian sport developed throughout the 19th century. It was not until 1805 that codified "hippism" (horse racing), imported from England at the instigation of Napoleon I, took root. The idea was to encourage the "improvement" of local breeds. The following year, the Saint-Brieuc and Morbihan imperial races were founded. The races, known as "au clocher", were long-distance races over one mile of difficult terrain. They were open to riders of both sexes, and it was not unusual for women to win. The first Saint-Brieuc race was run on 14 June 1807. These first events saw local farmers compete on their bareback, bridle-mounted, bitless bidets. In 1813, the Minister of the Interior downgraded the Saint-Brieuc races to "second-rate races", arguing that riders and horses from the Côtes-du-Nord region could not compete with those from Paris. Nevertheless, they were maintained, and the number of participants grew with the establishment of a large number of races in the five Breton départements and throughout the West.

In the 1820s, the first Thoroughbreds arrived in the region, ridden by professional jockeys. As they won more and more victories, racing lost its popular aspect. From 1840 to 1850, the number of racing societies multiplied, notably at Langonnet, where "train racing" was practiced. Trotting races developed later, first in Nantes in 1835. The French government advocated their introduction to enable local people to compete again.

=== 20th and 21st centuries ===
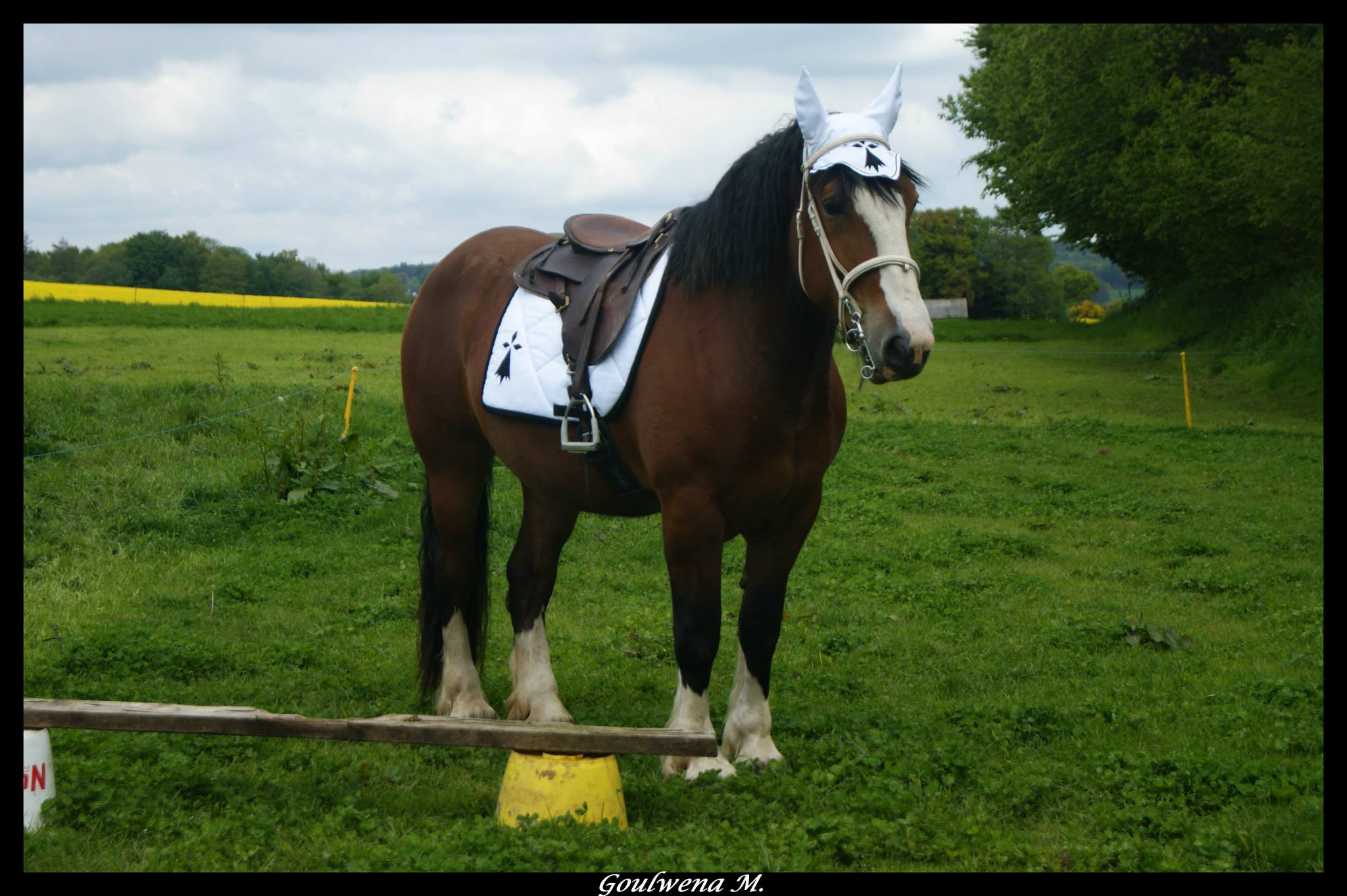
Breton mare.

Like all regions of Western Europe, Brittany underwent a profound change in the practice of horse riding, with the end of the military and utilitarian use of the horse. Only equestrian sports developed over the course of the century. Around 1984, Breton market gardeners still employed around 400 horses. By 2004, almost all of them had disappeared. At the same time, the market for sports and leisure horses was expanding rapidly. In the 1970s, some breeders began to adapt to this market, switching from breeding draught horses to horses for leisure riding. In the 1990s, Brittany's two national stud farms began to promote carriage driving, and some towns began to promote their equestrian leisure activities. The Haras National d'Hennebont is transformed into a cultural center designed as an open-air museum. The Haras National de Lamballe is becoming even more involved, pursuing a policy of supporting leisure horse breeding, much to the chagrin of Breton beef horse breeders. A new generation of breeders from non-agricultural backgrounds is acquiring Breton horses to be used for leisure riding and driving.

At the end of 2013, Brittany joined the French protests against "equitaxis". On 16 November, anti-equitax demonstrations took place in Quimper, Brest, Rennes and Nantes. Around 2,000 people demonstrated in Nantes with 300 ponies, and 2,500 in Rennes, where a flashmob was organized for the occasion. As elsewhere in France, the Breton equestrian sector has been going through a crisis since 2014, due to the increase in VAT and the reform of school rhythms.

== Practices ==
According to Brittany's regional riding committee, the administrative region (excluding Loire-Atlantique) had 38,450 members of the French Equestrian Federation in 2011, with an increase of 48% since 2005. These figures are stable, as the number of licensees counted at the start of 2015 stands at around 39,000. Most of Brittany's professional riding stables are recent, dating back no further than 2000.

=== Leisure and tourism ===
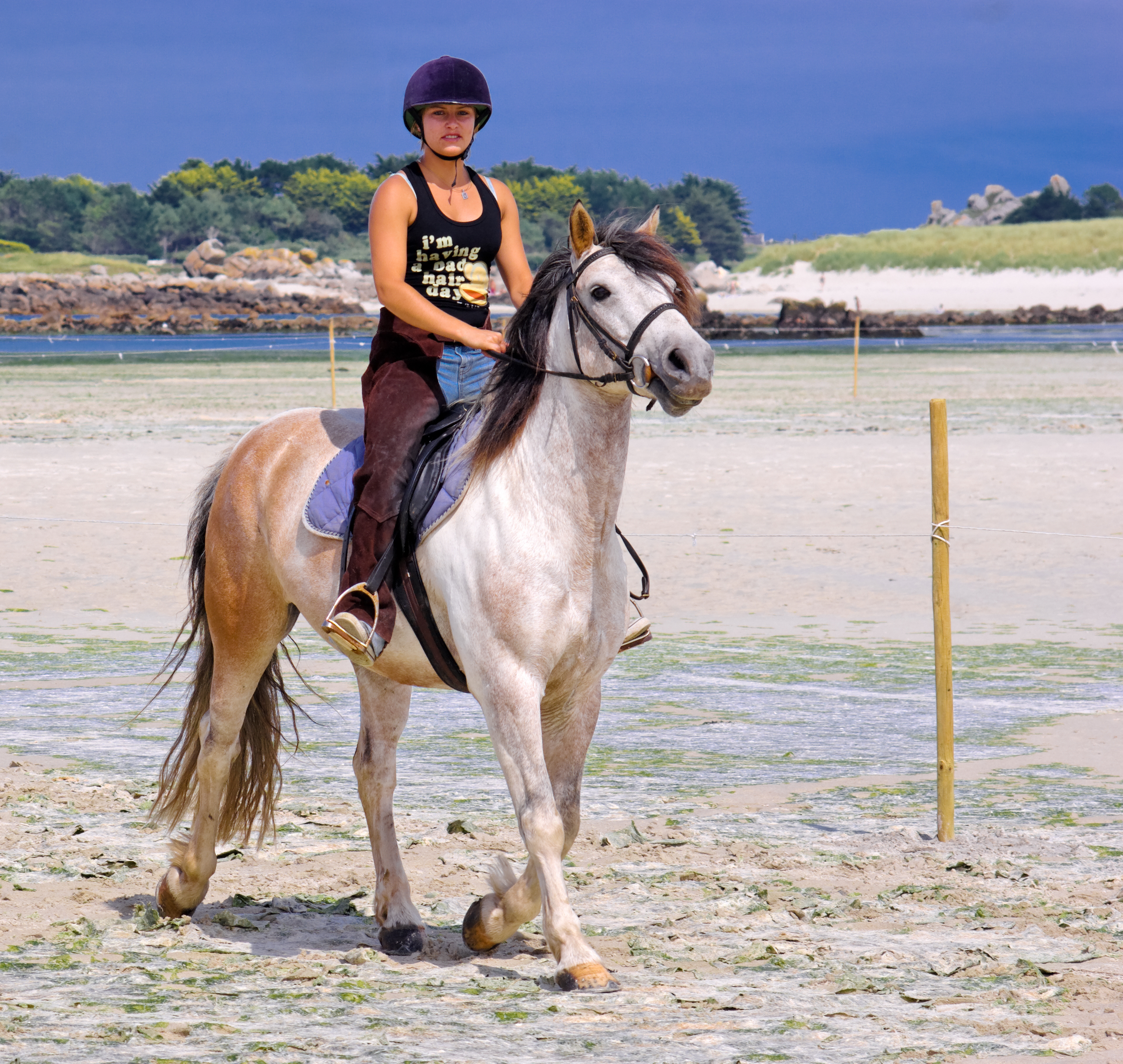
Equestrian tourism on a Finistère beach.

Brittany has developed its equestrian tourism sector considerably. In 2011, 229 gîtes d'étape and 87 establishments were dedicated to this sector. This enables summer riders to discover a wide variety of landscapes. Most of Brittany's equestrian centers offer touring packages to the region's most famous sites. The Equibreizh, a regional trail unique in France, allows riders to tour Brittany on horseback, along 2,600 km of public and private paths, passing through small towns of character, historic sites and monuments. It comprises two diagonal routes, one linking Paimpont to the Montagnes Noires, the other Saint-Brieuc to Josselin. The paths are listed in the Plan départemental des itinéraires de promenade et de randonnée, and marked by orange squares with a horseshoe in the center. Staging points with adjoining stalls or meadows are provided every 30 kilometers.

The Costarmoricaine, the Trans-Ille-et-Vilaine, the Finistours and the Transmorbihannaise are departmental equestrian trails. La Costarmoricaine lasts six days and crosses the Côtes d'Armor département. Since 1991, it has also been possible to cross the Bay of Saint-Brieuc on horseback. The Trans-Ille-et-Vilaine is organized every year by AACIV, the Association à cheval en Ille-et-Vilaine. Held over 6 to 10 days in May, it features a different itinerary and theme each time. The Transmorbihannaise is traditionally organized over the Ascension weekend. The Finistours is organized under the aegis of the Finistère departmental equestrian tourism committee, on the department's 500 km of equestrian trails.

=== Horse racing ===
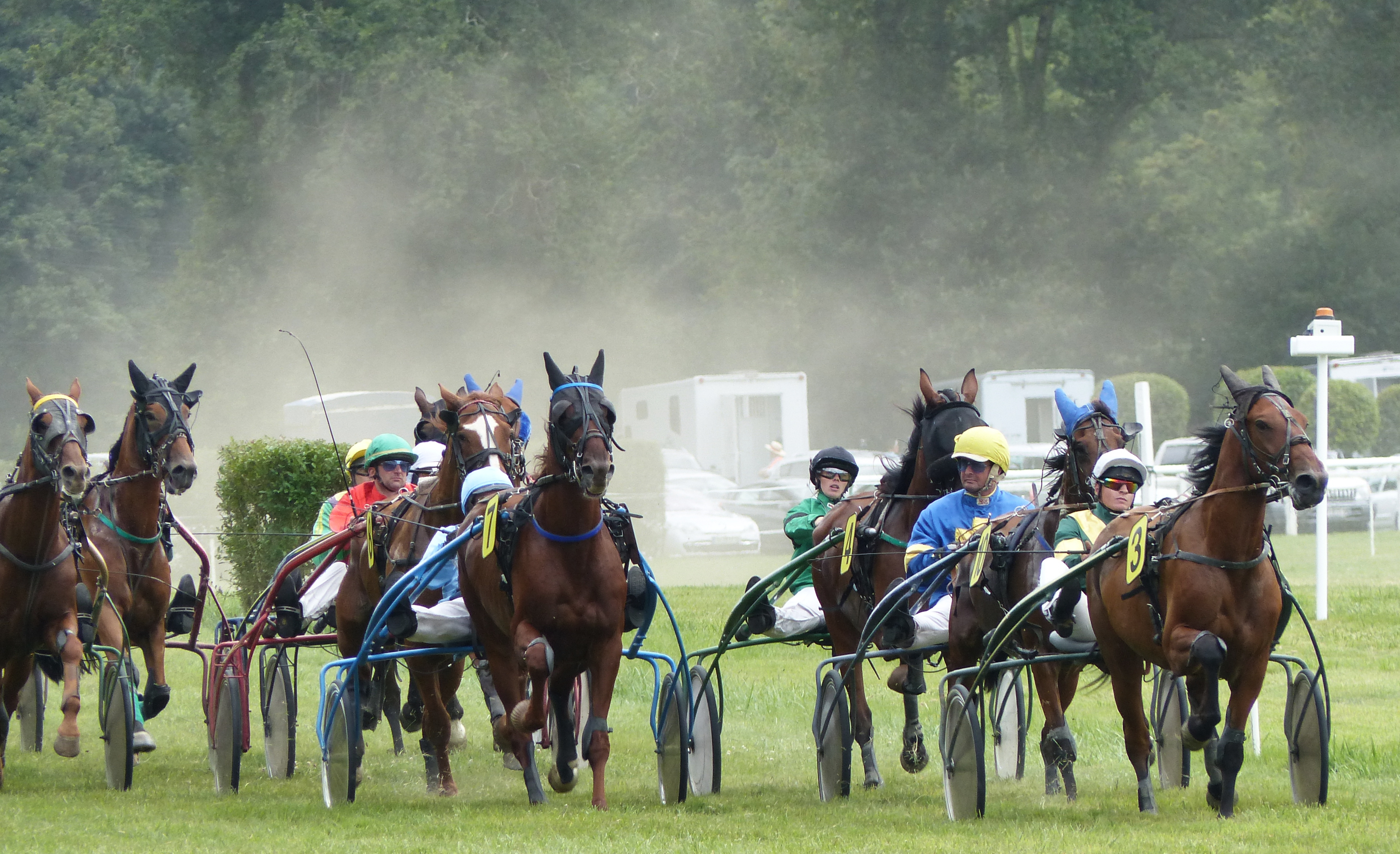
Trotting race at Saint-Jean-des-Prés racecourse.

The equestrian sport employs 145 trainers, and there are 29 racing companies at Brittany's racecourses. Brittany has the distinction of having numerous racecourses, which organize 740 races each year, representing 4 million euros in sales for PMU. In 2010, 12,880 races were run in administrative Brittany. Racehorse training facilities have generally been in existence for quite some time, on average since 1989. Sales generated by race trainers alone amounted to €38,155,506. The most active racecourses in Brittany are Saint-Brieuc (Hippodrome de la Baie), Saint-Malo (Hippodrome de Marville) and Maure-de-Bretagne (Hippodrome des Bruyères), which organize 10 meetings a year.

=== Equestrian sports ===
==== Endurance ====
Brittany is highly competitive in equestrian endurance, both for its breeding horses and its riders. In France, it is the region with the highest number of competition entries. Raymond Hascoët is a pioneer in breeding for endurance racing. In the 1970s, he imported three mares and the stallion Badr Bedur, who significantly influenced all French bloodlines. His Badera mare gave birth to Roc'h, world endurance champion in 1994 with Stéphane Fleury. The rider went on to become French champion with Habad'h, from the same stud. In 2006, Keroc'h became world champion. Endurance horses born in Brittany, such as Nikel Kermorvan (second in the 2011 FEI world rankings), Mario de Plouvorn (3rd) and Major Armor (18th in the world), are still among the best in the sport. Around 300 endurance horses are born every year. Niac Armor, a 75% Anglo-Arabian mare from the d'Armor breeding farm in Saint-Gilles-Pligeaux (22), was World Youth Endurance Champion in 2013 (in the colors of the United Arab Emirates). The Ollivier family, who run the Armor stud, have won several French and European championship titles. Poly de Coat Frity, also from a small Côtes d'Armor breeding operation, became world champion in May 2015.

Two Breton riders, Élodie Le Labourier and Géraldine Brault, finished second and third at the 2005 European Championships in Compiègne. Élodie Le Labourier, individual bronze medallist at the 2006 World Equestrian Games, was born in Vannes and achieved her first successes at the Huelgoat event. She is the daughter of the president of the Randonneurs de Lanvaux association, which has been based in Moustoir-Ac since 1989. Young Géraldine Brault won the CEI2* at Coatélan-Plougonven in September 2013, then the CEI3* at Fontainebleau over 160 km in March 2014, with Pomoska du Barthas. The Bretons won the team gold medal at the European Young Riders' Championship in 2008. In 2010, the French Young Riders Championship was also won by the Brittany region.

Sarah Chakil competes in 2010 and 2011 for the Dar el Salam stables in Fay-de-Bretagne (44), and is part of the Breton team that won the 160 km Florac event in 2010. Amateur rider Denis Le Guillou, from Quéménéven, took to the saddle for the first time at the age of 39. Crowned French amateur elite champion in 2012 over 130 km, then selected for the 2014 World Equestrian Games, he won the silver medal with the French team. Locmalo-born young rider Noémie Gautier, runner-up at the French National Championships, achieved excellent results in international endurance races during the 2014 season, raising hopes of selection for the French national team.

A sharp increase in participation in endurance events was recorded in 2013. Five Breton endurance riders won a CEI2* or CEI3* that same year. Brittany's endurance professionals work internationally, notably with Morocco, Tunisia and China. Brittany is also home to endurance professionals from many different countries. For example, the Bretagne endurance association welcomed and trained Chinese riders in 2015.

==== Other disciplines ====
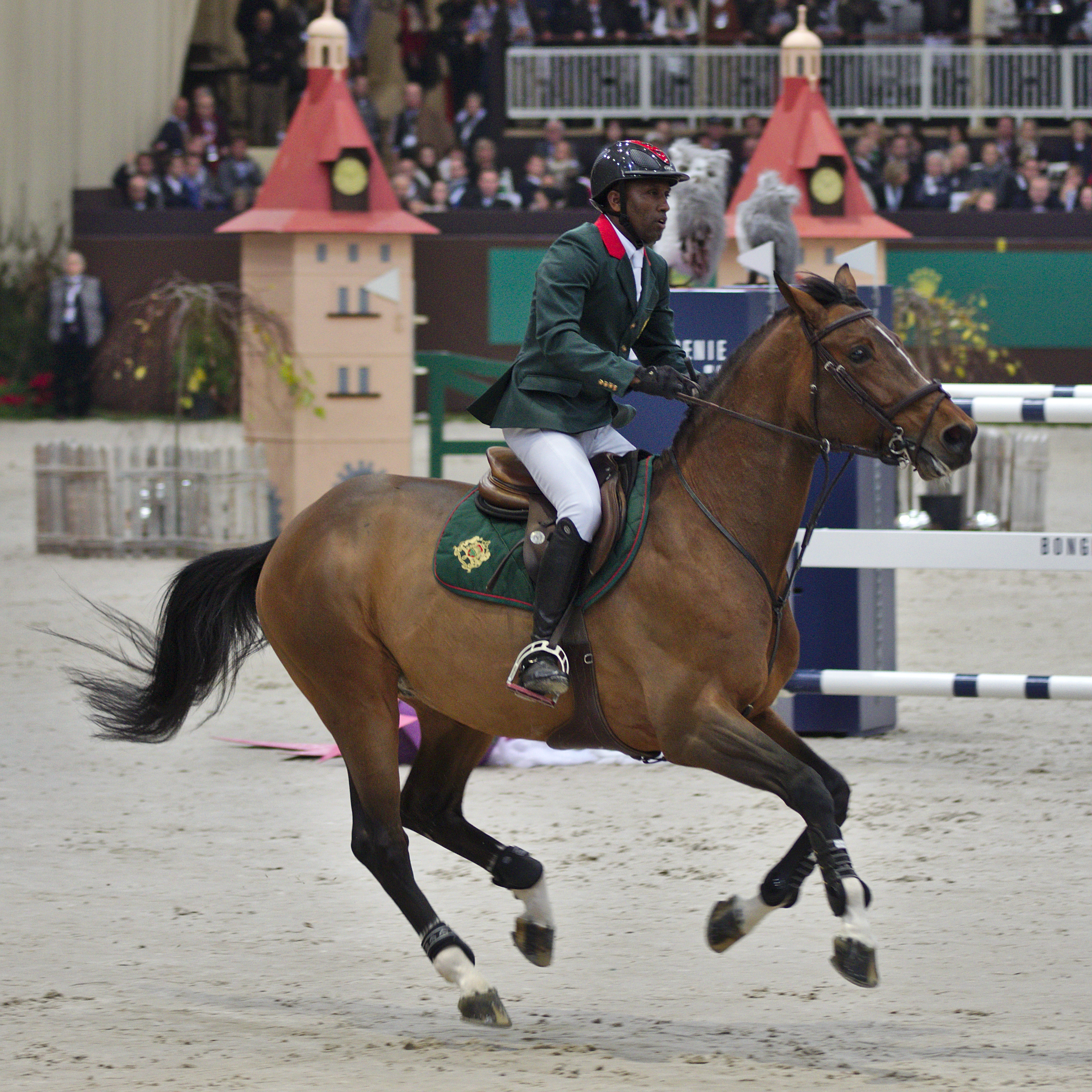
Abdelkebir Ouaddar on Quickly de Kreisker, French Saddle jumper born and bred in Brittany.

Brittany has recently won French championship titles in other equestrian disciplines, notably show jumping and carriage driving. As part of exchanges between the Brittany region and Morocco, King Mohammed VI purchased the French Selle stallion Quickly de Kreisker, trained by Breton rider Benjamin Robert, and entrusted him to Moroccan rider Abdelkebir Ouaddar. In 2013, this Finistère-born show jumping horse won the Morocco Royal Tour. He became the world's No. 1 show jumping horse in the WBFSH rankings in July 2014, a position he lost and then regained for the period from 1 October 2014 to 31 March 2015.

International dressage rider Dominique d'Esmé was born in Rennes. As for multi-medalist of the 1912 Olympic Games Jacques Cariou, he was born in 1870 in Peumerit, Finistère.

== Economy and structures ==
According to 2010–2011 data from the regional economic observatory (OER) affiliated to the Conseil Supérieur du Cheval, some 4,800 jobs in Brittany depend directly on the equestrian sector. This includes 4,148 animal-related structures, 47,800 hectares developed by the equestrian sector, 3,091 livestock farms, and 408 equestrian center-type establishments. Brittany also boasts 5 equestrian centers, 83 professional riders and 93 active farriers. The sector generated annual sales of 201,400,000 euros. There are 26,040 equidae in administrative Brittany. Their mere presence generates additional demand (saddlery, equine feed, equipment) from companies that generate around 50 million euros to supply the industry. In October 2011, Brittany's General Council unanimously adopted a "horse plan" in support of the region. At the end of 2014, the region developed a partnership with Morocco for training in horse-related professions.

Equestrian centers are mainly found on the Breton coast. Their number increased by 28% between 2005 and 2011. They are home to 14,780 animals, which means that the majority of Brittany's equidae belong to the cavalry of an equestrian center. The latter sometimes work in the tourism sector (12%), and much more rarely with tour operators (2%). They generated sales of €37,177,000 in 2011.

== Organizations ==
Various organizations manage aspects of horse breeding in Brittany. As far as riding is concerned, the Association régionale de tourisme équestre de Bretagne (ARTEB) looks after the equestrian tourism and trail-riding sector, with the mission of "developing the taste and practice" and organizing related events. It is also responsible for the creation and protection of riding itineraries and stopover points. The Comité régional d'équitation de Bretagne (CREB), affiliated to the Fédération française d'équitation, manages all aspects of horse riding at regional level. In particular, it offers financial assistance for the modernization of riding schools. There are also departmental associations, such as the AACIV – Association à cheval d'Ille-et-Vilaine, created in July 1989 in Rennes, which aims to bring together all riders in Ille-et-Vilaine and coordinate actions to promote riding in rural areas and safeguard hiking trails.

== Competitions ==
Brittany's regional equestrian committee organizes equestrian sports events: show jumping, eventing, dressage, endurance, hunter riding, TREC, horse-ball, circle vaulting, pony games and various disabled riding events. Show jumping is by far the most popular discipline, accounting for over 90% of competitions.

Dinard has been hosting international show jumping events since 1912. These include the 1985 European Championships and the CSIO Nations' Cup in 1988, 1989, 1990 and 1992. The CSI3* is its most famous annual event. Until 2018, the Breton leg of the Grand National show jumping competition was organized by the Celtik Jump association at the Parc des expositions du Pays de Lorient in Morbihan. It brought together 800 professionals and attracted 7,500 visitors for its 2013 edition, according to its official website. Since then, Équipondi has become Brittany's biggest indoor show jumping competition. Brittany also hosts major endurance events, including the 160 km Landivisiau and the Breizh International Endurance Tour. Equestrian competitions receive slightly more media coverage in the West than in other regions. Since 1985, the daily newspaper Ouest-France has carried a section devoted to equestrian sports, making it an exception in the regional daily press.

== See also ==
- Horses in Brittany
- Equestrianism in France
- Breton horse
- Equitax

== Bibliography ==
- Gast, A. (1907). Essai sur la Bretagne hippique : le postier breton, le cheval de trait, le cheval de sang (in French). C. Amat.
- Garraud, Loïc-Pierre (2012). Le Nord de la Cornouaille: Domaine du roi cheval (in French). Éditions L'Harmattan. ISBN 978-2296503465.
- Houël, Éphrem (1842). Traité complet de l'élève du cheval en Bretagne (in French). E. Tostain.
- Lizet, Bernadette (2003). Mastodonte et fil d'acier. L'épopée du cheval breton (in French). La ricerca folklorica Retoriche dell'animalità. Rhétoriques de l'animalité.
- Rêve de randonnée : Heureux comme un Breton sous le soleil (in French). Equidia Life.
- de Sallier-Dupin, Guy (1998). Le cheval chez les Bretons des Côtes-d'Armor : De l'Ancien régime à la Grande Guerre (in French). Coop Breizh.
- Collectif; Auzias, Dominique; Labourdette, Jean-Paul (2014). La France à cheval 2014 (in French). Petit Futé. ISBN 978-2746971042.
- "Du cheval en Bretagne au cheval Breton". Kreiz Breizh (in French) (4). Mémoires et actualité du Centre Ouest Bretagne Carhaix-Plouguer. 2002. ISSN 1625-4015.
- Le Gall, Myriam. "Cheval de guerre". In Kreiz Breizh (2002), pp. 13–20.
- Saint-Gal de Pons, Antoine-Auguste (1931). Origines du cheval breton. Le Haras de Langonnet. Les Dépôts de Lamballe et d'Hennebont. Le Dépôt de remonte de Guingamp (in French). Celjoarion.
