= Agence de financement des infrastructures de transport de France =

The Agence de financement des infrastructures de transport de France (AFITF) is an établissement public administratif national (EDAN) whose goal is to fund transport projects in France.

Starting from 2013, the AFITF will receive a part of the incomes generated by the taxe poids lourds.

== Creation ==
The creation of the AFITF was decided during the comité interministériel d'aménagement et de développement du territoire (CIADT) of 18 December 2003.

It was created by a décret dated 26 November 2004.

== Projects funded ==
=== 2009 ===
- Construction of the A19 autoroute
- Construction of the Ligne du Haut-Bugey
- Construction of the LGV Rhin-Rhône
- Studies for the second phase of the LGV Est
