= Taxe poids lourds =

French road tax

The taxe poids lourds (TPL) is a tax that was scheduled to be applied to all heavy goods vehicle circulating on some state-financed and locally financed roads in France starting from 1 October 2013. Those roads represent around 15000 kilometers.

The income on state-financed roads should be affected to the agence de financement des infrastructures de transport de France, which would use it partly to fund some loss-making railway lines in France. The income on locally financed roads should go to the local administration that maintains them.

The tax is set up by a law voted on 24 April 2013 by the National Assembly, after several round trips between the Assembly and the Senate.

The company Ecomouv, a subsidiary of Autostrade, is responsible for the tax collection.
