= Third Fillon government =

- 34th Government of France

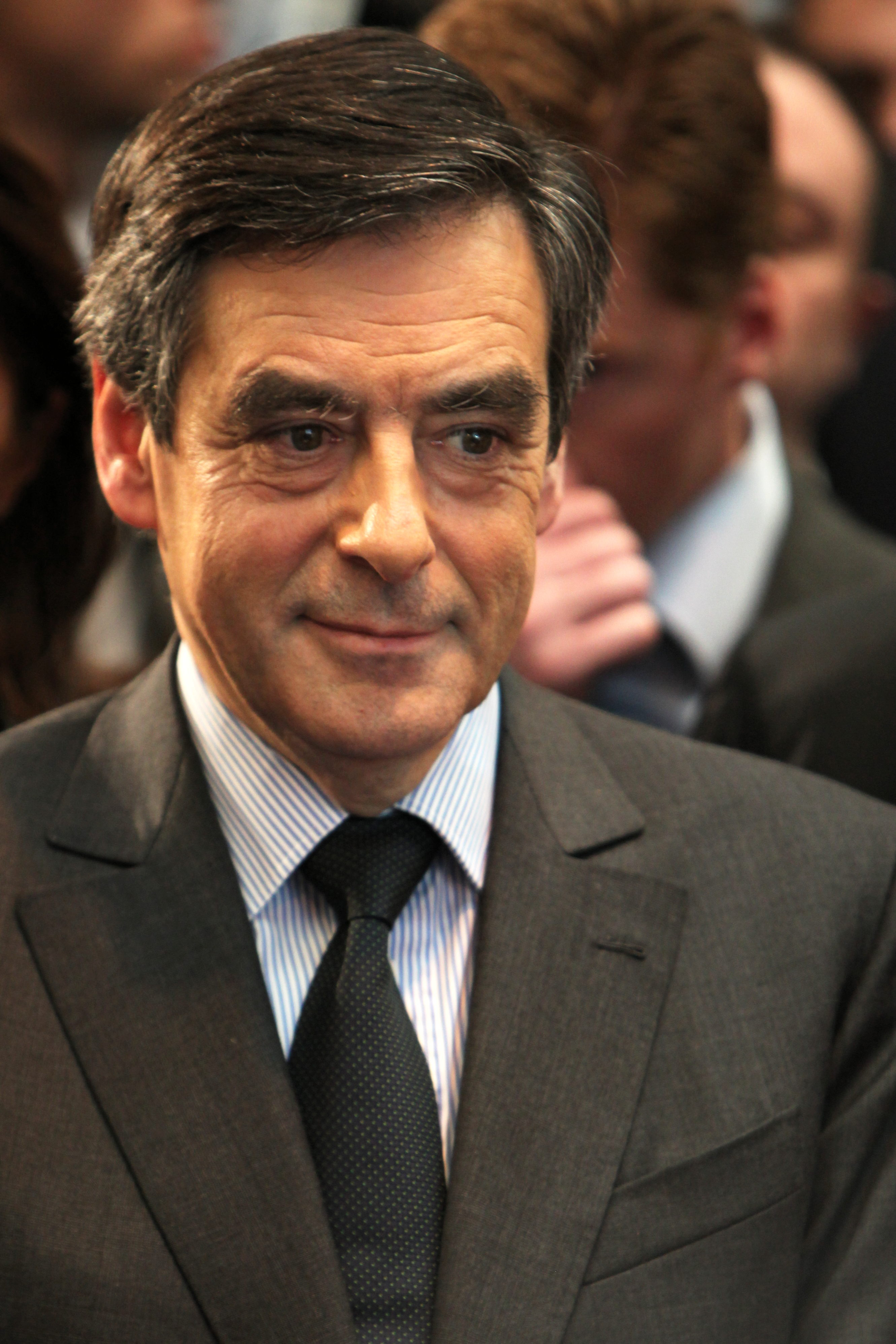
- François Fillon
- Date formed: 14 November 2010
- Date dissolved: 10 May 2012

People and organisations
- Head of state: Nicolas Sarkozy
- Head of government: François Fillon
- No. of ministers: 15
- Member parties: UMP; NC
- Status in legislature: Majority

History
- Predecessor: Second Fillon government
- Successor: First Ayrault government

The Third Fillon government was the 34th government in the Fifth Republic of France. It was formed on 14 November 2010. It is composed of members from the UMP and the NC. On 10 May 2012, following the election defeat of President Nicolas Sarkozy in the 2012 presidential election, François Fillon presented the resignation of the Government. However, the government continued to manage daily affairs until the formation of the First Ayrault government on 16 May 2012.

== Prime minister ==
Post	Name	Party
Prime Minister	François Fillon	UMP

== Ministers ==
Post	Name	Party
Minister of Foreign Affairs	Michèle Alliot-Marie (until 27 February 2011); Alain Juppé	UMP
Minister of National Education	Luc Chatel	UMP
Minister of Justice; Keeper of the Seals	Michel Mercier	DVD
Minister of Defence and Veterans Affairs	Alain Juppé (until 27 February 2011); Gérard Longuet	UMP
Minister of the Economy and Finances	Christine Lagarde (until 29 June 2011); François Baroin	UMP
Minister of Labour, Employment and Health	Xavier Bertrand	UMP
Minister of Ecology, Sustainable Development and Energy	Nathalie Kosciusko-Morizet (until 22 February 2012); Francois Fillon	UMP
Minister of Budget, Public Accounts and Civil Administration; Spokesperson of the Government	François Baroin (until 29 June 2011); Valérie Pécresse	UMP
Minister of the Interior; Minister of Overseas France	Brice Hortefeux (until 27 February 2011); Claude Guéant	UMP
Minister of Agriculture, Food, Fisheries, Rural Affairs and Spatial Planning	Bruno Le Maire	UMP
Minister of Solidarity and Social Cohesion	Roselyne Bachelot	UMP
Minister of Public Service	François Sauvadet	NC
Minister of Culture and Communication	Frédéric Mitterrand	DVG
Minister of Higher Education and Research	Valérie Pécresse (until 29 June 2011); Laurent Wauquiez	UMP
Minister of City Affairs	Maurice Leroy	NC
Minister of Sports	Chantal Jouanno (until 26 September 2011); David Douillet	UMP

== Junior Ministers ==
Post	Ministry	Name	Party
Minister for Relations with Parliament	Prime Minister	Patrick Ollier	UMP
Minister for Industry, Energy and the Digital Economy	Economy, Finances and Industry	Eric Besson	UMP
Minister in charge of Co-operation	Foreign Affairs	Henri de Raincourt	UMP
Minister for Local Authorities	Interior	Philippe Richert	UMP
Minister of Learning and Training	Labour, Employment and Health	Nadine Morano	UMP
Minister for European Affairs	Foreign Affairs	Laurent Wauquiez (until 29 June 2011); Jean Leonetti	UMP
Minister of Overseas	Interior	Marie-Luce Penchard	UMP
Minister for Housing	Ecology, Sustainable Development and Energy	Benoist Apparu	UMP
Minister of Transport	Ecology, Sustainable Development and Energy	Thierry Mariani	UMP

== Secretaries of State ==
Post	Ministry	Name	Party
Secretary of State for Foreign Trade	Economy, Finances and Industry	Pierre Lellouche	UMP
Secretary of State for Health	Labour, Employment and Health	Nora Berra	UMP
Secretary of State	Solidarity and Social Cohesion	Marie-Anne Montchamp	UMP
Secretary of State for Trade, Crafts, Small and Medium Enterprises, Tourism, Services, Liberal Professions and Consumer	Economy, Finances and Industry	Frédéric Lefebvre	UMP
Secretary of State	Defence and Veterans Affairs	Marc Laffineur	UMP
Secretary of State for the Family	Solidarity and Social Cohesion	Claude Greff	UMP
Secretary of State for Youth and Associative Life	National Education	Jeannette Bougrab	UMP
Secretary of French citizens who live outside of the French territories	Foreign Affairs	David Douillet (until 28 September 2011); Edouard Courtial	UMP

Preceded by Second Fillon government	Government of France; 2010–2012	Succeeded by First Ayrault government
