= Serge Boucheny =

French politician (1929–2025)

Member of the French Senate for Paris
- In office 26 June 1969 – 1 October 1986
- Preceded by: Raymond Bossus

Deputy of the French National Assembly for Paris's 14th constituency
- In office 3 April 1967 – 30 May 1968
- Preceded by: Hubert Germain
- Succeeded by: Hubert Germain

Personal details
- Born: 22 March 1929; Paris, France
- Died: 7 September 2025 (aged 96); Paris, France
- Political party: PCF
- Occupation: Grinding operator

Serge Boucheny (French: [sɛʁʒ buʃəni]; 22 March 1929 – 7 September 2025) was a French politician of the French Communist Party (PCF).

A lifetime resident of Paris, Boucheny served in the National Assembly from 1967 to 1968 and was a Senator from 1969 to 1986.

Boucheny died in the 13th arrondissement of Paris on 7 September 2025, at the age of 96.
