= Michel Caldaguès =

French politician (1926–2012)

- [[File:[CALDAGUÈS Michel.jpg|frameless|upright=1]]

Mayor of the 1st arrondissement of Paris
- In office 13 March 1983 – 29 March 2000
- Preceded by: None
- Succeeded by: Jean-François Legaret

Member of the National Assembly for Paris's 5th constituency
- In office 30 June 1968 – 1 April 1973
- Preceded by: Édouard Frédéric-Dupont
- Succeeded by: Édouard Frédéric-Dupont

Personal details
- Born: 28 September 1926 8th arrondissement of Paris, France
- Died: 22 September 2012 (aged 85) 15th arrondissement of Paris, France
- Party: UDR; RPR

Michel Caldaguès (28 September 1926 – 22 September 2012) was a French politician.

== Political opinions ==
He endorsed Marine Le Pen's campaign in the 2007 French legislative election.
