= Roger Romani =

French politician (1934–2025)

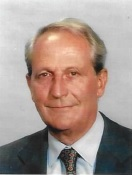
Roger Romani

Roger Romani (25 August 1934 – 20 February 2025) was a member of the Senate of France, representing the city of Paris. He was a member of the Union for a Popular Movement. He served as a vice-president of the Senate.
