= Raymond Bossus =

French politician (1903–1981)

Raymond Bossus (25 July 1903 – 6 February 1981) was a French politician.

Bossus served on the Senate as a representative of the Seine department from 8 June 1958 to 26 April 1959. He was called to replace Roger Garaudy of Paris on 1 November 1962, remaining in office until 25 June 1969, when his own resignation took effect, and was in turn succeeded by Serge Boucheny.
