= Jean-Pierre Caffet =

French politician

Member of the French Senate for Paris
- In office 1 October 2004 – 1 October 2017

President of Socialist Group in the Council of Paris
- In office 2008–2014
- Mayor: Bertrand Delanoë
- Preceded by: Patrick Bloche
- Succeeded by: Rémi Féraud

Personal details
- Born: 8 November 1951 (age 74) Algiers, French Algeria
- Party: La République En Marche! Socialist Party
- Education: ENSAE ParisTech

Jean-Pierre Caffet (French pronunciation: [ʒɑ̃ pjɛʁ kafɛ]; born 8 November 1951) is a member of the Senate of France, representing the city of Paris between 2004 and 2017. He was a member of the Socialist Party, and moved to LREM in 2017.

== Bibliography ==
- Page on the Senate website (in French)
