= French school holidays =

French school holidays are the periods when schools in France, and all the pupils in them, have a holiday. The dates are fixed nationally by the Ministry of Education for a period of three years. Holiday dates are given as a Saturday date "after classes", as some schools have lessons on Saturday mornings, and return on a Monday morning.

The fixed dates can lead to over-crowding in tourist resorts such as the Mediterranean coast and the ski resorts, and price increases and availability problems in travel and accommodations. To alleviate this problem, holiday schedules for the "winter" and "spring" holidays in February and April, respectively, are staggered by dividing the country into three zones. Nevertheless, the synchronized school holiday schedules still cause some crowding effects as families head to popular holiday locations, especially in the summer at the beginning and end of the months in July and August when the traffic jams are a regular feature of the news bulletins.

== Distribution of holidays ==
=== Summer holidays ===
The summer holidays officially begin in early July for all state schools and all students, whatever their age or type of school start their new school year at the beginning of September. Teachers return on 1 September, pupils usually on 2 September, but that might vary depending on how the weekend falls.

=== All Saints holidays ===
All Saints holidays start on the last weekend of October before 1 November and last two weeks since 2012 (before it lasted a week and a half).

=== Christmas holidays ===
Christmas holidays last two weeks encompassing Christmas and New Year. They are always full weeks.

=== Winter holidays ===
Winter holidays last two weeks and are distributed in France depending on zones between the second week of February and the first week of March.

=== Easter holidays (Spring holidays) ===
Easter holidays last two weeks and are distributed in France depending on zones between the second week of April and the first week of May.

== Zones ==
French school zones

The three zones (A, B and C) dictate when a school at a particular location will have its holiday. The zones are not contiguous areas of France, but are designed to split the population evenly.

=== Zone A ===
Zone A includes Besançon, Bordeaux, Clermont-Ferrand, Dijon, Grenoble, Limoges, Lyon and Poitiers.

=== Zone B ===
Zone B includes Aix-Marseille, Amiens, Caen, Lille, Nancy-Metz, Nantes, Nice, Orléans-Tours, Reims, Rennes, Rouen and Strasbourg.

=== Zone C ===
Paris, Versailles and Créteil, along with Montpellier and Toulouse in the South West.

== Corsica and overseas departments and territories ==
Corsica and overseas departments and territories define differently their school calendars. Whereas it is the Ministry of National Education which decides when will be holidays in metropolitan France, Corsica, French Polynesia, Guadeloupe, French Guiana, Martinique, Mayotte, New Caledonia, Réunion, Saint Pierre and Miquelon and Wallis and Futuna holidays can be adapted by decree by the local Director of Education for a span of three years.

For instance, school years in New Caledonia and Wallis and Futuna start in January and end in December.

== See also ==
- School holidays
