= Bonnets Rouges =

French anti-tax protest movement

Flag of the bonnets rouges

The bonnets rouges (French: [bɔnɛ ʁuʒ]; "red caps") movement began in October 2013 in Brittany. It was a protest movement, largely targeting a new environmental tax on transport by heavy-goods vehicle by the French government. This tax was to be enforced in part by gantries set up on highways to detect vehicles carrying heavy loads and the presence of the required billing apparatuses. Through a combination of demonstrations and violent actions, including the destruction of many of these tax gantries, the movement forced the French government to rescind the tax.

The protesters considered the tax harmful to Breton agriculture, which was already having a difficult time competing with its counterparts in Europe. They wore red caps, in reference to the seventeenth-century revolt of the papier timbré, which was particularly active in Brittany, though the Phrygian cap as a protest symbol goes back much further.

== Activity ==
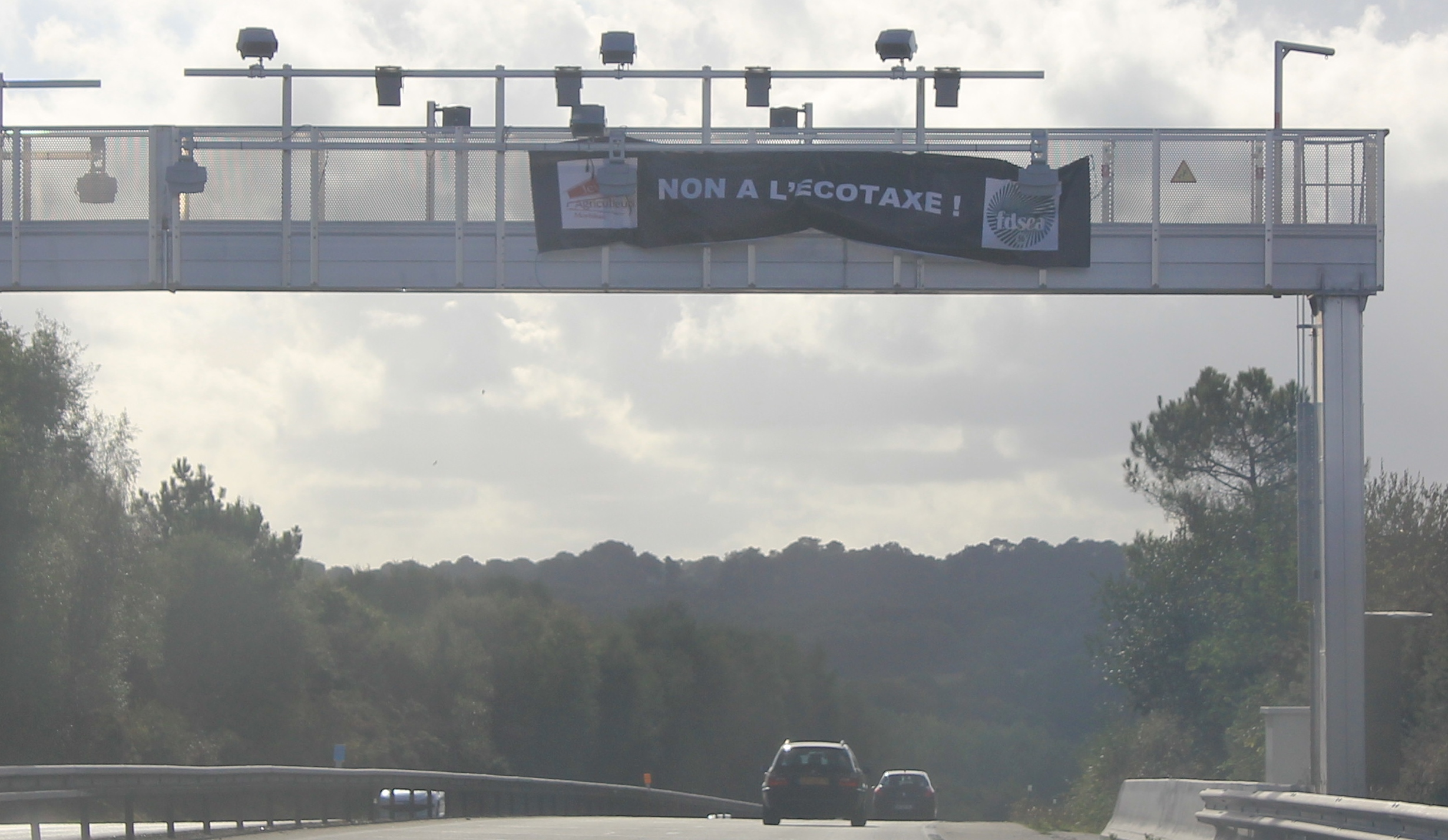
An anti-tax sign affixed to an "ecotaxe" gantry a few days before it was destroyed

Hundreds of red-cap-wearing demonstrators protested against the highway tax gantry at Pont-de-Buis on 28 October 2013, and during the course of the protest a demonstrator had his hand blown off when he picked up a grenade thrown by law enforcement.

Soon after the French government announced that it would be temporarily suspending the new tax until 2015 at the earliest.

This did not satisfy the demonstrators, who went on to destroy more than two dozen tax gantries and many smaller radar-camera-like outposts, by the first week of November. These would typically be destroyed by fire, often by filling tires stacked at their bases with flammable material and lighting them. Sometimes, less-destructive means were used, such as wrapping the radar cameras in plastic and topping them with bonnets rouges of their own.

By late November 46 tax radars and gantries had been destroyed and other anti-tax groups were beginning their own direct action, including farmers and equestrians, who disrupted traffic in Paris with their tractors and horses.

At the end of November the movement massed in Carhaix and simultaneously used shipping trucks to blockade highways throughout France. At one point the demonstrators held an auction at which they sold off bits and pieces of previously destroyed road tax gantries as souvenirs.

In an amusing moment, a hundred employees of Ecomouv, the quasi-private company responsible for collecting the new tax, held a holiday party in Metz. Posing for a group photo in front of the company offices in their Santa Claus hats, they were mistaken by police for a demonstration of the bonnets rouges, and they quickly intervened.

By January the number of highway tax and radar-ticket machines destroyed had topped 200. This had the desired effect. In 2013, for the first time since ticket-giving radar cameras had been installed in France, the number of tickets issued by the machines declined.

The government made its first big counterattacks in the Spring. Eleven suspected bonnets rouges were arrested and charged with conspiracy in April. The following month, the government convicted Samantha Prime of participating in the destruction of a radar outpost.

Destruction of highway tax gantries, however, continued. The eleven conspirators were convicted and sentenced to between four and 18 months imprisonment, along with a total of about €10,000 in fines. The same day the sentences were declared, farmers in Brittany invaded the city of Morlaix, dumped their produce in big piles in the streets, set fire to the tax office, and blockaded the area to keep fire trucks from responding.

In September and October, three other French tax offices were put to the torch, and French tax officials complained of feeling threatened.

The French government finally decided, in late October, to abandon the hated tax entirely. The cost to the government was enormous. In addition to the loss of anticipated revenue from the tax (€390 million per year) and the property damage and other costs associated with the demonstrations, the government was required to pay compensation to Ecomouv, the quasi-private company that had contracted to administer the tax, and others — nearly one billion euros in all.
