= Chantal Jouanno =

French politician (born 1969)

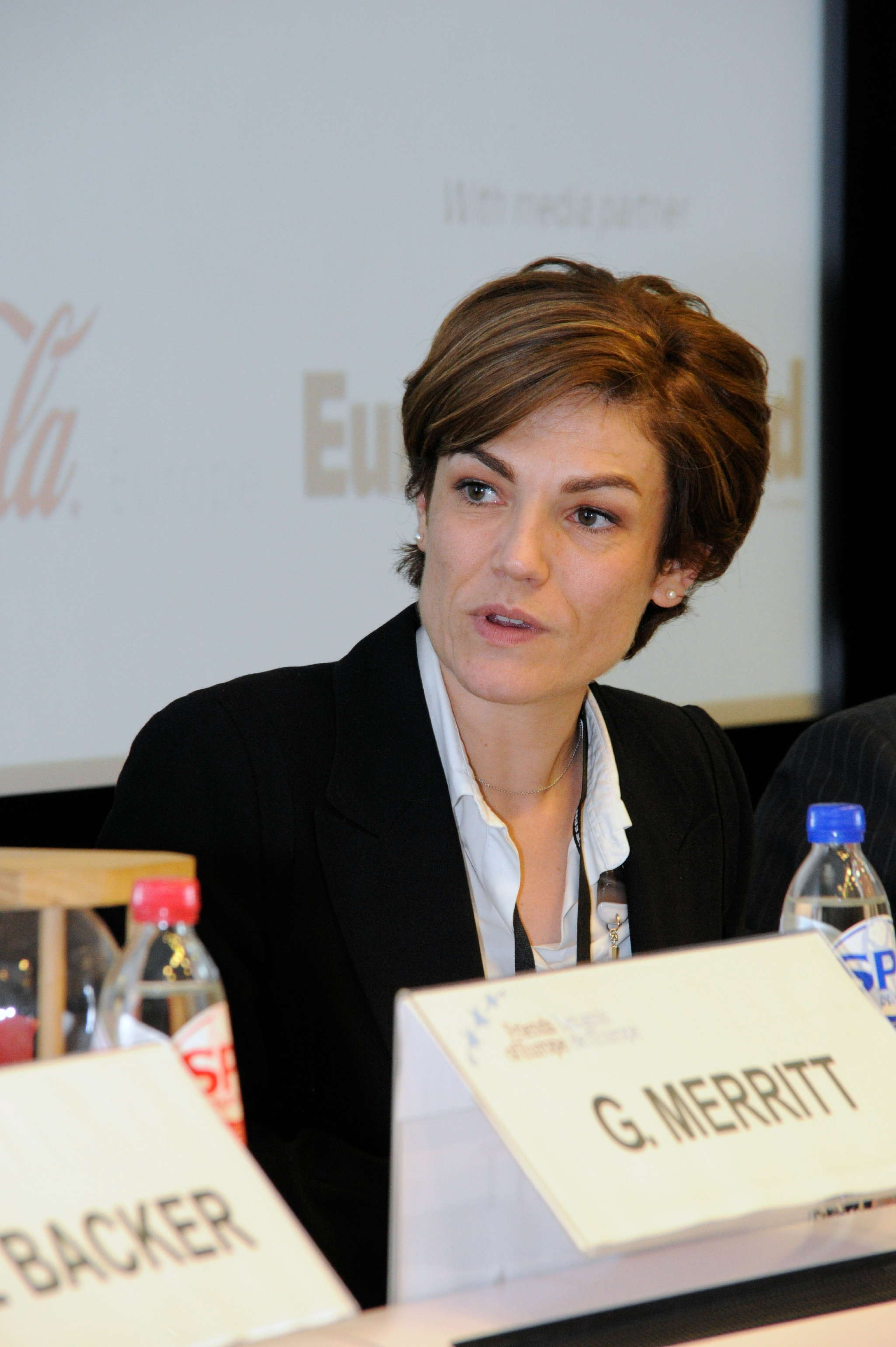
- Chantal Jouanno in 2010

Member of the French Senate for Paris
- In office 1 October 2011 – 1 October 2017

French Minister of Sports
- In office 2010–2011
- President: Nicolas Sarkozy
- Prime Minister: François Fillon
- Preceded by: Roselyne Bachelot
- Succeeded by: David Douillet

Personal details
- Born: Chantal Paul; 12 July 1969 (age 57) Vernon, France
- Party: UDI
- Spouse: Hervé Jouanno (m. 1996)
- Education: Sciences Po, ÉNA

Chantal Jouanno (French pronunciation: [ʃɑ̃tal ʒwano]; née Paul; born 12 July 1969 in Vernon, Eure, France) is a French politician who served as Minister of Sports in the government of Prime Minister François Fillon from 14 November 2010 and 26 September 2011, succeeding to Roselyne Bachelot and being replaced by David Douillet, before taking office as senator on 1 October 2011. She was a close ally of president Sarkozy and former president of ADEME.

== Martial arts practitioner ==
Jouanno is a former karate champion, being a twelve-time French champion in her category. On 7 March 2010, she became karate French Team Champion together with her teammates Véronique Mesnil De Vido and Léna Pyrée.

== Political career ==
=== Career in government, 2009–2011 ===
From 21 January 2009 to 14 November 2010, Jouanno served as Minister for Ecology in the second government of François Fillon, succeeding Nathalie Kosciusko-Morizet.

As Minister of Sports, Jouanno launched two inquiries with the French Football Federation (FFF) into allegations that the national team coach, Laurent Blanc, and others from the federation had discussed introducing racial quotas at training academies for young French players with dual nationality.

In addition to her roles in national government, Jouanno served as regional councillor of Île-de-France from 2010 until 2017.

=== Member of the Senate, 2011–2017 ===
In response to public outrage over a photo display in Vogue that featured under-age girls in sexy clothes and postures, Minister of Health Nora Berra commissioned Jouanno to write a report on the "hypersexualization" of children in 2011.

During the 2012 Presidential election, Jouanno suggested if she had to choose between a Socialist candidate and a National Front one, she would vote Socialist. This comment was interpreted by Sarkozy supporters such as Francois Fillon as being critical of Sarkozy's attempts to woo National Front supporters.

In October 2012, Jouanno announced leaving the UMP party to join the newly created centre-right party UDI, led by Jean-Louis Borloo, as vice-president. In 2013, Borloo included Jouanno in his shadow cabinet; in this capacity, she served as opposition counterpart to Minister of Foreign Affairs Laurent Fabius.

In the Republicans' 2016 presidential primaries, Jouanno endorsed Nathalie Kosciusko-Morizet as the center-right parties' candidate for the 2017 French presidential election but later switched to Alain Juppé.

In 2017, Jouanno announced her intention to resign from active politics.

== Later career ==
In March 2018, Jouanno became President of the Commission nationale du débat public (CNDP). In January 2019, she announced that she was stepping down from one of her roles associated with this position due to compensation issues – that of guiding the national debate in response to the gilet jaunes movement. This announcement came prior to the commencement on 15 January of the great national debate, which was initiated by Emmanuel Macron. As of January 2019, she received 14,666 euros a month in salary, almost equal to the president's salary. Her mandate ended in 2023.
