= Babette de Rozières =

French chef, television presenter and politician (born 1947)

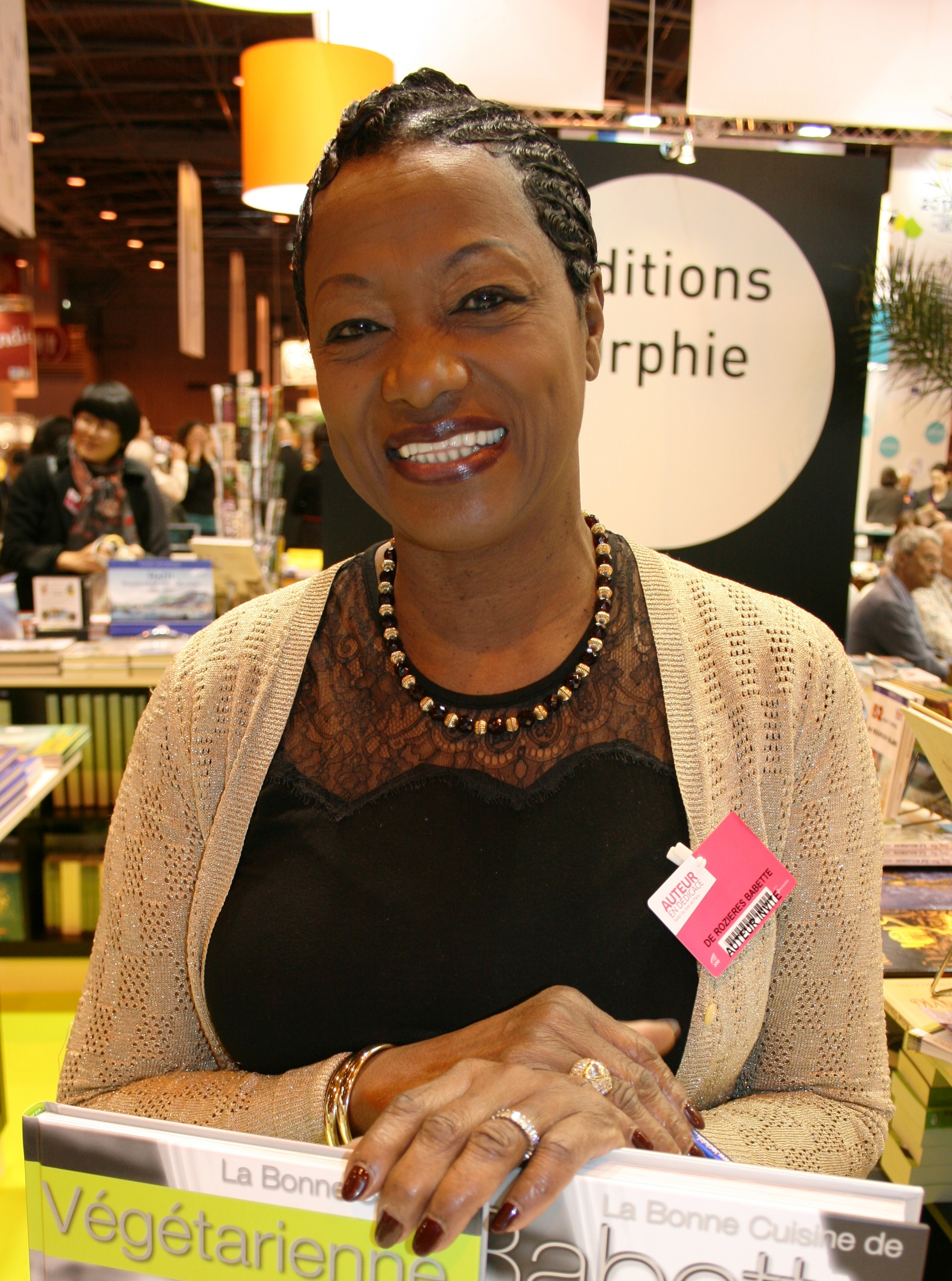
- Babette de Rozières in 2011

Member of the Regional Council of Île-de-France
- Incumbent
- Assumed office 13 December 2015
- President: Valérie Pécresse

Personal details
- Born: Élisabeth Hildebert de Rozières; 27 May 1947 (age 79) Pointe-à-Pitre, Guadeloupe, France
- Party: UDR (2024–present)
- Other political affiliations: LR (2015–2024)
- Spouse: Claude Butin
- Children: 1
- Occupation: Chef • Television presenter • Politician

Élisabeth Hildebert de Rozières, known as Babette de Rozières (born 27 May 1947) is a famous French chef, television presenter and politician.

== Early life ==
She was born in Pointe-à-Pitre in Guadeloupe. She comes from a family of traders, including a grandfather who was a butcher.

She is married to Claude Butin, who is a magistrate.

== Television career ==
Babette de Rozières began her audiovisual career by becoming a scriptwriter for the programs of Maritie and Gilbert Carpentier, a presenter in Guadeloupe, and a production assistant at the Office de radiodiffusion télévision française. Following the dismantling of ORTF, she turned to a culinary career and opened her first restaurant, consisting of a bar and two tables in 1978, not far from the Folies Bergère.

She then opened the Plage des Palmiers in Saint-Tropez, where she only stayed for less than a year, then Le Jardin des gourmets and Le Jardinet in Gosier, Le Clos d'Arbaud and La Petite Rhumerie in Basse-Terre in Guadeloupe. Babette de Rozières sold her four Guadeloupean restaurants to open La Villa créole in Paris as well as La Table de Babette in 1993 in Poissy in Yvelines, which she sold in 2005 following a fire.

From 1987 to 1990, she was one of the guests on the weekly culinary show When it's good?... There's no better!, broadcast on FR3 and hosted by François Roboth. Then she hosted culinary shows including Les P'tits Secrets de Babette for France 3 in 1990, columns with Sophie Davant in the show C'est au program and Télématin on France 2, C'est Meilleur le matin on France 3, and for three years La Cuisine de Babette on Gourmet TV, Joël Robuchon's channel.

In 2005, she bought Le Jamin, a restaurant created by Joël Robuchon, then sold it in 2009. She opened a restaurant in Paris under the same name as the one in Poissy and plans to franchise La Table de Babette in Dubai, Las Vegas and Tangier.

In 2011, she opened the restaurant La case de Babette in Maule (Yvelines). At the end of 2015, while two former employees appealed to the industrial tribunal against the restaurant, Babette de Rozières defended herself from being "neither the owner, nor the manager, nor an employee" and from only lending his image at the restaurant.

In 2016, she hosted À l'aide Babette, a cooking show on France Ô.

Since March 4, 2023, she has hosted the Libre journal de la Gastronomie et du Bien-être on Radio Courtoisie, every Sunday morning from 10:30 a.m. to noon with actress Katia Tchenko, Claude Butin and Éleonore Tchenko. The hosts "put their feet in it" about a meat or vegetable: by describing its origin, production and food uses as well as its nutritional and cosmetic benefits, if not clothing benefits. Babette de Rozières finally offers a recipe made in pseudo-live.

On April 27, 2023, she published her essay The Hidden Face of Politics in Île-de-France.

== Political career ==
She was elected to the regional council of Île-de-France in 2015.

She contested Paris's 17th constituency at the 2017 French legislative election but came in sixth place in the first round.

She is a part of the presidential campaign of Valérie Pécresse for the 2022 French presidential election. She also supported her campaign for President of the Regional Council of Île-de-France.

She was a candidate in the 2024 French legislative election in Yvelines's 7th constituency for the National UDR

== Electoral record ==
Legislative Election 2017: Paris's 17th constituency
Party	Candidate	Votes	%	±%
LREM	Béatrice Faillés	8,172	30.99	N/A
LFI	Danièle Obono	4,481	17.00	N/A
PCF	Ian Brossat	2,730	10.35	−2.84
PS	Colombe Brossel	2,375	9.01	−37.10
DVG	Daniel Vaillant	1,740	6.60	N/A
LR	Babette De Rozieres	1,722	6.53	−11.76
EELV	Douchka Markovic	1,670	6.33	−2.00
FN	Vanessa Lancelot	1,252	4.75	−1.25
Others	N/A	2,224		
Turnout		26,878	46.15	−5.74
2nd round result
LFI	Danièle Obono	11,360	50.71	N/A
LREM	Béatrice Faillés	11,041	49.29	N/A
Turnout		23,886	41.01	−6.75
LFI gain from PS		Swing		
