= List of pro-Palestinian protests in France =

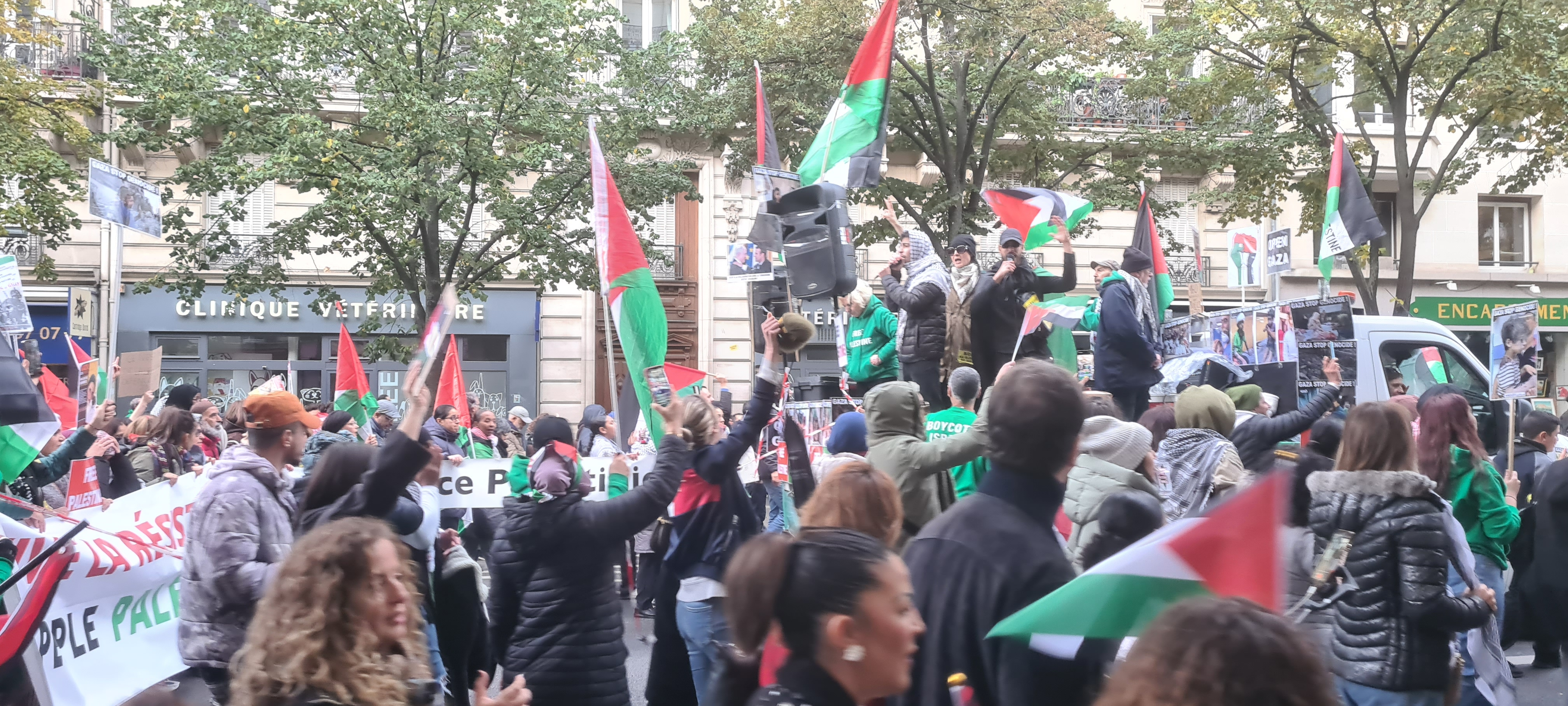
March in Paris, 11 November 2023.

This is a list of pro-Palestinian protests in France including demonstrations, marches, sit-ins, direct actions, and campus encampments in support of Palestinian rights.

== List ==
Estimated attendance is either mentioned explicitly in the references or a midpoint is used, i.e., 50 when dozens are mentioned, 500 when hundreds are mentioned, and so on.

=== Pre-2023 ===
Date	City/town	Estimated attendance	Description	Ref(s)
20 June 1982	Paris	?	Demonstration and march through the city center. Protesters also protested for peace in Lebanon.	
1 May 1986	Paris	?	March through the city center as part of the International Workers' Day parade.	
30 March 1994	Paris	?	Rally in support of Palestinians.	
6 April 2002	Paris	30,000	Demonstration in the city center. Protesters demanded the withdrawal of Israel from Palestinian territories.	
2 March 2008	Paris	500	Demonstration in the city center.	
28 December 2008	Paris	1,400	Demonstration in the city center in reaction to the Israeli military operation in the Gaza Strip.	
29 December 2008	Nantes	700	Demonstration and march through the city center.	
29 December 2008	Lyon	1,000-2,000	Demonstration in the city center.	
29 December 2008	Paris	3,500-5,000	Demonstration and march through the city center.	
3 January 2009	Paris	20,000	Demonstration and march through the city center.	
10 January 2009	Agen	?	Demonstration in the city center.	
10 January 2009	Albi	?	Demonstration in the city center.	
10 January 2009	Angoulême	?	Demonstration in the city center.	
10 January 2009	Auch	?	Demonstration in the city center.	
10 January 2009	Besançon	?	Demonstration in the city center.	
10 January 2009	Colmar	?	Demonstration in the city center.	
10 January 2009	Caen	?	Demonstration in the city center.	
10 January 2009	Évry	?	Demonstration in the city center.	
10 January 2009	Le Creusot	?	Demonstration in the city center.	
10 January 2009	Nantes	?	Demonstration in the city center.	
10 January 2009	Pau	?	Demonstration in the city center.	
10 January 2009	Roanne	?	Demonstration in the city center.	
10 January 2009	Strasbourg	?	Demonstration in the city center.	
10 January 2009	Toulouse	1,600-4,000	Demonstration and march through the city center.	
10 January 2009	Bordeaux	1,800-8,000	Demonstration and march through the city center.	
10 January 2009	Rouen	2,000	Demonstration and march through the city center.	
10 January 2009	Marseille	2,000-5,000	Demonstration and march through the city center.	
10 January 2009	Nice	2,500-6,000	Demonstration and march through the city center. Some protesters defaced the windows of a McDonald's restaurant.	
10 January 2009	Grenoble	3,500	Demonstration and march through the city center.	
10 January 2009	Lyon	8,000-10,000	Demonstration and march through the city center.	
10 January 2009	Lille	10,000	Demonstration and march through the city center.	
10 January 2009	Paris	30,000-100,000	Demonstration and march through the city center.	
5 June 2010	Bordeaux	1,000	Demonstration in the city center.	
5 June 2010	Marseille	1,000	Demonstration in the city center.	
5 June 2010	Montpellier	1,000	Demonstration in the city center.	
5 June 2010	Nice	2,000	Demonstration in the city center.	
5 June 2010	Paris	5,000	Demonstration and march through the city center.	
13 July 2014	Paris	10,000	Demonstration outside a synagogue where a pro-Israel event was taking place. Ended with police intervention.	
19 July 2014	Paris	2,000-3,000	Demonstration in the city center. Ended with police intervention. Some protesters were arrested.	
23 July 2014	Paris	14,500-25,000	Demonstration and march through the city center. Ended with police intervention. Ten protesters were arrested.	
24 May 2017	Pau	?	Demonstration in front of the prefecture in support of Palestinian political prisoners and against the Brussels NATO summit.	
9 December 2017	Paris	1,500-2,000	Demonstration at the Place de la République against a visit of Benjamin Netanyahu.	
16 December 2017	Strasbourg	150	Demonstration in front of the American consulate in solidarity with Palestine and against Trump's recognition of Jerusalem as capital of Israel.	
16 December 2017	Grenoble	200	Demonstration and march through the city center in solidarity with Palestine and against Trump's recognition of Jerusalem as capital of Israel.	
16 December 2017	Bordeaux	300	Demonstration and march through the city center in solidarity with Palestine and against Trump's recognition of Jerusalem as capital of Israel.	
16 December 2017	Paris	1500	Demonstration and march through the city center in solidarity with Palestine and against Trump's recognition of Jerusalem as capital of Israel.	
1 April 2018	Paris	300	Demonstration at the Place de la République against the killing of demonstrators in Gaza by the Israeli army.	
1 May 2018	Paris	?	March through the city center as part of the International Workers' Day parade.	
12 May 2018	Grenoble	100	Demonstration and march through the city center in commemoration of the Nakba and in support of the March of Return.	
12 May 2018	Toulouse	500	Demonstration and march through the city center in commemoration of the Nakba and in support of the March of Return.	
12 May 2018	Paris	2,000	Demonstration and march through the city center in commemoration of the Nakba and in support of the March of Return.	
17 May 2018	Paris	2,000	Demonstration at Place de la République and at the Trocadéro.	
19 May 2018	Strasbourg	150	Demonstration at Place Kléber.	
5 June 2018	Paris	?	Demonstration and march through the city center against a visit of Benjamin Netanyahu.	
5 June 2018	Pau	70	Demonstration in front of the prefecture against a visit of Benjamin Netanyahu.	
17 April 2019	Pau	100	Demonstration in the city center in solidarity with Palestinian political prisoners in Israel. Protesters also demanded the release of Lebanese militant Georges Abdallah arrested in France.	
18 April 2019	Paris	100	Demonstration in the city center in solidarity with Palestinian children imprisoned by Israel.	
20 April 2019	Strasbourg	30	Demonstration in the city center in solidarity with Palestinian political prisoners.	
30 June 2019	Paris	50	Demonstration in the city center against the inauguration of a Jerusalem square in the city.	
19 October 2019	Lannemezan	500	Demonstration and march towards the Lannemezan prison to demand the release of Georges Abdallah.	
27 June 2020	Paris	2,500-3,000	Demonstration and march through the city center against Israel's annexation of Palestinian territories.	
10 September 2020	Paris	50	Demonstration at the Pont des Invalides against the United Arab Emirates recognition of Israel.	
27 March 2021	Strasbourg	?	Demonstration in the city center.	
12 May 2021	Paris	200	Demonstration at the Les Invalides in support of Palestine following attacks on Al-Aqsa and the Gaza Strip. Ended with police intervention. An organizer of the protest was arrested. Several protesters were fined.	
15 May 2021	Lyon	1,000	Demonstration in the city center. Ended with police intervention. Some protesters were arrested.	
15 May 2021	Nantes	1,000	Demonstration in the city center. Ended with police intervention. Some protesters were arrested.	
15 May 2021	Marseille	1,500	Demonstration in the city center. Ended with police intervention. Some protesters were arrested.	
15 May 2021	Strasbourg	4,000	Demonstration in the city center. Ended with police intervention. Some protesters were arrested.	
15 May 2021	Paris	2,500-5,000	Demonstration in the city center, a day after a French court banned protests in support of Palestine. Ended with police intervention, including the use of tear gas and water cannons. 44 protesters were arrested.	
21 May 2021	Nanterre	100	Demonstration in the city center.	
21 May 2021	Saint-Dié-des-Vosges	200	Occupation of the Pont de la République.	
22 May 2021	Pau	150	Demonstration in the city center.	
22 May 2021	Paris	2,000	Demonstration in the city center.	
23 May 2021	Strasbourg	1,000	Demonstration in the city center.	
27 November 2021	Paris	150	Demonstration at the Pont de la République in solidarity with Palestinian children imprisoned by Israel.	
1 May 2022	Bordeaux	?	March through the city center as part of the International Workers' Day parade.	
25 October 2022	Paris	50	Demonstration at Place Saint Augustin. Protesters handed approximately 37,000 signatures demanding the release of Palestinian children imprisoned by Israel.	
4 December 2022	Nanterre	50	Demonstration at Place Gabriel Péri.	

=== 2023 ===
Date	City/town	Estimated attendance	Description	Ref(s)
14 February 2023	Paris	50	Demonstration outside the parliament against a visit of Benjamin Netanyahu.	
4 March 2023	Grenoble	100	Demonstration and march through the city center against attacks by Israeli settlers on Palestinian villages, including the recent attack in Huwara.	
18 March 2023	Argenteuil	?	Demonstration outside the sub-prefecture.	
2 April 2023	Nanterre	50	Demonstration at Place Gabriel Péri.	
1 May 2023	Paris	?	March through the city center as part of the International Workers' Day parade.	
5 July 2023	Pau	?	Demonstration along the route of the 2023 Tour de France, which the protesters called a "whitewashing operation for Israeli crimes".	
10 October 2023	Paris	500	Demonstration at the Place de la République.	
12 October 2023	Paris	3,000	Demonstration in the city center despite the ban on pro-Palestinian protests by the government. Ended with police intervention, including the use of tear gas and water cannons. Ten protesters were arrested.	
13 October 2023	Grenoble	?	Demonstration in the city center. Ended with police intervention. Some protesters were arrested.	
13 October 2023	Marseille	?	Demonstration in the city center. Ended with police intervention. Some protesters were arrested.	
13 October 2023	Lyon	?	Demonstration in the city center. Ended with police intervention. Some protesters were arrested.	
13 October 2023	Lille	?	Demonstration in the city center. Ended with police intervention. Some protesters were arrested.	
13 October 2023	Strasbourg	?	Demonstration in the city center. Ended with police intervention. Some protesters were arrested.	
14 October 2023	Paris	?	Demonstration in the city center. Ended with police intervention. Some protesters were arrested including French-Algerian journalist Taha Bouhafs while covering the protest.	
19 October 2023	Lannemezan	300	Demonstration and march towards the Lannemezan prison to demand the release of Georges Abdallah.	
22 October 2023	Paris	15,000	Demonstration in the city center. First demonstration authorized by the French government since 7 October.	
28 October 2023	Tours	?	Demonstration and march through the city center.	
28 October 2023	Paris	3,000-4,000	Demonstration in the city center. 1,359 protesters were fined 135€ for "participating in an illegal demonstration".	
2 November 2023	Toulouse	1,000	Demonstration and march through the city center.	
2 November 2023	Paris	2,000	Demonstration in the city center.	
4 November 2023	Nice	?	Demonstration in the city center.	
4 November 2023	Orléans	?	Demonstration in the city center.	
4 November 2023	Rouen	?	Demonstration in the city center.	
4 November 2023	Villefranche-sur-Saône	150	Demonstration in the city center.	
4 November 2023	Bordeaux	300-400	Demonstration in the city center.	
4 November 2023	Nancy	500	Demonstration and march through the city center.	
4 November 2023	Toulouse	600-2,000	Demonstration and march through the city center.	
4 November 2023	Grenoble	2,500	Demonstration and march through the city center.	
4 November 2023	Lyon	6,000	Demonstration in the city center.	
4 November 2023	Strasbourg	1,000	Demonstration in the city center. Protesters chanted slogans such as "So, so, so, solidarité avec les Gazaouis" ("So, so, so, solidarity with the people of Gaza") and "Israël terroriste, Macron complice" ("Israel is a terrorist, Macron is an accomplice").	
4 November 2023	Paris	19,000-60,000	Demonstration and march through the city center.	
9 November 2023	Strasbourg	500	Night vigil at Place Kléber.	
10 November 2023	Tours	250	Demonstration and march through the city center.	
11 November 2023	Ajaccio	?	Demonstration and march through the city center.	
11 November 2023	Nice	?	Demonstration and march through the city center.	
11 November 2023	Rennes	?	Demonstration in the city center.	
11 November 2023	Bordeaux	500	Demonstration in the city center.	
11 November 2023	Montpellier	500	Demonstration in the city center.	
11 November 2023	Marseille	1,300	Demonstration in the city center.	
11 November 2023	Toulouse	2000	Demonstration and march through the city center.	
11 November 2023	Paris	16,200	Demonstration and march through the city center.	
18 November 2023	Paris	?	Demonstration and march through the city center.	
25 November 2023	Carcassonne	50	Torchlight march through the city center.	
2 December 2023	Strasbourg	?	Demonstration and march through the city center.	
2 December 2023	Carcassonne	100	Demonstration in the city center.	
9 December 2023	Strasbourg	?	Demonstration and march through the city center.	
16 December 2023	Strasbourg	?	Demonstration and march through the city center.	
16 December 2023	Toulouse	?	Demonstration and march through the city center.	
16 December 2023	Chambéry	200	Demonstration in the city center.	
17 December 2023	Paris	?	Demonstration and march through the city center.	
17 December 2023	Strasbourg	?	Demonstration outside a shopping center.	

=== 2024 ===
Date	City/town	Estimated attendance	Description	Ref(s)
21 January 2024	Paris	?	Car parade with protesters waving Palestinian flags. Ended with police intervention.	
14 February 2024	Paris	500	Demonstration outside the Ministry for Europe and Foreign Affairs.	
18 February 2024	Marseille	500	Demonstration and march through the city center.	
9 March 2024	Strasbourg	?	Peace march. Protesters covered a distance of 36km, representing the distance between Gaza City and Rafah.	
9 March 2024	Lyon	750	Demonstration in the city center. Protesters unfurled a large banner reading "Levée du siège criminel de Gaza" ("Lift the criminal siege on Gaza").	
9 March 2024	Nantes	900	Demonstration in the city center.	
9 March 2024	Paris	11,500-60,000	Demonstration and march through the city center.	
24 April 2024	Paris	50	Occupation of a Sciences Po building. Ended with police intervention.	
25 April 2024	Paris	150	Occupation of a Sciences Po building. Protesters blocked the entrance with trash, pieces of metal and wood, and a motorcycle. Lasted until 26 April. Ended with police intervention.	
29 April 2024	Paris	50	Encampment at the Sorbonne University. Ended with police intervention.	
30 April 2024	Paris	?	Demonstration at Tolbiac campus.	
30 April 2024	Menton	30	Occupation of a building at the Sciences Po Menton.	
30 April 2024	Strasbourg	50	Demonstration in front of the Institut d'études politiques de Strasbourg.	
30 April 2024	Grenoble	50	Sit-in outside Grenoble Institute of Political Studies. Protesters occupied the tram lines blocking tram traffic.	
30 April 2024	Lyon	200	Demonstration at the courtyard of the Institut d'études politiques de Lyon.	
2 May 2024	Saint-Étienne	15	Occupation of a Sciences Po campus. Lasted until 3 May. Ended with police intervention.	
2 May 2024	Lille	80	Blocking of the École supérieure de journalisme de Lille. Protesters demanded the end of a collaboration between Sciences Po Lille and Tel Aviv University.	
2 May 2024	Lyon	100	Occupation of an amphitheater at Institut d'études politiques de Lyon. Protesters unfurled a large Palestinian flag.	
2 May 2024	Paris	300	Encampment at the Sorbonne University.	
18 May 2024	Grenoble	1,500	Demonstration and march through the city center on occasion of the 76 years of the Nakba.	
18 May 2024	Paris	5,000	Demonstration and march through the city center on occasion of the 76 years of the Nakba.	
27 May 2024	Paris	10,000	Demonstration in the city center in reaction to the Israeli strike that killed at least 45 people in a refugee camp in the southern Gaza Strip the previous day .	
28 May 2024	Paris	5,000	Demonstration at the Place de la République.	
1 June 2024	Paris	22,000	Demonstration and march through the city center. Some protesters also paid tribute to anti-fascist activist Clément Méric.	
5 October 2024	Bordeaux	200	Demonstration and march through the city center. Protesters held a minute of silence in homage of the murdered Palestinians.	
5 October 2024	Strasbourg	200	Demonstration and march through the city center.	
5 October 2024	Toulouse	300	Demonstration and march through the city center. Protesters chanted the name of imprisoned Lebanese pro-Palestinian activist Georges Ibrahim Abdallah.	
5 October 2024	Lyon	300	Demonstration and march through the city center.	
5 October 2024	Nantes	350	Demonstration and march through the city center.	
5 October 2024	Paris	5,000	Demonstration and march through the city center. Protesters demanded the government to recognize the state of Palestine.	
9 November 2024	Paris	500	Demonstration and march through the city center.	
13 November 2024	Paris	3,000	Demonstration outside a far-right pro-Israel gala that Israeli Finance Minister Bezalel Smotrich was scheduled to attend.	
14 November 2024	Paris	500	Demonstration before a UEFA match featuring visiting Israeli team Maccabi Tel Aviv F.C., less than one week after riots during and after their last game in Amsterdam caused an international incident. Scuffles and altercations between pro-Palestine and pro-Israel supporters occurred after the match. Some protesters defaced a McDonald's restaurant and a Starbucks. Ended with police intervention, including the use of tear gas.	
7 December 2024	Paris	?	Demonstration and march through the city center. A counter-protester tore down a sign from demonstrators and brandished a firearm. The individual was arrested.	

=== 2025 ===
Date	City/town	Estimated attendance	Description	Ref(s)
25 January 2025	Paris	5,000	Demonstration and march through the city center.	
30 March 2025	Paris	500	Demonstration and march on the occasion of the Land Day.	
10 April 2025	Crolles	?	Demonstration outside a factory of STMicroelectronics against its collaboration with Israeli defence companies.	
1 May 2025	Colomiers	?	Demonstration at a roundabout.	
1 May 2025	Muret	?	Demonstration at a roundabout.	
1 May 2025	Tournefeuille	?	Demonstration at a roundabout.	
25 May 2025	Paris	4,000	Demonstration at the Place de la République.	
1 June 2025	Lille	1,000	Demonstration and march through the city center.	
9 June 2025	Montargis	?	Demonstration as part of a demonstration against far-right groups.	
10 June 2025	Paris	8,000–50,000	Demonstration in the city center, demanding the release of activists on the Madleen detained by Israel.	
14 June 2025	Lille	?	Demonstration in the city center.	
14 June 2025	Lyon	?	Demonstration in the city center.	
14 June 2025	Marseille	?	Demonstration in the city center.	
14 June 2025	Rennes	?	Demonstration in the city center.	
14 June 2025	Romans-sur-Isère	670	Demonstration in the city center.	
14 June 2025	Grenoble	1500	Demonstration and march through the city center.	
14 June 2025	Toulouse	1,300-3,000	Demonstration and march through the city center.	
14 June 2025	Paris	9,000-150,000	Demonstration and march through the city center.	
20 June 2025	Massy	300	Demonstration in the city center.	
26 July 2025	Paris	?	Demonstration at the La Madeleine church.	
2 August 2025	Strasbourg	?	Demonstration at Place Broglie.	
6 August 2025	Strasbourg	?	Demonstration and march through the city center.	
16 August 2025	Strasbourg	?	Human chain from Place Kléber to Pont de l'Europe.	
4 September 2025	Nice	3	Attempted breaking into a synagogue where a meeting on aliyah - immigration of Jews to Israel - was taking place. Ended with police intervention. Three activists were arrested.	
3 October 2025	Cherbourg-en-Cotentin	130	Demonstration to protest against Israel's seizure of the Global Sumud Flotilla in the Place de Gaulle.	
4 October 2025	Paris	5,000–10,000	Demonstration in the city center.	
17 October 2025	Tournefeuille	50	Demonstration at a roundabout.	
6 November 2025	Paris	?	Disruption of a concert by the Israel Philharmonic Orchestra, conducted by Lahav Shani. Protesters stormed the stage and set-off a few smoke bombs.	
8 November 2025	Orléans	?	Demonstration in the city center.	
30 November 2025	Paris	50,000	Demonstration to mark the International Day of Solidarity with the Palestinian People.	

=== 2026 ===
Date	City/town	Estimated attendance	Description	Ref(s)
7 February 2026	Paris	500	Demonstration in the city center in solidarity with Palestine, Haiti, Venezuela, New Caledonia, the Democratic Republic of Congo and Sudan.	
22 February 2026	Concarneau	80	Demonstration in front of the market hall in Concarneau.	
28 March 2026	Angers	1,000	Demonstration in the city center.	
28 March 2026	Paris	5,000	Demonstration in the city center.	
28 March 2026	Lyon	1,200	Demonstration in the city center.	
12 April 2026	Paris	100+	Demonstration against the Yadan bill proposed by Caroline Yadan.	
14 April 2026	Paris	?	Sit in at Sorbonne University in protest of the proposed death penalty law for Palestinians. Ended with police intervention.	
14 April 2026	Paris	?	Sit in at Paris-Saclay University in protest of the proposed death penalty law for Palestinians. Ended with police intervention.	
14 April 2026	Paris	?	Sit in at Science Po University in protest of the proposed death penalty law for Palestinians. Ended with police intervention.	
5 May 2026	Paris	?	Demonstration in the city center in protest of the latest Israeli attack on Global Sumud Flotilla.	
9 May 2026	Brest	60	Demonstration in the city center.	

== See also ==
- Gaza war protests
- Boycott, Divestment, and Sanctions
- Lists of pro-Palestinian protests
