= Paris's 19th constituency =

Paris's 19th constituency may refer to:

- Paris's 19th constituency (1958–1986)
- Paris's 19th constituency (1988–2012)
