= Paris's 17th constituency =

Constituency of the National Assembly of France

17th constituency of Paris
- inline Constituency of the National Assembly of France

- Paris, showing its post 2012 legislative constituencies
- Deputy: Danièle Obono; LFI
- Department: Paris
- Registered voters: 58,245

The 17th constituency of Paris (French: Dix-septième circonscription de Paris) is a French legislative constituency in the Paris département (75). Like the other 576 French constituencies, it elects one MP using the two-round system. The constituency, created by the 2010 redistricting of French legislative constituencies, consists of part of the 18th arrondissement, comprising the districts of Goutte-d'Or and La Chapelle, and part of the 19th arrondissement, comprising the district of La Villette and a small part of the district of Combat located at west of avenue Secrétan, avenue Simon-Bolivar and rue Henri-Turot, which is almost exactly the area covered by the 1988–2007 19th constituency.

The 1988–2007 version of the constituency was created by the 1986 redistricting of French legislative constituencies. Since 2010, its areas are mostly covered by Paris's 3rd constituency.

Before 1986, the 17th constituency referred to a constituency in the South-West of the city.

17th constituency of Paris
- inline Constituency of the National Assembly of France

- Paris, showing its legislative constituencies between 1988 and 2012
- Member: constituency abolished, 2012
- Department: Paris

Map of Paris constituencies in 1981.

== Historic representation ==
Election	Member	Party	Source
1958	Jean Baylot	CNIP	
1962	Jacques Marette	UNR	
1963	Bernard Rocher	UNR	
1967	Jacques Marette	UDR	
1968	Jacques Marette	UDR	
1973	Jacques Marette	UDR	
1978	Jacques Marette	RPR	
1981	Jacques Marette	RPR	
1984	Bernard Rocher	RPR	
1986	Proportional representation - no election by constituency		
1988	Françoise de Panafieu	RPR	
1993	Françoise de Panafieu	RPR	
1997	Annick Lepetit	PS	
2002	Annick Lepetit	PS	
2007	Annick Lepetit	PS	
2012	Daniel Vaillant	PS	
2017	Danièle Obono	LFI	
2022	Danièle Obono	LFI	
2024	Danièle Obono	LFI	

== Election results ==
=== 2024 ===
Candidate	Party	Alliance	First round			Second round		
Candidate	Party	Alliance	Votes	%	+/–	Votes	%	+/–
Danièle Obono	LFI	NFP	26,238	64.23	+7.16			
Kolia Bénié	RE	ENS	7,012	17.16	-2.75			
Anne de la Brélie	RN		3,666	8.97	+4.59			
Angélique Michel	LR		1,619	3.96	+0.04			
Mathias Saint-Ellier	UDI		744	1.82	N/A			
Michel Bouchou	DVE		578	1.41	N/A			
Brigitte Rumeau	REC		414	1.01	-2.79			
Abdellah Aksas	LO		399	0.98	+0.04			
Victor Fournier	DVC		181	0.44	N/A			
Marie-Agnés Vallee	DLF		0	0.00	N/A			
Clément Rousseau	EXG		0	0.00	N/A			
Valid votes			40,851	98.20	-0.03			
Blank votes			466	1.12	-0.10			
Null votes			281	0.68	+0.13			
Turnout			41,598	65.88	+19.47			
Abstentions			21,540	34.12	-19.47			
Registered voters			63,138					
Source: Ministry of the Interior, Le Monde
Result						LFI HOLD		

=== 2022 ===
Legislative Election 2022: Paris's 17th constituency
Party	Candidate	Votes	%	±%
LFI (NUPÉS)	Danièle Obono	16,161	57.07	+14.38
LREM (Ensemble)	Kolia Bénié	5,638	19.91	−11.08
RN	Marianna Técher	1,241	4.38	−0.37
LR (UDC)	Angélique Michel	1,111	3.92	−2.61
REC	Marie Falicon	1,076	3.80	N/A
DVE	Mams Yaffa	1,010	3.57	N/A
Others	N/A	2,082		
Turnout		28,319	46.41	+0.26
LFI hold				

=== 2017 ===
Legislative Election 2017: Paris's 17th constituency
Party	Candidate	Votes	%	±%
LREM	Béatrice Faillés	8,172	30.99	N/A
LFI	Danièle Obono	4,481	17.00	N/A
PCF	Ian Brossat	2,730	10.35	−2.84
PS	Colombe Brossel	2,375	9.01	−37.10
DVG	Daniel Vaillant	1,740	6.60	N/A
LR	Babette De Rozieres	1,722	6.53	−11.76
EELV	Douchka Markovic	1,670	6.33	−2.00
FN	Vanessa Lancelot	1,252	4.75	−1.25
Others	N/A	2,224		
Turnout		26,878	46.15	−5.74
2nd round result
LFI	Danièle Obono	11,360	50.71	N/A
LREM	Béatrice Faillés	11,041	49.29	N/A
Turnout		23,886	41.01	−6.75
LFI gain from PS		Swing		

=== 2012 ===
Legislative Election 2012: Paris's 17th constituency
Party	Candidate	Votes	%	±%
PS	Daniel Vaillant	13,174	46.11	+11.00
UMP	Roxane Decorte	5,225	18.29	−18.19
FG	Ian Brossat	3,769	13.19	N/A
EELV	Barbara Feledziak	2,379	8.33	+4.02
FN	Vanessa Lancelot	1,714	6.00	+2.30
Others	N/A	2,309		
Turnout		28,570	51.89	−8.54
2nd round result
PS	Daniel Vaillant	19,153	72.84	+16.60
UMP	Roxane Decorte	7,140	27.16	−16.60
Turnout		26,293	47.76	−9.88
PS hold				

=== 2007 ===
Elections between 1988 and 2007 were based on the 1988 boundaries. The 17th constituency covered areas moved to the post 2010 3rd constituency.

Map of Paris Constituencies, 1988-2007 elections

Legislative Election 2007: Paris's 17th constituency
Party	Candidate	Votes	%	±%
UMP	Brigitte Kuster	12,304	36.48	
PS	Annick Lepetit	11,841	35.11	
MoDem	Christelle De Cremiers	4,008	11.88	
LV	Marie-Anne Robert-Kerbrat	1,455	4.31	
FN	Martial Bild	1,249	3.70	
Far left	Mélanie Mermoz	937	2.78	
DVG	Jean-Luc Gonneau	695	2.06	
Others	N/A	1,241		
Turnout		34,102	60.43	
2nd round result
PS	Annick Lepetit	17,944	56.24	
UMP	Brigitte Kuster	13,963	43.76	
Turnout		32,524	57.64	
PS hold				

=== 2002 ===
Legislative Election 2002: Paris's 17th constituency
Party	Candidate	Votes	%	±%
PS	Annick Lepetit	10,664	33.42	
UMP	Patrick Stefanini	10,357	32.46	
FN	Jean-Pierre Reveau	2,842	8.91	
UDF	Christelle Augier de Cremiers	2,423	7.59	
LV	Xavier Knowles	1,660	5.20	
DVD	Jérôme Levron	824	2.58	
PCF	Michel Rizzi	668	2.09	
Others	N/A	2,469		
Turnout		32,320	66.92	
2nd round result
PS	Annick Lepetit	14,712	50.27	
UMP	Patrick Stefanini	14,556	49.73	
Turnout		30,108	62.35	
PS gain from UMP				

=== 1997 ===
Legislative Election 1997: Paris's 17th constituency
Party	Candidate	Votes	%	±%
RPR	Françoise de Panafieu	10,217	34.38	
PS	Annick Lepetit	7,380	24.83	
FN	Jean-Pierre Reveau	4,153	13.97	
PCF	Michel Rizzi	1,816	6.11	
LV	Xavier Knowles	1,061	3.57	
LO	Jean-Louis Nuel	919	3.09	
DVD	Thierry Bergeras	867	2.92	
Others	N/A	3,308		
Turnout		30,691	60.97	
2nd round result
RPR	Françoise de Panafieu	16,247	52.55	
PS	Annick Lepetit	14,670	47.45	
Turnout		32,399	64.36	
RPR hold				
