= Stanislas Guerini =

French politician (born 1982)

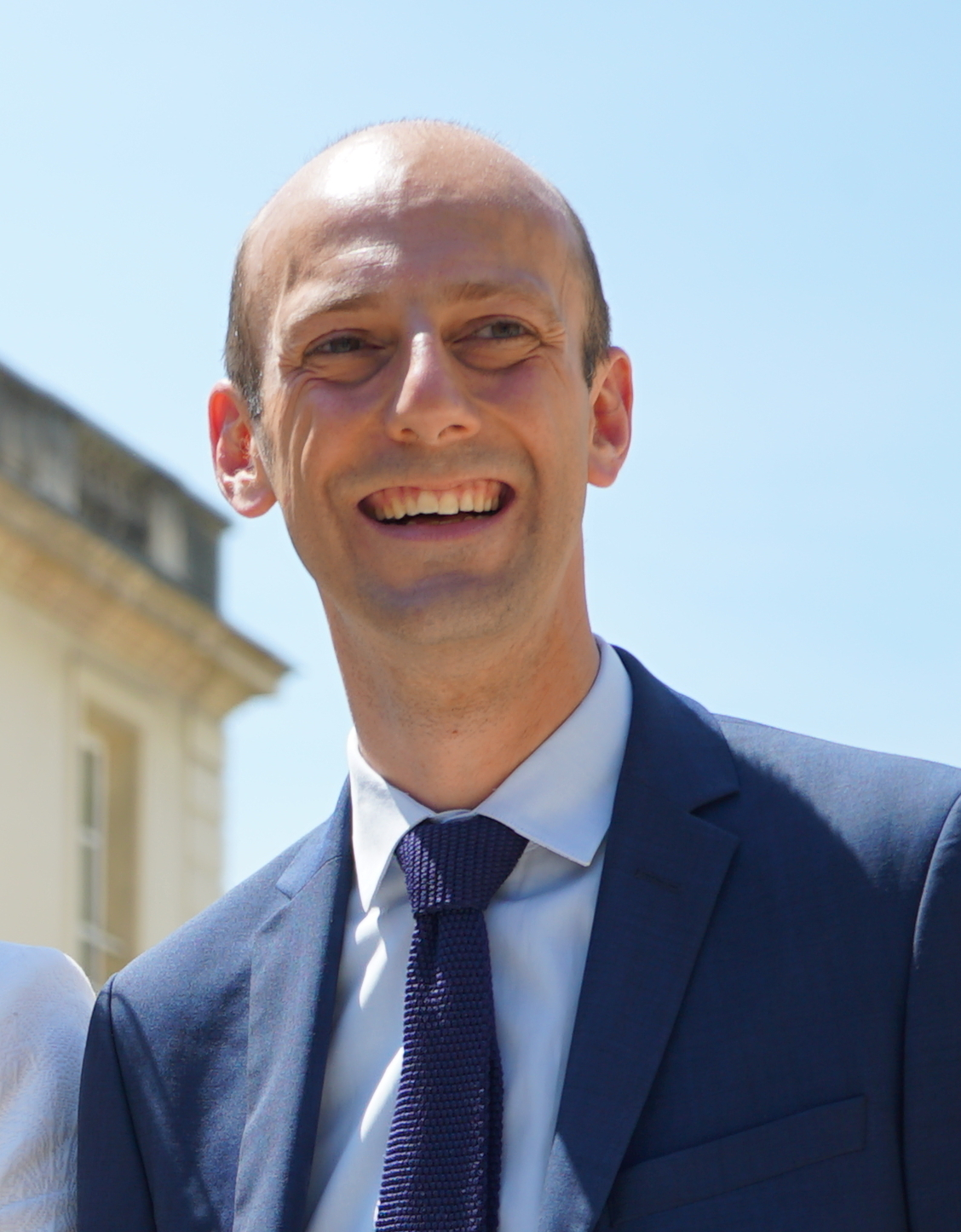
- Guerini in 2017

Minister of Public Transformation and Service
- In office 20 May 2022 – 21 September 2024
- Prime Minister: Élisabeth Borne; Gabriel Attal
- Preceded by: Amélie de Montchalin
- Succeeded by: Guillaume Kasbarian

Executive Officer of La République En Marche!
- In office 1 December 2018 – 17 September 2022
- Preceded by: Christophe Castaner
- Succeeded by: Stéphane Séjourné (as General Secretary)

Member of the National Assembly for Paris's 3rd constituency
- In office 21 June 2017 – 22 July 2022
- Preceded by: Annick Lepetit
- Succeeded by: Caroline Yadan

Personal details
- Born: Stanislas Daniel Guerini; 14 May 1982 (age 43) Paris, France
- Party: Renaissance
- Education: École alsacienne Lycée Henri-IV
- Alma mater: HEC Paris

Stanislas Daniel Guerini (French pronunciation: [stanislas ɡeʁini]; born 14 May 1982) is a French politician who served as Minister of Public Transformation and Service in the governments of Prime Ministers Élisabeth Borne and Gabriel Attal from 2022 to 2024.

Prior to entering government, Guerini served as Executive Officer of La République En Marche! (LREM, renamed Renaissance in 2022) from 2018. He succeeded Christophe Castaner, who had resigned after he was appointed Minister of the Interior. From 2017 to 2022, Guerini was the member of the National Assembly for the 3rd constituency of Paris, which covers parts of its 17th and 18th arrondissements.

== Early life and education ==
One of his grandfathers, an Italian immigrant, fled the Fascist regime to settle in France.

After graduating from HEC Paris in 2006, Guerini established his company Watt & Home, selling and installing solar panels, founded in 2007. At the end of 2013, he left his position of general manager of Watt and Home and became director of customer experience of the multinational Elis, a company in the field of cleaning and hygiene (industrial laundry).

== Political career ==
=== Socialist Party ===
Guerini was associated with Dominique Strauss-Kahn's campaign team for the Socialist Party 2006 presidential primary.

=== In the National Assembly ===
Guerini was elected for La République En Marche! in the 2017 legislative election in the 3rd constituency of Paris. He won 45.08% of the first-round vote, then won in the second round against the Union of Democrats and Independents candidate Valérie Nahmias with 65.5%. Outgoing deputy Annick Lepetit of the Socialist Party placed third in the first round.

In the National Assembly, from 29 June 2017 to 17 January 2019, Guerini served on the Finance, General Economy and Budgetary Monitoring Committee. He then became a member of the Committee on National Defence and the Armed Forces. In addition to his committee assignments, he was also part of one of the expert group commissioned by Finance Minister Bruno Le Maire to lead the preparatory work for the Action Plan for Business Growth and Transformation.

In 2019, Guerini's office was vandalised during anti-government protests of the Yellow vests movement.

He won reelection in 2022 for Ensemble although placing second in the first round, winning 51% of the second-round vote. Following his appointment to the government, he was replaced by his substitute Caroline Yadan in the National Assembly.

=== LREM Executive Officer ===
In October 2018, Guerini announced his candidacy to succeed Christophe Castaner as Executive Officer (délégué général) of La République En Marche! On 1 December 2018, he was elected to the position with 82% of the vote against fellow deputy Joachim Son-Forget.

=== Minister of Public Transformation and Service ===
In 2022, Guerini was appointed Minister of Public Transformation and Service in the Borne government. He retained the office in the Attal government, but left the position following him losing his reelection bid in Parliament against Léa Balage El Mariky of The Ecologists (part of the New Popular Front) in the 2024 legislative election – she placed first in 2022, but was then defeated in the second round.

== Political positions ==
In July 2019, Guerini voted in favour of the French ratification of the European Union's Comprehensive Economic and Trade Agreement (CETA) with Canada.

When National Rally MEP Jordan Bardella tweeted criticism of Muslim LREM candidate Sara Zemmahi for wearing a hijab in a campaign poster, Guerini responded in agreement and Zammahi was barred from running as a LREM candidate. Guerini claimed that "wearing ostentatious religious symbols on a campaign document is not compatible with the values of LREM", echoing France's longstanding laicism policy. This was condemned by fellow LREM deputies Coralie Dubost and Caroline Janvier.

== Honours ==
- Knight of the Legion of Honour (2025)
