= Martin Edzodzomo-Ela =

Gabonese economist and politician

Martin Edzodzomo-Ela, also rendered as Martin Edzodzomo Ela or Martin Edzodzomo Ella, is a Gabonese economist and politician. He has written a number of books and articles advocating for democratic reforms in Gabon. His work with the Gabonese opposition caused his dismissal as a prominent banking executive in the 1970s. He ran as an independent protest candidate in the 1998 Gabonese presidential election.

== Life and career ==
Edzodzomo-Ela holds a PhD in economics. He worked as a senior executive at the Paribas-Gabon bank from 1975 to 1979, but he was dismissed for his opposition to the regime of Omar Bongo. Ever since his political activity in the 1970s, he has been a prominent member of the pro-democratic Gabonese opposition.

Edzodzomo-Ela ran as an independent candidate in the Gabonese presidential election of 1998, where he finished with 1,548 votes, or 0.49% of the votes cast.

Edzodzomo-Ela has written a series of books about the political, social, and economic situation of Gabon, including a book-length treatment of Gabonese democracy in the early 1990s and a political manifesto regarding the future of Gabon. He has also contributed journalistic and opinion articles to French African publications like the Libreville news and Cameroun Web, and he has been interviewed or quoted in outlets like the Courier des Afriques and Gabon Review. Much of his political commentary has revolved around the ramifications of the systems established by Omar Bongo, which Edzodzomo-Ela argues have been inconsistent with democracies and fair elections. He has advocated fundamental overhauls to these institutions, including constitutional reform.

Edzodzomo-Ela's daughter, Danièle Obono, was born in Libreville, and in 2017 was elected to the National Assembly of France representing Paris's 17th constituency for La France Insoumise.

== Selected works ==
- De la démocratie au Gabon : Les fondements d'un renouveau national (1993)
- Une parole pour un Etat républicain, démocratique et social en Afrique noire, in three volumes
- Mon projet pour le Gabon : comment redresser un pays ruiné par trois décennies de mauvaise gestion (2015)
