= Danièle Obono =

French politician (born 1980)

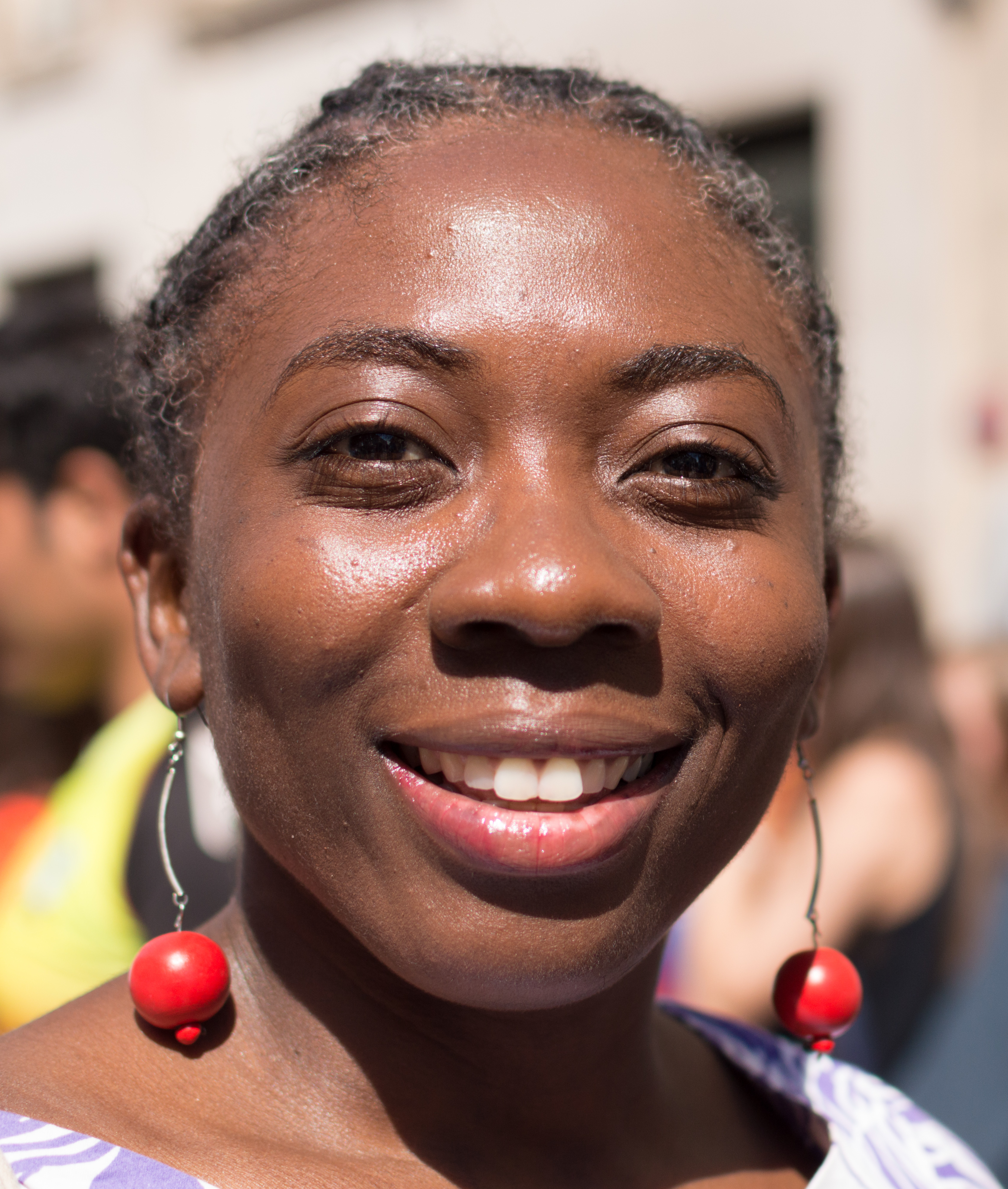
- Portrait of Obono at Paris Pride, 2017

Member of the National Assembly for Paris's 17th constituency
- Incumbent
- Assumed office 21 June 2017
- Preceded by: Daniel Vaillant

Personal details
- Born: 12 July 1980 (age 46) Libreville, Estuaire, Gabon
- Party: La France Insoumise
- Other political affiliations: Front de Gauche
- Parent: Martin Edzodzomo-Ela (father)
- Education: Panthéon-Sorbonne University

Danièle Obono (French pronunciation: [danjɛl ɔbɔno]; born 12 July 1980) is a left-wing Gabonese-French politician who has represented Paris's 17th constituency in the National Assembly since 2017. A member of La France Insoumise (FI), she was reelected in the first round of the 2022 legislative election and again in the 2024 legislative election.

== Biography ==
=== Early life and education ===
Obono was born on 12 July 1980 in Libreville, Gabon to a prominent Gabonese family. She is the daughter of Hortense Simbou Mbadinga, a secretary at Air Gabon; and Martin Edzodzomo-Ela, an economist who was a senior executive at the Paribas-Gabon bank from 1975 to 1979 before he was dismissed for his opposition to the regime of Omar Bongo, who was also a candidate in the Gabonese presidential election of 1998. Obono lived in Gabon until she was about ten years old, before she moved to France to attend university in Montpellier. She became a naturalised French citizen in 2011.

After graduating from university, Obono became a librarian in Paris. In 2002, she obtained a master's degree in history at Paris 1 Panthéon-Sorbonne University, studying the economic relationship between France and Gabon during the second half of the 20th century under the supervision of Jacques Marseille. In 2003, she started a doctoral programme in political science at the Institut des mondes africains, focusing on social and democratic movements in Nigeria, though she began her political career before completing that degree.

=== Start in politics ===
At the age of 20, Obono, a supporter of José Bové, participated in the dismantling of the partially built McDonald's restaurant in Millau. There, she met Attac activists and joined the Trotskyist movement "Socialism from Below"(SPEB). A few years later, SPEB merged with the Revolutionary Communist League, which was later reformed into the New Anticapitalist Party (NPA) in 2009. She became a member of the NPA's leadership, where she advocated for the Convergences and Alternative (C&A) current.

Expressing a desire to participate in the Left Front, C&A became an independent organization in 2011. Obono took part in the national council of Jean-Luc Mélenchon's campaign for the 2012 presidential election.

In the legislative elections of the same year, Obono was the substitute candidate for Ian Brossat (PCF), under the Left Front label, in Paris' 17th constituency. With 13.19% of the votes cast, they came in 3rd place.

Two years later, in the 2nd arrondissement of Paris, Obono led the "Left Front - In Paris, People First!" list, which garnered 192 votes (2.8%) in the 2014 municipal elections. In 2014, C&A− merged with other left-wing parties to form Ensemble!. Obono left the party between 2017 and 2022.

=== 2017 French presidential elections ===
Obono became a member of La France insoumise (LFI). During the 2017 French presidential election campaign, she was one of the spokespersons for candidate Jean-Luc Mélenchon, and spokesperson ("national speaker") for LFI. She coordinated, with the agro-economist Laurent Levard, the collective "Livrets de La France insoumise," a programmatic complement to L’Avenir en commun, one of the issues of which she co-wrote with the philosopher Benoît Schneckenburger, entitled Against Racism and discrimination: Bringing equality to life.

Obono was elected deputy for Paris's 17th constituency during the 2017 French legislative elections, receiving 50.71% of the votes, or 319 votes ahead, in the second round, against Béatrice Faillès, candidate for La République en Marche (Renaissance).

=== 2022 elections ===
During the 2022 French legislative election campaign, Obono was criticized for appearing with Danielle Simonnet in the company of British MP Jeremy Corbyn and accused of complacency with antisemitism.

Obono was re-elected in the first round under the New Ecological and Social People's Union (NUPES) with 16,161 votes, or 57.07% of the votes cast. Following a vote during the session of 26 July 2022 at the French National Assembly, Obono was elected a judge of the Cour de Justice de la République. She was officially sworn in the next day.

=== 2024 elections ===
Obono won unopposed in the first round of the snap legislative election on 30 June 2024.

=== Position taking ===
While Secretary of the National Assembly's European Affairs Committee, Danièle Obono was ranked as the 6th most active MP by the business magazine Capital after six months in office.

Shortly after her election, Danièle Obono declared herself to be an alterglobalist, afrofeminist (Black feminism), anti-imperialist, anti-racist, anti-liberal, anti-Islamophobe and pan-Africanist. She also humorously defines herself as a "Bolsho-Trotsko-Marxist", from Trotskyism and Marxism ("I have fun claiming these 'isms' when we're told there's no such thing as ideology anymore."), and adds that although "Leninism was [her] gateway [...], anarchists are [her] allies.

=== Parliamentary activity ===
Secretary of the Delegation for Overseas France and vice-chair of the study group on discrimination and LGBTQI-phobia in the world, Obono chairs the France-Bangladesh friendship group.

Opposed to the 2018 Asylum and Immigration Act, Obono considers it to be "useless, counterproductive and dangerous", as it "separates good migrants from bad ones, exiles to be kept from exiles to be expelled ". On the other hand, the government and Interior Minister Gérard Collomb defended the bill in the name of "stepping up the fight against illegal immigration".

In a written question to the government in December 2018, Obono gave her support to Biram Dah Abeid, "an anti-slavery figure in Mauritania". On 3 December 2019, as a member of the Law Commission, she tabled a bill on "stabilising and securing funding and jobs within associations", which aims to define the subsidy as a "funding contract standard" and to extend the powers of the Haut Conseil à la vie associative (High Council for Associative Life) in response to the decline in the number of employees in the associative sector.

In September 2020, she co-signed a bill from the Ecology Democracy Solidarity parliamentary group aimed at strengthening the right to abortion.

As part of the France insoumise parliamentary group in 2021, Obono defended a proposal for a job guarantee, which should enable any unemployed person who wants to work to have a job paying the basic public sector wage or more. According to the MEP, this system should make it possible to link an "ecological bifurcation" with "social progress". However, the proposal has been the subject of debate, with Fabien Roussel, national secretary of the PCF, describing it as a "Soviet-era" philosophy. The economist Henrik Sterdyniak felt that the measure "could not meet the actual needs of households" with jobs of "mediocre quality. In June 2021, she lent her support to the local residents of the Jardin d’Eole, who organised a demonstration every Wednesday to denounce the situation in the neighbourhood because of the insecurity created by the presence of drug addicts.

However, her support for the mobilisations was criticised by the Parisian right, who accused her of political recuperation. In a press release, Danièle Obono called for "a global strategy and large-scale resources.

At the session of the National Assembly on 26 July 2022, she was elected a full judge of the Court de Justice de la République. She was sworn in on 27 July 2022.

== Controversies ==
=== About freedom of expression ===
==== Pétition of Les Inrockuptibles for artists ====
On 21 June 2017, Obono was invited onto the TV Show Les Grandes Gueules, in which Alain Marschall blamed her for a petition signed in 2012 and launched by the cultural magazine Les Inrockuptibles in support of artists' freedom of expression. The petition denounced the indictment of Saïdou, lead singer of the group Zone d'expression populaire (transl. area of people’s speech), and sociologist Saïd Bouamama following a complaint from the far-right association AGRIF, which criticized the use of the expression "Nique la France" in a 2010 song.

Obono explained why she had signed up five years earlier: "To defend the freedom of expression of these artists, yes. Because that's one of the fundamental freedoms."

Political scientist Laurent Bouvet and Valeurs actuelles portrayed her as being close to another signatory, Houria Bouteldja, a member of the Indigènes de la République, which she disputes. After comments from the far right on her response, a petition against her gathered 5,000 signatures in what Les Inrockuptibles described as a "polemic with racist overtones". LFI MP Éric Coquerel expressed surprise that the question had been put specifically to her, because of her skin colour, and not to others who had signed the petition five years earlier, such as Clémentine Autain, Noël Mamère and Eva Joly, but also artists Rachid Taha, Zebda and Siné, trade unionists Élie Domota and Xavier Mathieu and journalist Rokhaya Diallo. On 11 December 2018, the French Supreme Court definitively dismissed all AGRIF's claims against the song.

==== Debate with Manuel Valls ====
In October 2017, a controversy over freedom of expression pitted Obono against Manuel Valls, faced with the appeal of Farida Amrani, LFI candidate narrowly beaten in the legislative elections in the constituency including Évry, a city where Dieudonné had obtained 3.84% in the first round of the 2017 French legislative election.

On Europe 1, Valls attributed the following comments to Obono: "the text she wrote after the attacks of January 2015 (...) when she says that she rather cried for Dieudonné and not for Charlie's victims". The journalist Patrick Cohen then pointed out to him that this text is more of a lament, in his view, about the censorship that struck Dieudonné at the end of 2013 than about Dieudonné himself.

On 5 November, Obono responded to this controversy on Radio J. She criticized Dieudonné because he was "racist and anti-Semitic". Her statement was taken up by AFP, immediately recalling that she had been "accused of Islamo-leftist drift by Manuel Valls" and observing that she refers "to the numerous press releases from the Human Rights League" for whom the ban on Dieudonné's shows constitutes "a serious setback to the rule of law, which allows this person to present himself as a victim".

== Political career ==
Following the 2015 Charlie Hebdo attack, Obono was at the centre of a controversy after she stated she would "not cry", deeming the weekly newspaper's cartoons "racist".

A member of LFI, Obono was elected to the National Assembly for Paris's 17th constituency in the legislative election of 2017. She was a spokesperson for La France Insoumise under the leadership of Jean-Luc Mélenchon, together with Alexis Corbière.

In the legislature, Obono has served on the Committee on Legal Affairs, the Committee on European Affairs, and the Committee on Foreign Affairs.

In November 2017, she was involved in another controversy after she defended union meetings in Seine-Saint-Denis that were closed to white people. After the government announced it would sue the organizers, Obono had an altercation with Mélenchon in the National Assembly, following his support of the government on this matter.

In August 2020, the right-wing French magazine Valeurs actuelles published a seven-page fantasy story with illustrations of Obono as a slave in chains facing the sunset, shackled beside a fire, under the title "summer fantasy story", prompting an outcry from politicians of various parties.
