= Paris's 19th constituency (1988–2012) =

French Fifth Republic Constituency

19th constituency of Paris
- inline Constituency of the National Assembly of France

- Paris, showing its legislative constituencies between 1988 and 2012
- Member: constituency abolished, 2012
- Department: Paris

Paris's 19th constituency was one of the 21 French National Assembly constituencies in the Paris department in the period 1988 to 2012. It was abolished in the 2010 redistricting of French legislative constituencies, which reduced the number of constituencies in Paris to 18. The territory of the 19th constituency, in the north of Paris, corresponds almost exactly with the post-2012 17th constituency.

== Description ==
After the 1986 French legislative election, the new prime minister Jacques Chirac re-established the two-round single-member district electoral system. The number of deputies from Paris was maintained at 21 and the previous (pre-1986) electoral constituencies were therefore reduced from 31 to 21. The whole of the former 27th, part of the former 28th and part of the former 29th constituencies formed the new nineteenth constituency. From the 1988 election to the 2010 redistricting, the constituency covered two districts of the 18th arrondissement (Goutte-d'Or and La Chapelle) and one district of the 19th arrondissement (La Villette).

In 1999, the Institut national de la statistique et des études économiques estimated the population of the constituency as 106,141 inhabitants.

== Historic Representation ==
Election	Member	Party	Notes
1988	Daniel Vaillant	PS	
1993	Jean-Pierre Pierre-Bloch	UDF (PSD)	Election was annulled by the Constitutional Council, then a by-election was held
1994	Daniel Vaillant	PS	elected at by-election
1997	Daniel Vaillant	PS	Nominated to the government, replaced by his substitute, Daniel Marcovitch
1997	Daniel Marcovitch	PS	
2002	Daniel Vaillant	PS	
2007	Daniel Vaillant	PS	constituency abolished - Vaillant continued as the deputy for the 17th constituency, which covers almost exactly the same territory

== Election results ==
=== 1988 ===
1988 French legislative election results in Paris's 19th constituency
Candidate	Party		1st round		2nd round	
Candidate	Party		Votes	%	Votes	%
Daniel Vaillant	Socialist Party	PS	8,070	32.25	14,634	54.72
Jean-Pierre Pierre-Bloch	UDF (Social Democratic Party)	UDF (PSD)	8,061	32.21	12,108	45.27
Patrice de Blignières	National Front	FN	3,371	13.47		
Louis Baillot	Communist Party	PCF	2,251	8.99		
Manuel Escutia	Socialist Party dissident	diss. PS	1,889	7.54		
Louis Girard	Extreme Right	EXD	1,028	4.10		
Sauveur Boukris	Miscellaneous right	DVD	228	0.91		
Anne-Marie Desachy	POE	87	0.34			
Pascal Jouvin	Miscellaneous right	DVD	37	0.14		
Registered Voters			45,595	100.00	45,595	100.00
Abstentions			20,229	44.37	18,106	39.71
Votes			25,366	55.63	27,489	60.29
Blank or Void ballots			344	1.36	747	2.72
Total Votes			25,022	98.64	26,742	97.28
Source : Le Monde, 7 and 14 June 1988

=== 1993 ===
1993 French legislative election results in Paris's 19th constituency
		First round		Second round	
Registered Voters		41,825		41,825	
Abstentions		16,015	38.29 %	16,448	39.33 %
Votes		25,810	61.71 %	25,377	60.67 %
Votes		25,810		25,377	
Blank or Void ballots		854	3.31 %	1,822	7.18 %
Valid Votes		24,956	96.69 %	23,555	92.82 %
Candidate	Party	Votes	%	Votes	%
Jean-Pierre Pierre-Bloch	Union for French Democracy (UDF)	8,703	34.87 %	12,262	52.06 %
Daniel Vaillant	Socialist Party (PS)	5,483	21.97 %	11,293	47.94 %
Patrice De Blignieres	National Rally (FN)	3,604	14.44 %		
Philippe Germa	Ecology Generation (GE)	2,317	9.28 %		
Mireille Marchioni	Communist (PCF)	1,794	7.19 %		
Louis Girard	IFF (Note: Trop d'immigrés, la France aux Français)	888	3.56 %		
Annie Souchon	LO	618	2.48 %		
Andre Malvoisin	Le Trèfle - Les nouveaux écologistes (NERNA)	576	2.31 %		
Philippe Cretet	EXG	282	1.13 %		
Bruno Sourcis	Union Ecologie et Démocratie (UED)	233	0.93 %		
Jean-Claude Patout	Independent	195	0.78 %		
Louis Andre	Majorité Présidentielle	136	0.54 %		
Alain-Serge Clary	Mouvement des réformateurs (MDR)	127	0.51 %		

Table Notes 1993:

=== 1994 by-election ===
Jean-Pierre Pierre-Bloch's election in 1993 was annulled by the Constitutional Council, and a by-election held on 30 January and 8 February 1994.

Results of 1994 by-election, Paris's 19th constituency
Candidate	Party	First round		Second round	
Candidate	Party	Votes	%	Votes	%
Daniel Vaillant	PS	4,191	33.20	7,964	53.60
Anne-Marie Pierre-Bloch	UDF (PSD)	3,968	31.43	6,893	46.39
Patrice de Blignières	FN	1,840	14.57		
Mireille Marchioni	PCF	943	7.47		
Louis Girard	Far Right	475	3.76		
Bernadette Léonard-Deligny	The Greens	264	2.09		
Dominique Martin-Ferrari	Ecology Generation	256	2.02		
Arnauld Folch	Far Right	221	1.75		
Philippe Crétet	LCR	181	1.43		
Adnam Alnojem Azzam		125	0.99		
Pierre Abadie		72	0.57		
Alain-Serge Clary	MDR	49	0.38		
José-Philippe Marquis	Miscellaneous Left	36	0.28		
Registered Voters		41,621	100.00	41,621	100.00
Abstentions		28,773	69.13	26,031	62.54
Votes		12,848	30.87	15,590	37.46
Blank or Void ballots		227	1.77	733	4.7
Valid Votes		12 621	98.23	14,857	95.3
Source : Le Monde, 8 February 1994, p. 12

=== 1997 ===
Results of 1997 by-election, Paris's 19th constituency
		First round		Second round	
		Votes	%	Votes	%
Registered Voters		40,955		40,954	
Abstentions		15,868	38.74 %	13,976	34.13 %
Votes		25,087	61.26 %	26,978	65.87 %
Total Votes		25,087		26,978	
Blank or void votes		783	3.12 %	1,405	5.21 %
Valid Votes		24,304	96.88 %	25,573	94.79 %
Candidate	Party	Votes	%	Votes	%
Daniel Vaillant	PS	8,025	33.02 %	14,629	57.2 %
Jean Pierre Pierre-Bloch	UDF-PPDF	6,435	26.48 %	10,944	42.8 %
Patrice De Blignieres	FN	3,596	14.8 %		
Michel Turoman	PCF	1,805	7.43 %		
Jean Francois Blet	LV	1,195	4.92 %		
Annie Souchon	LO	989	4.07 %		
Patrick Maire	LDI	376	1.55 %		
Gabriel Pictet	GE	338	1.39 %		
Sarah Baruk	SRE (Note: Solidaires régions écologie)	309	1.27 %		
Raymond Delord	Independent	257	1.06 %		
Agnes Memin	SEGA	210	0.86 %		
Christiane Libouban	NERNA	194	0.8 %		
Stephanie Stein	for a 4 day workweek	183	0.75 %		
Marie Claude Schidlower	PT	134	0.55%		
Henri Morel-Maroger	MEI	127	0.52 %		
Pierre Yann Dieuaide	PH	73	0.3 %		
Alain Piller	MDR	44	0.18 %		
Thierry Telphon	PL (Note: Parti pour la liberté)	13	0.05 %		
Corinne Taieb-Haddad	Independent	1	0 %		

Table Notes 1997:

=== 2002 ===
Results of 2002 election, Paris's 19th constituency
		First round		Second round	
Registered Voters		40,115		40,107	
Abstentions		14,312	35.68 %	16,281	40.59 %
Votes		25,803	64.32 %	23,826	59.41 %
Total Votes		25,803		23,826	
Blank or Void ballots		380	1.47 %	784	3.29 %
Valid Votes		25,423	98.53 %	23,042	96.71 %
Candidate	Party	Votes	%	Votes	%
Daniel Vaillant	PS	9 396	36.96 %	13 447	58.36 %
Roxane Decorte	UMP	5 304	20.86 %	9 595	41.64 %
J.Pierre Pierre-Bloch	UDF	2 690	10.58 %		
Martial Bild	FN	2 136	8.4 %		
Claude Sergent	LV	1 668	6.56 %		
Olivier Besancenot	LCR	1 391	5.47 %		
Danielle Berlaimont	PCF	666	2.62 %		
Francois Gaudu	PR	483	1.9 %		
Patrick Berdah	Independent	418	1.64 %		
Bernadette Brossat	LO	243	0.96 %		
Alain Vauzelle	MNR	196	0.77 %		
Francois Deroche	UDF dissident	168	0.66 %		
Ihab Gazal	SEGA	148	0.58 %		
Bernard Mayaud	Cap21	132	0.52 %		
Christina Artaz	PT	98	0.39 %		
Veronique Rolland	ND	93	0.37 %		
Nathalie Ovion	EXG	63	0.25 %		
Nouhoume Ba	Independent	36	0.14 %		
J.Michel Coffin	CPNT	35	0.14 %		
David Gerbaudi	IR (Note: Initiative républicaine)	28	0.11 %		
Antoinette Di Ruzza	PH	19	0.07%		
Brice Mebo	GIP (Note: GIP - Démocratie active)	12	0.05%		
Antoine Hitoto	(Note: Parti des socioprofessionnels)	0	0%		

Table Notes 2002:

=== 2007 ===
Results of 2007 election, Paris's 19th constituency
		First round		Second round	
Registered Voters		48 139		48 135	
Abstentions		21,212	44.06 %	22,435	46.61 %
Votes		26,927	55.94 %	25,700	53.39 %
Total Votes		26,927		25,700	
Blank or Void ballots		339	1.26 %	677	2.63 %
Valid Votes		26,588	98.74 %	25,023	97.37 %
Candidate	Party	Votes	%	Votes	%
Daniel Vaillant	PS	10,006	37.63 %	15,778	63.05 %
Roxane Decorte	UMP	7,591	28.55 %	9,245	36.95 %
Fadila Mehal	MODEM	2 184	8.21 %		
Olivier Raynal	LV	1 766	6.64 %		
Anne Leclerc	LCR	1 259	4.74 %		
Francoise Germain-Robin	PCF	970	3.65 %		
Guillaume L'Huillier	FN	781	2.94 %		
Jacques Mendy	DVG	618	2.32 %		
David Pierre-Bloch	Independent	565	2.13 %		
Bernadette Brossat	LO	211	0.79 %		
Didier Marty	FA	207	0.78 %		
Francois Delaporte	MNR	154	0.58 %		
Nadia Bennadache	Parti Rachid Nekkaz	129	0.49 %		
Clarisse Delalondre	PT	118	0.44 %		
Jean Montane	PH	28	0.11 %		
Aldjia Ait Ouarab	UDF-MODEM	1	0 %		
