= Humanist Party (France) =

The Humanist Party (French: Parti humaniste) is a political party in France, and is a member of the Humanist International, and the European Humanist Regional.

In 1997, the Parti humaniste was officially recognised by the Commission nationale des comptes de campagne et des financements politiques, the French government agency that monitors political parties and audits their books. As of 2000, as it has not submitted its status nor books, it no longer appears in the records of official political parties and movements.
