= Caroline Yadan =

French politician (born 1968)

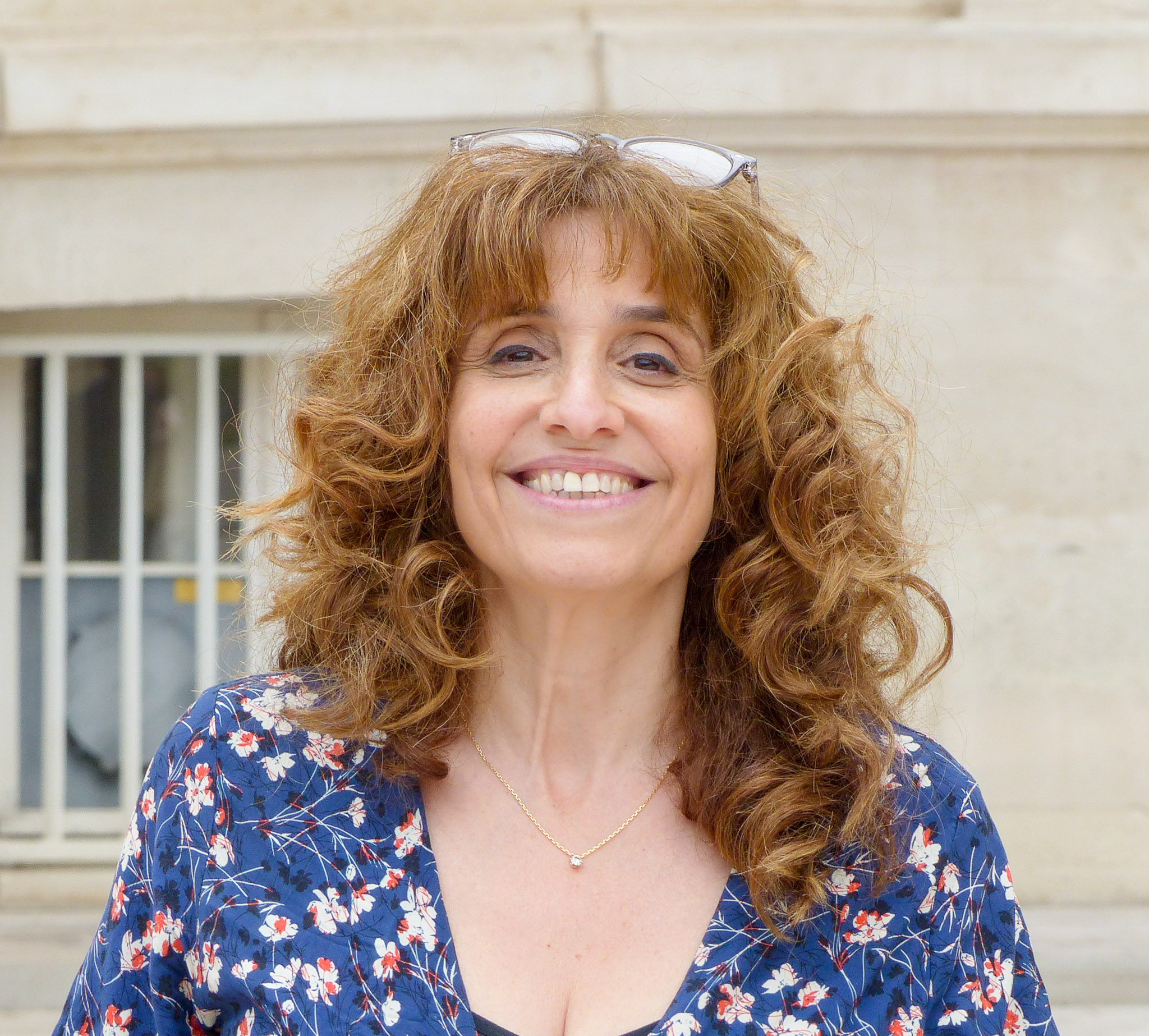
- Yadan in 2024

Member of the National Assembly
- Incumbent
- Assumed office 18 July 2024
- Preceded by: Meyer Habib
- Constituency: Eighth constituency for French residents overseas
- In office 23 July 2022 – 18 July 2024
- Preceded by: Stanislas Guerini
- Succeeded by: Léa Balage El Mariky
- Constituency: Paris's 3rd constituency

Personal details
- Born: Caroline Yadan Pesah; 14 August 1968 (age 58) Boulogne-Billancourt, France
- Party: Renaissance
- Education: Paris 1 Panthéon-Sorbonne University
- Occupation: Lawyer • Politician

Caroline Yadan Pesah (born 14 August 1968) is a French politician serving as the Member of Parliament for the Eighth constituency for French residents overseas, and who previously represented Paris's 3rd constituency from 2022 to 2024. In 2024, Yadan was the sponsor of the Yadan bill, which would expand the scope of crimes related to terrorism and antisemitism, including criminalization of those publicly advocating for the "destruction of a state recognised by the French Republic".

== Political positions ==
=== Israel ===
During Yadan's campaign, she emphasized her strong support for the State of Israel along with a desire to address antisemitism. Yadan previously characterized boycott of Israeli businesses at the Eurosatory exhibition as illegal. Israel Hayom described Yadan as a "Zionist Jew".

==== Yadan bill ====
In 2026, Yadan sponsored a bill to that sought to address 'new forms of antisemitism' in France. Known as the Yadan bill, the law would expand criminal penalties for those convicted of "implicit" incitement to terrorism, glorification of terrorism, along with creating a new criminal offense for publicly calling for the "destruction of a state recognised by the French Republic".

The Yadan bill attracted criticism from advocates for freedom of the press and free speech.

== See also ==
- List of deputies of the 16th National Assembly of France
- List of deputies of the 17th National Assembly of France
