= Paris's 3rd constituency =

Constituency of the National Assembly of France

3rd constituency of Paris
- inline Constituency of the National Assembly of France

- Paris, showing its legislative constituency boundaries from 2012
- Deputy: Léa Balage El Mariky; LÉ
- Department: Paris
- Registered voters: 73,178

3rd constituency of Paris
- inline Constituency of the National Assembly of France

- Paris, showing its legislative constituencies between 1988 and 2012
- Member: constituency abolished, 2012
- Department: Paris

Map of Paris constituencies in 1981.

The 3rd constituency of Paris (French: Troisième circonscription de Paris) is a French legislative constituency in the Paris département (75). Like the other 576 French constituencies, it elects one MP using the two-round system. The constituency is located in the north of Paris.

The present constituency has existed since the 2012 election, having been created by the 2010 redistricting of French legislative constituencies.

From 1958–1986, the 3rd constituency referred to a constituency with different boundaries, and again from 1988–2012, having been created by the 1986 redistricting of French legislative constituencies. For the 1986 election, proportional representation was used.

== Historic representation ==
Election	Member	Party	Source
1958	Jean-Marie Le Pen	CNIP	
1962	René Capitant	UNR	
1967	René Capitant	UDR	
1968	René Capitant	UDR	
1968	Jean Tiberi	UDR	
1973	Jean Tiberi	UDR	
1976	Monique Tisné	UDR	
1978	Jean Tiberi	RPR	
1981	Jean Tiberi	RPR	
1986	Proportional representation - no election by constituency		
1988	Édouard Frédéric-Dupont	CNIP	
1993	Michel Roussin	RPR	
1993	Martine Aurillac	RPR	
1997	Martine Aurillac	RPR	
2002	Martine Aurillac	UMP	
2007	Martine Aurillac	UMP	
2012	Annick Lepetit	PS	
2017	Stanislas Guerini	LREM	
2022	Stanislas Guerini	RE	
2022	Caroline Yadan	RE	
2024	Léa Balage El Mariky	LÉ	

== Election results ==
=== 2024 ===
Candidate	Party	Alliance	First round			Second round		
Candidate	Party	Alliance	Votes	%	+/–	Votes	%	+/–
Léa Balage El Mariky	LÉ	NFP	24,441	46.15	+7.49	25,915	53.59	+4.59
Stanislas Guerini	RE	ENS	18,001	33.99	+1.48	22,444	46.41	-4.59
Olga Podolskaia	RN		4,709	8.89	+4.70			
Paul Hatte	LR		4,118	7.78	-5.38			
Marie Courtois	REC		486	0.92	-2.68			
Côme Cirtoen	DVE		433	0.82	N/A			
Laurent Burtaire	LO		232	0.44	-0.23			
Grégory Fernandes	EXG		151	0.29	N/A			
Quentin Laporte	DVC		116	0.22	N/A			
Warda Bailiche	DVD		102	0.19	N/A			
Larent Semat	DIV		92	0.17	N/A			
Thierry Alquier	DIV		81	0.15	N/A			
Irène Gasarian	DVG		0	0.00	N/A			
Valid votes			52,962	98.70	±0.00	48,359	96.03	+0.21
Blank votes			464	0.86	-0.12	1,483	2.94	-0.13
Null votes			236	0.44	+0.12	515	1.02	-0.09
Turnout			53,662	73.33	+18.59	50,357	68.81	+13.94
Abstentions			19,516	26.67	-18.59	22,821	31.19	-13.94
Registered voters			73,178			73,178		
Source: Ministry of the Interior, Le Monde
Result						LÉ GAIN FROM RE		

=== 2022 ===
Legislative Election 2022: Paris's 3rd constituency
Party	Candidate	Votes	%	±%
EELV (NUPÉS)	Léa Balage El Mariky	15,284	38.66	+9.20
LREM (Ensemble)	Stanislas Guerini	12,851	32.50	-12.58
LR (UDC)	Alix Bougeret	5,204	13.16	N/A
RN	Marie-Emilie Euphrasie	1,658	4.19	+0.74
DVG	Ayodele Ikuesan	1,625	4.11	N/A
REC	Cécile Fischer	1,422	3.60	N/A
DVE	Laurent Baffie	863	2.18	N/A
Others	N/A	630		
Turnout		40,063	54.74	−1.79
2nd round result
LREM (Ensemble)	Stanislas Guerini	19,612	51.00	-14.50
EELV (NUPÉS)	Léa Balage El Mariky	18,843	49.00	N/A
Turnout		38,455	54.87	+10.24
LREM hold				

=== 2017 ===
Legislative Election 2017: Paris's 3rd constituency
Party	Candidate	Votes	%	±%
LREM	Stanislas Guerini	17,321	45.08	N/A
UDI	Valérie Nahmias	5,960	15.51	−14.70
PS	Annick Lepetit	4,846	12.61	−32.13
LFI	Laurent Levard	4,610	12.00	N/A
EELV	Adrien Delassus	1,864	4.85	−1.10
FN	Aurélien Legrand	1,327	3.45	−2.72
Others	N/A	2,497	6.50	
Turnout		38,825	56.53	−1.25
2nd round result
LREM	Stanislas Guerini	17,801	65.50	N/A
UDI	Valérie Nahmias	9,376	34.50	−5.66
Turnout		30,652	44.63	−10.28
LREM gain from PS		Swing		

=== 2012 ===
Legislative Election 2012: Paris's 3rd constituency
Party	Candidate	Votes	%	±%
PS	Annick Lepetit	16,803	44.74	
UMP	Valérie Paparemborde	11,348	30.21	
FN	Catherine Cremoux	2,316	6.17	
EELV	Agnès Michel	2,233	5.95	
FG	Frédérique Laizet	1,989	5.30	
MoDem	Thierry Coudert	1,242	3.31	
Others	N/A	1,628		
Turnout		37,559	57.78	
2nd round result
PS	Annick Lepetit	21,353	59.84	
UMP	Valérie Paparemborde	14,331	40.16	
Turnout		35,684	54.91	
PS win (new boundaries)				

=== 2007 ===
Elections between 1988 and 2007 were based on the 1988 boundaries.

Map of Paris Constituencies, 1988-2007 elections

Legislative Election 2007: Paris's 3rd constituency
Party	Candidate	Votes	%	±%
UMP	Martine Aurillac	16,278	59.03	
PS	Laurence Girard	4,673	16.95	
MoDem	Bruno Lalouette	3,033	11.00	
FN	Dominique-France Waldbillig	646	2.34	
LV	Louis Jouve	578	2.10	
Others	N/A	2,368		
Turnout		27,576	63.35	
UMP hold				

=== 2002 ===
Legislative Election 2002: Paris's 3rd constituency
Party	Candidate	Votes	%	±%
UMP	Martine Aurillac	14,164	48.78	
PS	Marie-Claire Champoux	5,206	17.93	
DIV	Christian Blanc	2,797	9.63	
UDF	Yves Pozzo di Borgo	2,654	9.14	
FN	Dominique Waldbillig	1,544	5.32	
LV	Maggie Cazal	856	2.95	
Others	N/A	1,816		
Turnout		29,214	70.83	
2nd round result
UMP	Martine Aurillac	17,803	71.88	
PS	Marie-Claire Champoux	6,964	28.12	
Turnout		25,429	61.66	
UMP hold				

=== 1997 ===
Legislative Election 1997: Paris's 3rd constituency
Party	Candidate	Votes	%	±%
RPR	Martine Aurillac	12,568	44.18	
PS	Anne Kalch	5,356	18.83	
DVD	Jean-Philippe Hubin	3,829	13.46	
FN	Loïc Le Hénand	2,518	8.85	
LV	Luc-Laurent Salvador	881	3.10	
PCF	Noëlle Mansoux	830	2.92	
Others	N/A	2,467		
Turnout		29,121	62.91	
2nd round result
RPR	Martine Aurillac	20,298	70.94	
PS	Anne Kalch	8,314	29.06	
Turnout		29,654	64.07	
RPR hold				
