= Annick Lepetit =

French politician

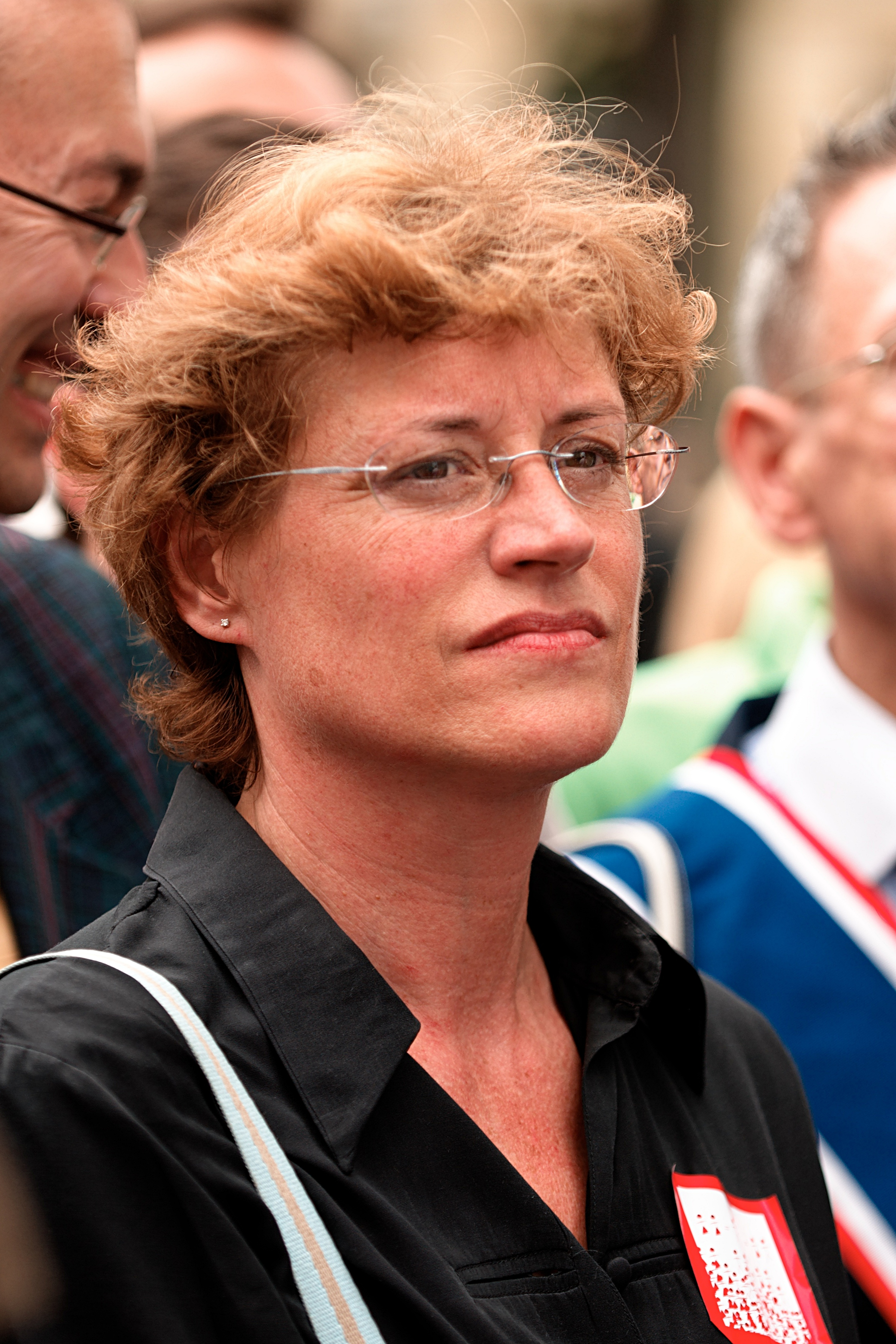
- Annick Lepetit in 2008

Member of the Council of Paris
- Incumbent
- Assumed office 25 March 2001
- Mayor: Bertrand Delanoë; Anne Hidalgo

Member of the National Assembly for Paris's 17th constituency
- In office 2003–2017
- Succeeded by: Stanislas Guerini

Mayor of the 18th arrondissement of Paris
- In office 2001–2003
- Preceded by: Daniel Vaillant
- Succeeded by: Daniel Vaillant

Personal details
- Born: 31 March 1958 (age 68) Boulogne-Billancourt, France
- Party: Socialist Party
- Education: Centre de formation et de perfectionnement des journalistes (CFPJ)

Annick Lepetit (French pronunciation: [anik ləpəti]; born 31 March 1958) is a French politician who was a member of the National Assembly of France from 2012-2017. She represented the city of Paris, and was a member of the Socialiste, radical, citoyen et divers gauche.
