= Léa Balage El Mariky =

French politician (born 1990)

Member of the National Assembly for Paris's 3rd constituency
- Incumbent
- Assumed office 18 July 2024
- Preceded by: Caroline Yadan

Personal details
- Born: 9 April 1990 (age 36) Évry, France
- Party: The Ecologists; NFP
- Education: Sciences Po

Léa Balage El Mariky (born 9 April 1990) is a French politician of The Ecologists who was elected member of the National Assembly for Paris's 3rd constituency in 2024. She serves as deputy mayor of the 18th arrondissement of Paris, and was a candidate for the constituency in 2022.

== Biography ==
Léa Balage El Mariky was born on April 9, 1990, in Évry, Essonne in the Essonne department.

Her family moved to Bègles in Gironde when she was six years old. Her father was a car salesman and her mother alternated between periods of unemployment and work. At the age of 11, she was elected to the Bègles Youth City Council. After obtaining a law degree in Bordeaux, she enrolled at Sciences Po Paris in 2012 and, after failing the ENA entrance exam in 2015, became the parliamentary assistant to journalist and environmentalist politician Noël Mamère.

In 2016, in response to the proposed law on revoking citizenship of dual citizens, she chose to add her mother's name, El Mariky, who is of Moroccan origin, to her own name. She also launched a petition denouncing the Employment discrimination she claims her mother has suffered at work.

She joined The Ecologists executive committee in 2019.

Deputy Mayor Éric Lejoindre of the 18th arrondissement of Paris since 2020, responsible for community life, sustainable food, short supply chains, and school meals, she is also the representative for the Chapelle Nord neighborhood council.
