= Yadan bill =

2026 proposed legislation in France

National Assembly
- Territorial extent: France

Legislative history
- Committee responsible: Law Committee
- First reading: 16 April 2026
- Status: Withdrawn

The Yadan bill (French: loi Yadan), also known as Bill 575, was a controversial piece of French legislation aimed at addressing "renewed forms of antisemitism", sponsored by MP Caroline Yadan.

The bill would have expanded the scope of incitement to terrorism and glorification of terrorism, both criminal offenses, to include speech which implicitly justifies or minimises terrorist acts. It would have also criminalised advocating for the destruction of a state recognised by France. Critics of the bill said that the bill conflated legitimate criticism of Israel and the genocide in Gaza with antisemitism.

On 16 April 2026, following mass protests including a petition against the bill which gathered over 700,000 signatures, the bill was withdrawn by its proponents before debate in the National Assembly.

== Background ==
Under current French law, "direct" incitement to terrorism is punishable.

Caroline Yadan is a member of parliament representing French citizens living abroad, including in Israel. Elected in 2024 as a member of the Renaissance Party, Yadan is Jewish. During her campaign, she emphasized her strong support of Israel and desire to fight antisemitism, and said:

"I have always fought antisemitism, but since October 7 and the rise in antisemitism, I am very focused on the fight to eradicate antisemitism, and this is one of my main goals as a parliament member. For me, it's also a personal matter, and it's important to me to reduce the flames of hatred burning in certain parts of French society. I also do everything to show the French people the positive aspects of Israel and present the country in a positive light."

== Provisions ==
The bill seeks to address "renewed forms of antisemitism". This includes criminal offenses for "implicit" incitement to terrorism, glorification of terrorism, and the creation of a new offense of publicly calling for the "destruction of a state recognised by the French Republic". Both Israel and Palestine are recognized as states by the French Republic.

According to Yadan, slogans such as "from the river to the sea" are a "call for destruction and should be punished if the law is adopted." In an interview with The Jerusalem Post, Yadan also expressed interest in making punishable by the law "where maps of Israel have been replaced with Palestine". Yadan added, "this, so that Rima Hassan can no longer consider Hamas a resistance group and go unpunished or that one could no longer post a Nazi flag accompanied by a Star of David on one's social networks."

In February 2026, French Prime Minister Sébastien Lecornu spoke at the annual conference of the Representative Council of French Jewish Institutions (CRIF) on the bill, saying that "calling for the destruction of the State of Israel is calling to endanger the lives of a people," and "cannot be tolerated any longer." Lecornu added that "contemporary anti-Zionism has become the mask of an old anti-Semitism."

== Legislative history ==
The bill was introduced to the National Assembly in October 2024 by Yadan and former Equality Minister and National Assembly member Aurore Bergé. The bill was co-signed by 90 other deputies. According to The Jerusalem Post, former French President François Hollande agreed to co-sign the bill.

On 18 January 2026, the most recent version of the bill was passed by the National Assembly's law committee 18 to 16.

The bill is expected to be considered by the National Assembly on 16 April 2026.

== Reaction ==
Proponents of the bill include the far-right National Rally party, the right-wing Les Républicains, and the centre-right bloc, along with several members of the Socialist party. Former French President François Hollande also supports the bill.

Opponents of the bill, including members of parliament La France Insoumise, the Socialist Party, and the Greens have argued the bill is an attempt to criminalise criticism of Israel.

France's Human Rights League's president Nathalie Tehio said the bill could fuel antisemitism, adding "it equates French Jews with Israel – which is dangerous in and of itself, as this very equation fuels anti-Semitism."

On 26 January 2026, the French Lawyers' Union issued a warning against the law, writing that the criminalization of statements that "implicitly" incite or justify terrorism would turn judges into "thought police".

On 26 March 2026, the France Palestine Solidarity Association (French: Association France Palestine Solidarité) issued a statement condemning the law, writing that the bill was "an attack on the freedom to criticize Israeli policy under the guise of fighting alleged "renewed forms of anti-Semitism"."

On 3 April 2026, the European Civic Forum wrote that "If passed, the law risks being exploited to suppress solidarity with the Palestinian people and public criticism of Israel's state policies, undermining both freedom of expression and the fight against antisemitism, as well as posing a big risk of censorship."

On 7 April 2026, Reporters Without Borders wrote in a statement that the bill "runs a major risk of creating a chilling effect on the coverage of sensitive topics."

In the week of 11 April 2026, a petition against the bill on the National Assembly's official website surpassed 500,000 signatures. This was the second petition on the National Assembly website to reach the 500,000 signature mark.

Harrison Stetler wrote in American socialist magazine Jacobin that the bill was a "brazen attempt to silence France's Palestine solidarity movement."

On 14 April 2026, the Office of the High Commissioner for Human Rights issued a statement condemning the bill, writing "The so-called 'PPL Yadan' Bill would dangerously expand the already vague and overbroad offence of 'glorification of terrorism' under French law. Its undue restriction of freedom of expression and opinion would also chill legitimate public debate and human rights advocacy, including on Palestine and Israel."

== See also ==
- Antisemitism in France
- New antisemitism
- Never Again is Now: Protecting, Preserving and Strengthening Jewish Life in Germany
