= Daniel Vaillant =

French politician

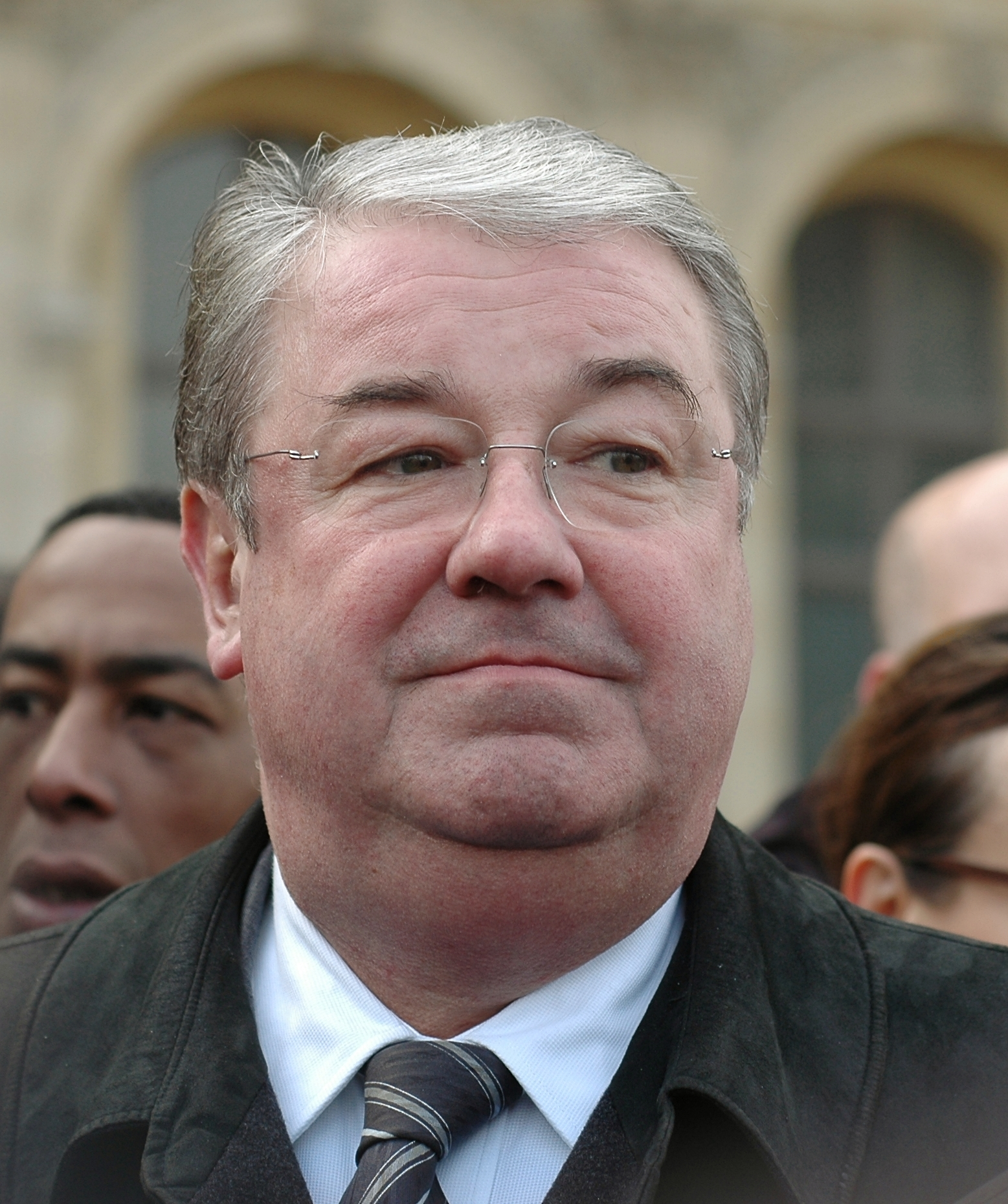
- Daniel Vaillant in 2006

Minister of the Interior
- In office 29 August 2000 – 6 May 2002
- President: Jacques Chirac
- Prime Minister: Lionel Jospin
- Preceded by: Jean-Pierre Chevènement
- Succeeded by: Nicolas Sarkozy

Minister for the Relation with the Parliament
- In office 4 June 1997 – 29 August 2002
- President: Jacques Chirac
- Prime Minister: Lionel Jospin
- Preceded by: Roger Romani
- Succeeded by: Jean-Jack Queyranne

Mayor of the 18th arrondissement of Paris
- In office 1995–2014
- Preceded by: Roger Chinaud
- Succeeded by: Éric Lejoindre

Member of the National Assembly for Paris's 19th constituency
- In office 1988–1993
- Preceded by: Proportional Representation per department
- Succeeded by: Jean-Pierre Pierre-Bloch

Member of the National Assembly for Paris's 19th constituency
- In office 1994–1997
- Preceded by: Jean-Pierre Pierre-Bloch
- Succeeded by: Daniel Marcovitch

Member of the National Assembly for Paris's 19th constituency
- In office 19 June 2002 – 2012
- Preceded by: Daniel Marcovitch
- Succeeded by: Constituency abolished – same area now in Paris's 17th constituency

Member of the National Assembly for Paris's 17th constituency
- In office 2012 – 21 June 2017
- Preceded by: Annick Lepetit (different area of Paris, moved to Paris's 3rd constituency in redistricting)
- Succeeded by: Danièle Obono

Personal details
- Born: 19 July 1949 (age 76) Lormes, France
- Party: Socialist Party

Daniel Vaillant (born 19 July 1949) is a French Socialist politician.

== Biography ==
Close to Lionel Jospin, Vaillant held several ministerial portfolios in his cabinets: Minister of the Relations with Parliament from 1997 to 2000 and Interior Minister from 2000 to 2002. He also supported Jospin as candidate for the Socialist Party in the 2007 presidential election; a candidacy which eventually did not materialize.

As of 2009, he is mayor of the 18th arrondissement of Paris (first election 1995) and a member of the National Assembly.

In October 2009, he proposed to decriminalize the personal use of cannabis through control of production and import, as is the case with alcohol.

== Published work ==
- C'est à ma gauche, Éditions Plon, 2003 (with a foreword by Lionel Jospin « La Sécurité, priorité à gauche »)
- PS : 40 ans d'histoire(s). Du congrès d'Épinay à nos jours, Éditions L'Archipel, 2011, 414 p. ISBN 978-2-8098-0481-2

Political offices
Preceded by Jean-Pierre Chevènement	Minister of the Interior; 2000–2002	Succeeded by Nicolas Sarkozy
