= Jean-Pierre Reveau =

French politician

- Born: 27 July 1932 (age 93); Paris, France
- Occupation: Politician
- Political party: National Front

Jean-Pierre Reveau (born 1932) is a French politician.

== Early life ==
Jean-Pierre Reveau was born on 27 July 1932 in Paris, France.

== Career ==
Reveau joined the National Front. He served as a member of the National Assembly representing the Rhône from 1986 to 1988.

In the 1990s, Reveau served as the treasurer of the National Front. He was excluded from the party in 2011.
