= Ian Brossat =

French politician (born 1980)

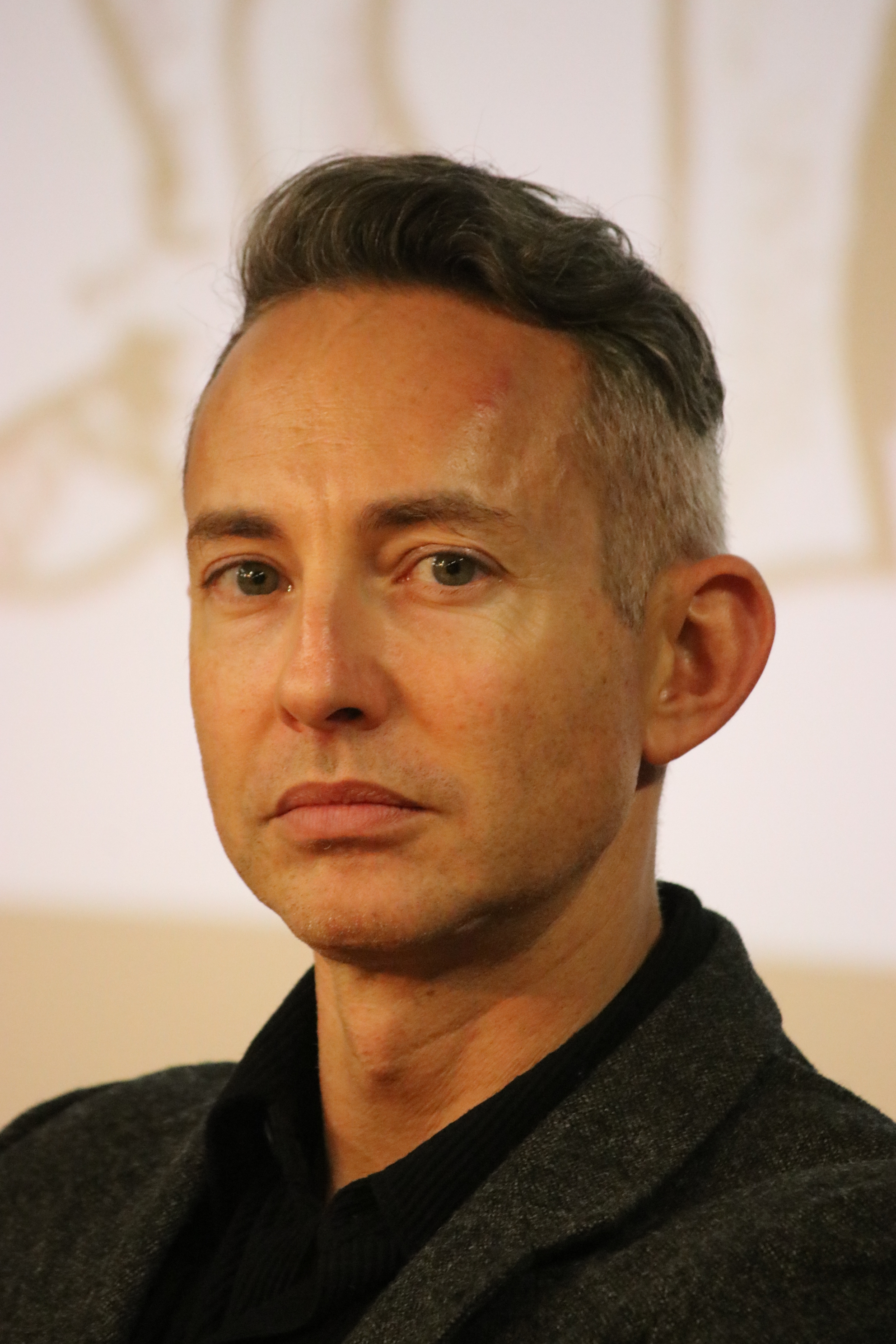
- Ian Brossat in 2023.

French senator
- Incumbent
- Assumed office 2 October 2023
- Parliamentary group: CRCE-K
- Constituency: Paris

Member of the Council of Paris
- Incumbent
- Assumed office 21 March 2008
- Mayor: Bertrand Delanoë; Anne Hidalgo

Personal details
- Born: 23 April 1980 (age 46) Fontenay-aux-Roses, France
- Party: French Communist Party
- Spouse: Brice (m. 2013)
- Education: Lycée Henri-IV
- Alma mater: École normale supérieure de Lyon

Ian Brossat (French pronunciation: [jan bʁɔsa]; born 23 April 1980) is a French politician and since September 2023 a member of the Senate representing the Communist Party, sitting with the Communist, Republican, Citizen and Ecologist group.

== Biography ==
Ian Brossat is the son of Alain Brossat, a philosopher and professor at University of Paris VIII, and Swedish-born Sylvia Klingberg. Brossat's grandfather Marcus Klingberg was a Polish-born Israeli epidemiologist, veteran of the Red Army and Soviet spy. His maternal grandmother, Adjia Eisman (also known as Wanda Yashinskaya), was a Holocaust survivor all of whose family perished.

From 2008 he was a member of the Paris Council, representing the 18th arrondissement, elected as a Communist. He stood for election to the National Assembly in 2012, losing to Daniel Vaillant.

Brossat graduated from the École normale supérieure de Lyon. Ian Brossat is gay; he married his husband Brice in 2013.
