= 2008 Paris municipal election =

Local election in France

- 9 and 16 March 2008

All 163 members of the Council of Paris 82 seats needed for a majority
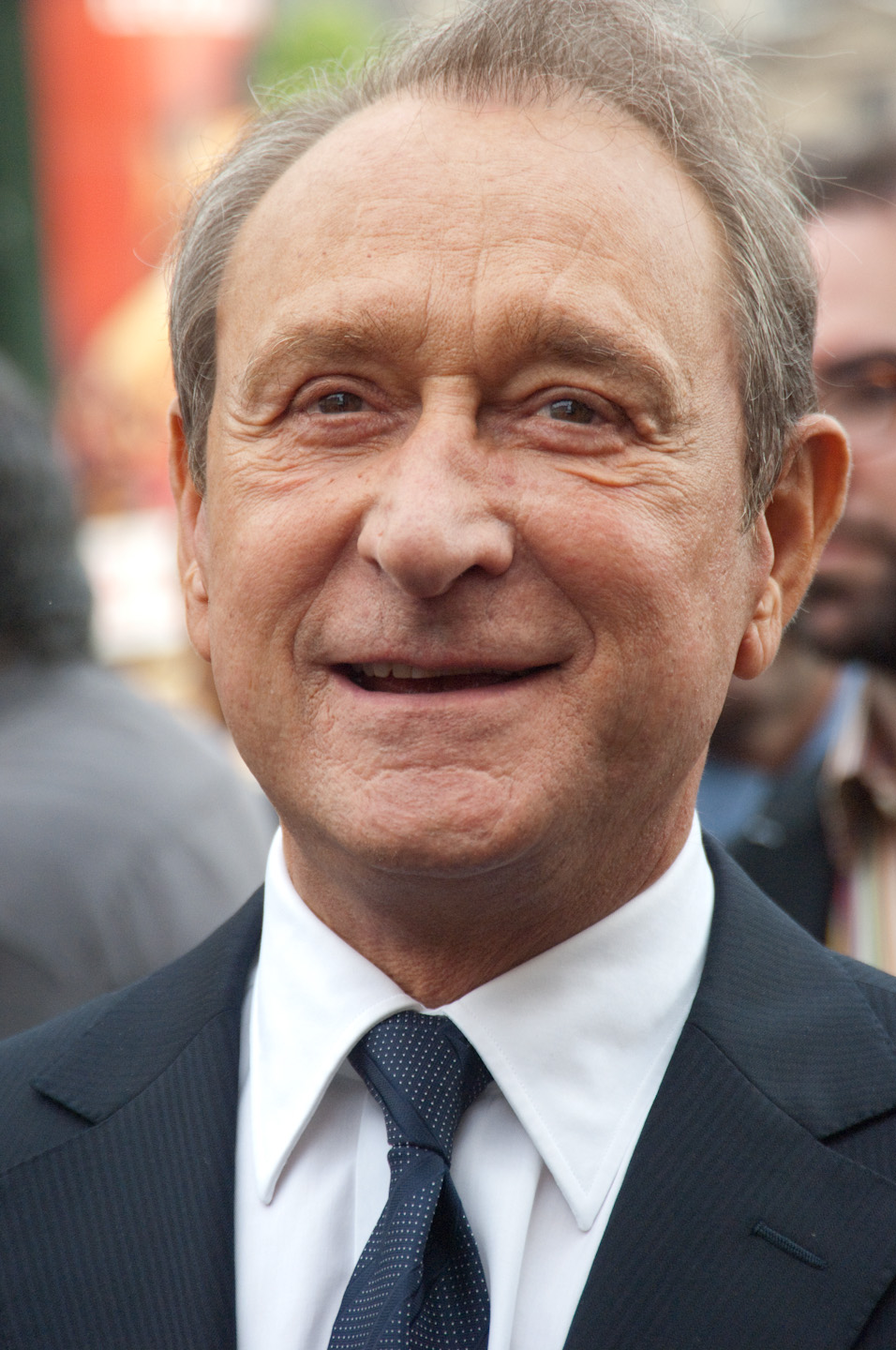

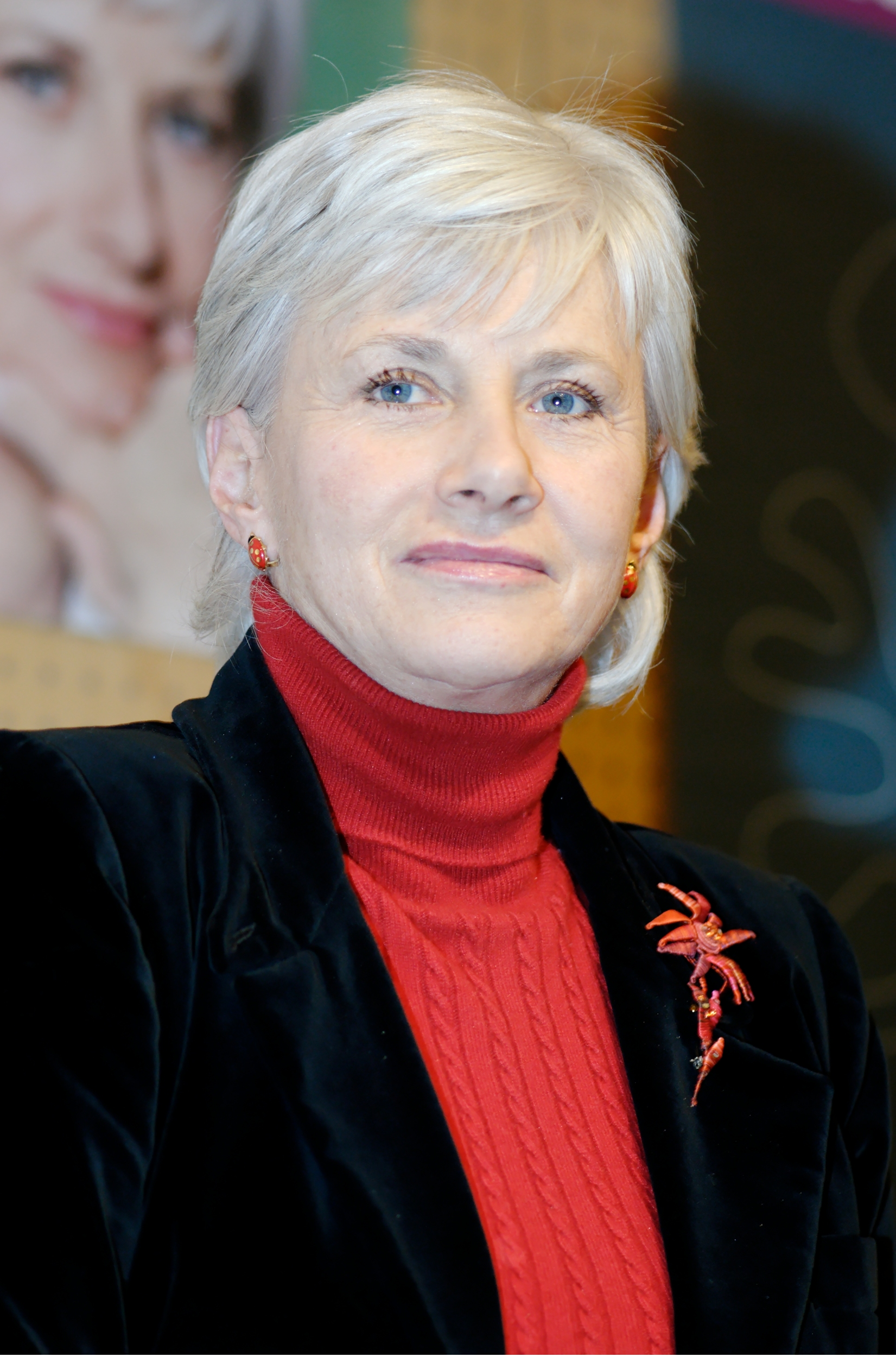

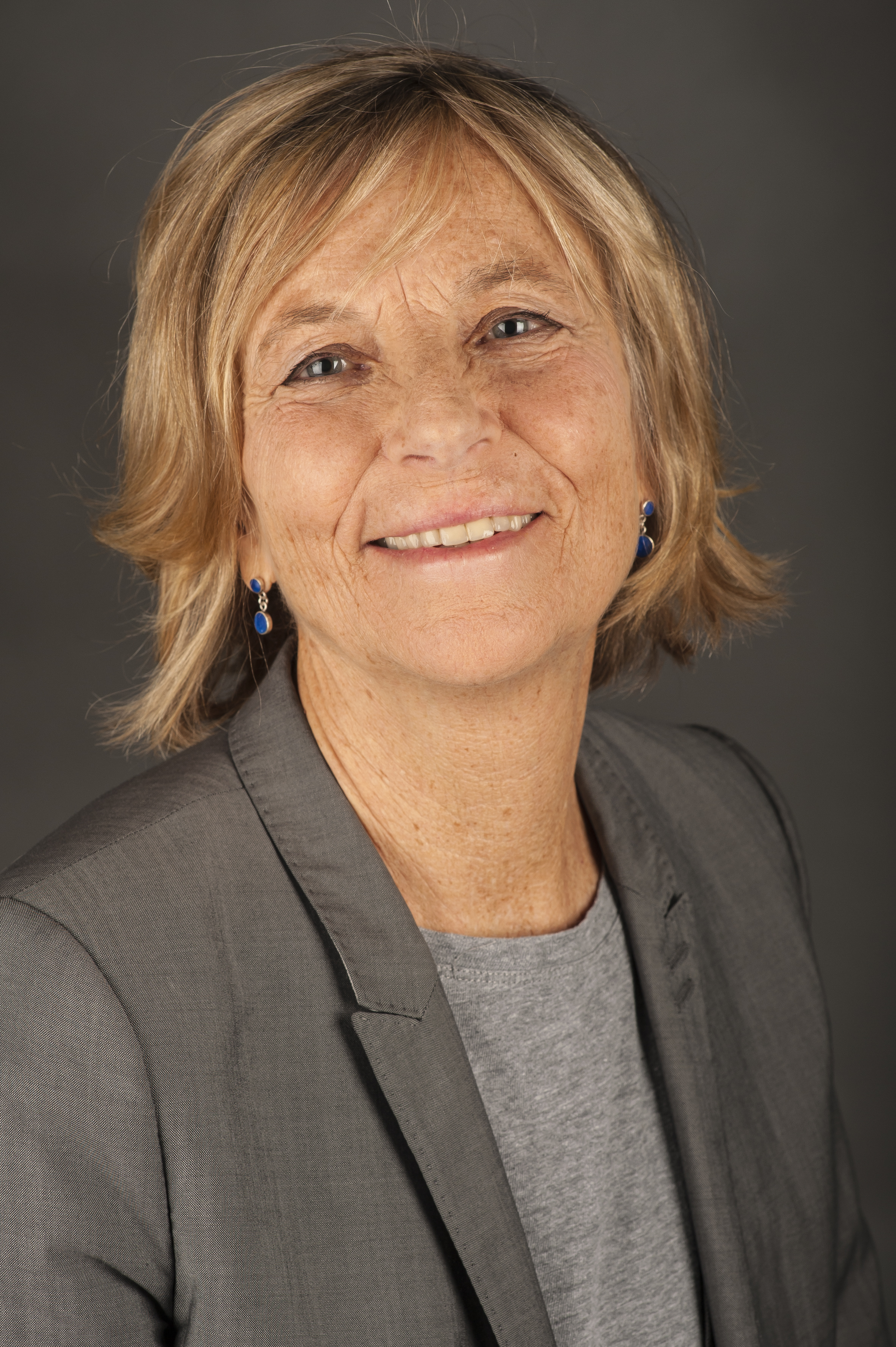

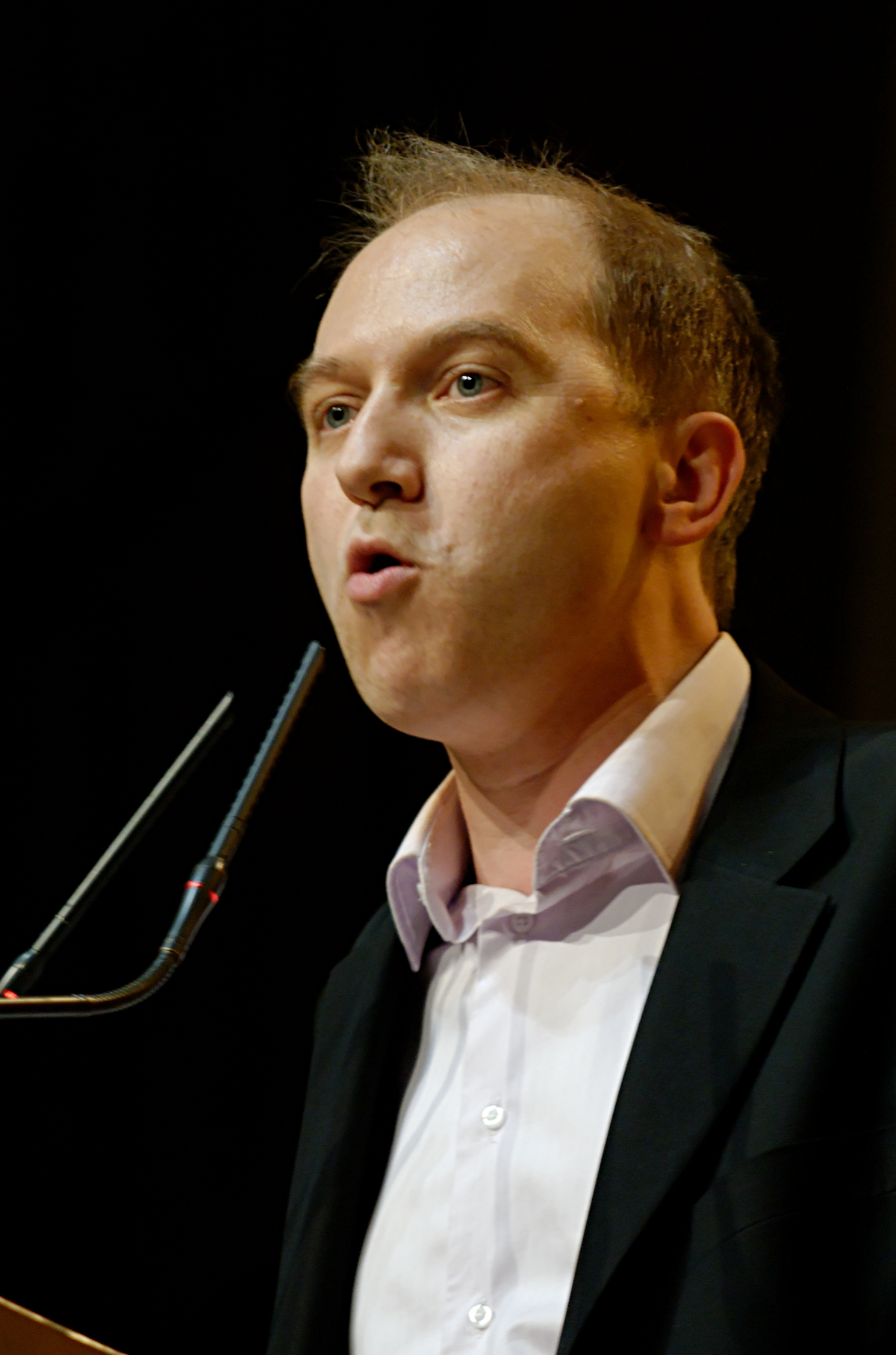
	Majority party	Minority party
Leader	Bertrand Delanoë	Françoise de Panafieu
Party	PS	UMP
Leader's seat	18th Arrondissement	17th Arrondissement
Last election	49.60%, 69 seats	36.17%, 56 seats
Seats won	86	61
Seat change	▲17	▼7
Popular vote	298 899	186,839
Percentage	57.71%	36.07%
	Third party	Fourth party
Leader	Marielle de Sarnez	Denis Baupin
Party	MoDem	The Greens
Leader's seat	12th Arrondissement	20th Arrondissement
Last election		12.35%, 23 seats
Seats won	1	11
Seat change	▲1	▼12
Popular vote	12,240	46,883
Percentage	2.36%	6.78%
- Results of arrondissement mayoral elections
Mayor before election
Bertrand Delanoë
PS
Mayor-Elect
Bertrand Delanoë
PS

The 2008 Paris municipal elections were held on 9 and 16 March 2008, at the same time as other French municipal elections. The incumbent Mayor of Paris, Bertrand Delanoë (PS), faced UMP candidate Françoise de Panafieu who was chosen to head his party's list in a primary election held in 2006. The MoDem MEP and François Bayrou supporter, Marielle de Sarnez, was the centrist candidate.

Control of the 20 arrondissements of the French capital was also to be decided in the elections. Of these, the PS-Greens-MRC controlled 12 (10 PS, 1 Green, 1 MRC) and the UMP eight. 163 councillors were due to be elected in the 20 arrondissements. As a result of the election, Bertrand Delanoë was re-elected with a larger majority. The left controls 99 seats against 63 for the right, two for other right-wing dissidents, and one MoDem.

== Results ==
=== 1st Arrondissement ===
Municipal election 2008: 1st Arrondissement
Party	Candidate	Votes	%	±%
UMP	Jean-François Legaret	2,641	43.10%	
PS	Seybah Dagoma	2,289	37.36%	
MoDem	Paule Champetier de Ribes	531	8.67%	
LV	Laurence Bonnet	439	7.17%	
FN	Cyrille Rey-Coquais	152	2.48%	
LO	Marie-Madeleine Lacroix	75	1.22%	
Turnout		6,127		
UMP	Jean-François Legaret	3,366	52.76%	
PS	Seybah Dagoma	3,014	47.24%	
Turnout		6,380		
UMP hold		Swing		

=== 2nd Arrondissement ===
Municipal election 2008: 2nd Arrondissement
Party	Candidate	Votes	%	±%
PS	Sylvie Wieviorka	2,231	33.12%	
LV	Jacques Boutault	2,016	29.93%	
UMP	Christophe Lekieffre	1,543	22.91%	
MoDem	François Guiliana	621	9.22%	
FN	Christiane Pacros	167	2.48%	
LO	Jean-Pierre Dalmas	90	1.34%	
DVD	Marie-Christine Blin	68	1.01%	
Turnout		6,736		
LV	Jacques Boutault	4,363	68.34%	
UMP	Christophe Lekieffre	2,021	31.66%	
Turnout		6,736		
LV hold		Swing		

=== 3rd Arrondissement ===
Municipal election 2008: 3rd Arrondissement
Party	Candidate	Votes	%	±%
PS	Pierre Aidenbaum	6,685	55.83%	
UMP	Martine Weill-Raynal	2,458	20.53%	
LV	Laurence Hugues	1,237	10.33%	
MoDem	Raphaële Bidault-Waddington	1,111	9.28%	
FN	Annie Viguier	258	2.15%	
LO	Jean-Pierre Luciano	133	1.11%	
Workers' Party	Hélène Rubinstein-Carrera	92	0.77%	
Turnout		11,974		
PS hold		Swing		

=== 4th Arrondissement ===
Municipal election 2008: 4th Arrondissement
Party	Candidate	Votes	%	±%
PS	Dominique Bertinotti	5,127	48.49%	
UMP	Vincent Roger	3,312	31.33%	
MoDem	Fadila Mehal	863	8.16%	
LV	Corine Faugeron	834	7.89%	
FN	Jacques Vivies	286	2.71%	
LO	Marie-José Borsari	151	1.43%	
Turnout		10,573		
PS	Dominique Bertinotti	6,219	60.95%	
UMP	Vincent Roger	3,985	39.05%	
Turnout		10,204		
PS hold		Swing		

=== 5th Arrondissement ===
Municipal election 2008: 5th Arrondissement
Party	Candidate	Votes	%	±%
UMP	Jean Tiberi	8,958	37.94%	
PS	Lyne Cohen-Solal	8,187	34.67%	
MoDem	Philippe Meyer	3,385	14.33%	
LV	Laurent Audouin	1,287	5.45%	
LCR	Sophie Bournazel	563	2.38%	
DVD	Edouard Bonhomme	551	2.33%	
FN	Daniel Philippon	418	1.77%	
DVD	Rudy Desnos	140	0.59%	
Workers' Party	Vincent Debat	125	0.53%	
Turnout		23,614		
UMP	Jean Tiberi	11,269	45.00%	
PS	Lyne Cohen-Solal	11,044	44.10%	
MoDem	Philippe Meyer	2,730	10.90%	
Turnout		25,043		
UMP hold		Swing		

=== 6th Arrondissement ===
Municipal election 2008: 6th Arrondissement
Party	Candidate	Votes	%	±%
UMP	Jean-Pierre Lecoq	7,269	46.93%	
PS	Romain Levy	5,166	33.35%	
MoDem	Anne-Sophie Godefroy-Genin	1,530	9.88%	
LV	Louis Jouve	590	3.81%	
Independent	Jean-Marc Restoux	577	3.73%	
FN	Pierre Beaudu	356	2.30%	
Turnout		15,488		
UMP	Jean-Pierre Lecoq	8,412	56.04%	
PS	Romain Levy	6,599	43.96%	
Turnout		15,011		
UMP hold		Swing		

=== 7th Arrondissement ===
Municipal election 2008: 7th Arrondissement
Party	Candidate	Votes	%	±%
UMP	Rachida Dati	8,894	49.50%	
PS	Laurence Girard	4,080	22.71%	
MoDem	Véronique Delvolve	2,819	15.69%	
DVD	Olivier Bidou	850	4.73%	
FN	Jean-Richard Sulzer	537	2.99%	
LV	Catherine Ronge	535	2.98%	
AR	Yves-Marie Adeline	172	0.96%	
Workers' Party	Abdelhak-Salih Branki	80	0.45%	
Turnout		17,967		
UMP	Rachida Dati	9,934	57.69%	
PS	Laurence Girard	4,680	27.18%	
MoDem	Véronique Delvolve	2,607	15.14%	
Turnout		17,221		
UMP hold		Swing		

=== 8th Arrondissement ===
Municipal election 2008: 8th Arrondissement
Party	Candidate	Votes	%	±%
DVD	François Lebel	4,376	35.51%	
UMP	Pierre Lellouche	4,119	33.42%	
PS	Heidi Rancon-Cavenel	2,302	18.68%	
MoDem	Monique Baruti	808	6.56%	
LV	Martine Lebranchu	318	2.58%	
FN	Jean Mairey	293	2.38%	
Independent	Line Stambouli	109	0.88%	
Turnout		12,325		
DVD	François Lebel	5,956	48.55%	
UMP	Pierre Lellouche	3,903	31.82%	
PS	Heidi Rancon-Cavenel	2,408	19.63%	
Turnout		12,267		
DVD hold		Swing		

=== 9th Arrondissement ===
Municipal election 2008: 9th Arrondissement
Party	Candidate	Votes	%	±%
PS	Jacques Bravo	10,163	49.23%	
UMP	Delphine Bürkli	6,353	30.78%	
MoDem	Grégory Perrin	1,659	8.04%	
LV	Nicole Azzaro	1,299	6.29%	
FN	Annie Thierry	267	2.75%	
LCR	Fanny Gallot	493	2.39%	
LO	Charline Joliveau	109	0.53%	
Turnout		20,643	59.08%	
PS	Jacques Bravo	12,416	63.03%	
UMP	Delphine Bürkli	7,283	36.97%	
Turnout		19,699		
PS hold		Swing		

=== 10th Arrondissement ===
Municipal election 2008: 10th Arrondissement
Party	Candidate	Votes	%	±%
PS	Rémi Féraud	13,766	48.54%	
UMP	Linda Asmani	4,513	15.91%	
LV	Véronique Dubarry	2,564	9.04%	
MoDem	Géraldine Martiano	2,348	8.28%	
DVD	Bernard Quesson	1,275	4.50%	
LCR	Sylvain Pattieu	1,228	4.33%	
Independent	Gaspard Delanoë	898	3.17%	
FN	Marie-Claire de la Sayette	837	2.95%	
Far left	Mathieu Cologan	605	2.13%	
LO	Charline Joliveau	173	0.61%	
Workers' Party	Denis Mont	152	0.54%	
Turnout		28,359		
PS	Rémi Féraud	19,667	74.96%	
UMP	Linda Asmani	6,569	25.04%	
Turnout		26,236		
PS hold		Swing		

=== 11th Arrondissement ===
Municipal election 2008: 11th Arrondissement
Party	Candidate	Votes	%	±%
PS	Patrick Bloche	25,894	55.06%	
UMP	Claude-Annick Tissot	9,315	19.81%	
MoDem	Olivier Pages	4,067	8.65%	
LV	Khedidja Bourcart	3,726	7.92%	
LCR	Cécile Silhouette	2,270	4.83%	
FN	Marie d'Herbais	1,357	2.89%	
LO	Jean-Louis Gaillard	402	0.85%	
Turnout		47,031		
PS gain from MRC		Swing		

=== 12th Arrondissement ===
Municipal election 2008: 12th Arrondissement
Party	Candidate	Votes	%	±%
PS	Michèle Blumenthal	24,486	46.07%	
NM	Jean-Marie Cavada	12,922	24.31%	
MoDem	Corinne Lepage	5,287	9.95%	
DVD	Jean-François Pernin	3,452	6.50%	
LV	Christophe Najdovski	3,125	5.88%	
FN	Philippe Coulnecheff	1,550	2.92%	
LCR	Manuele Perez	1,511	2.84%	
Workers' Party	Marie-Paul Lemonnier	510	0.96%	
LO	Georges Millot	303	0.57%	
Turnout		53,146		
PS	Michèle Blumenthal	32,526	64.77%	
UMP	Jean-Marie Cavada	17,692	35.23%	
Turnout		50,218		
PS hold		Swing		

=== 13th Arrondissement ===
Municipal election 2008: 13th Arrondissement
Party	Candidate	Votes	%	±%
PS	Jérôme Coumet	29,324	49.84%	
UMP	Véronique Vasseur	12,559	21.35%	
MoDem	Eric Azière	5,320	9.04%	
LV	Yves Contassot	3,808	6.47%	
LCR	Natacha Larchet	2,240	3.81%	
FN	Monique Raison	1,989	3.38%	
Far left	Jean-François Pellissier	1,403	2.38%	
Independent	Félix Wu	1,229	2.09%	
Workers' Party	Daniel Schapira	629	1.07%	
LO	Jean-Paul Ajzenberg	336	0.57%	
Turnout		58,837		
PS	Jérôme Coumet	39,382	69.88%	
UMP	Véronique Vasseur	16,975	30.12%	
Turnout		56,357		
PS hold		Swing		

=== 14th Arrondissement ===
Municipal election 2008: 14th Arrondissement
Party	Candidate	Votes	%	±%
PS	Pierre Castagnou	21,699	45.03%	
UMP	Marie-Claire Carrère-Gée	10,031	20.81%	
MoDem	Marielle de Sarnez	6,711	13.93%	
LV	René Dutrey	3,871	8.03%	
FN	Élisabeth Baston	1,457	3.02%	
NM	Pierre Vallet	1,434	2.98%	
LCR	Marc Lagoutte	1,345	2.79%	
DVD	Dominique Mahe	776	1.61%	
Independent	Patrice Maire	408	0.85%	
LO	Laurent Vinciguerra	270	0.56%	
Workers' Party	Jean-Pierre Daymard	191	0.40%	
Turnout		48,193		
PS	Pierre Castagnou	27,235	57.37%	
UMP	Marie-Claire Carrère-Gée	13,334	28.09%	
MoDem	Marielle de Sarnez	6,903	14.54%	
Turnout		47,472		
PS hold		Swing		

=== 15th Arrondissement ===
Municipal election 2008: 15th Arrondissement
Party	Candidate	Votes	%	±%
PS	Anne Hidalgo	28,313	35.87%	
UMP	Philippe Goujon	26,794	33.94%	
DVD	Gérard d'Aboville	7,980	10.11%	
MoDem	Elisabeth de Fresquet	5,885	7.45%	
LV	Barbara Pompili	3,157	4.00%	
DVD	Dominique Baud	2,685	3.40%	
FN	Philippe Herlin	2,364	2.99%	
LCR	Marc Lagoutte	1,764	2.44%	
Turnout		79,829		
UMP	Philippe Goujon	42,794	52.65%	
PS	Anne Hidalgo	38,479	47.35%	
Turnout		82,948		
UMP hold		Swing		

=== 16th Arrondissement ===
Municipal election 2008: 16th Arrondissement
Party	Candidate	Votes	%	±%
UMP	Claude Goasguen	23,768	51.71%	
PS	Jean-Yves Mano	7,851	17.08%	
DVD	David Alphand	6,075	13.22%	
MoDem	Jean Peyrelevade	3,972	8.64%	
FN	Martine Lehideux	1,678	3.65%	
DVD	Claude Fain	1,510	3.28%	
LV	Pascale Ourbih	1,114	2.42%	
Turnout		46,491		
UMP hold		Swing		

=== 17th Arrondissement ===
Municipal election 2008: 17th Arrondissement
Party	Candidate	Votes	%	±%
UMP	Françoise de Panafieu	22,002	44.03%	
PS	Annick Lepetit	18,089	36.20%	
MoDem	Pierre-Emmanuel Portheret	4,935	9.88%	
LV	Xavier Knowles	2,279	4.56%	
FN	Martial Bild	2,092	4.19%	
LO	Annick Marty	568	1.14%	
Turnout		50,829		
UMP	Françoise de Panafieu	25,698	52.75%	
PS	Annick Lepetit	23,022	47.25%	
Turnout		50,236		
UMP hold		Swing		

=== 18th Arrondissement ===
Municipal election 2008: 18th Arrondissement
Party	Candidate	Votes	%	±%
PS	Daniel Vaillant	25,791	49.56%	
UMP	Roxane Decorte	9,483	18.22%	
LV	Sylvain Garel	5,392	10.36%	
MoDem	Syrine Catahier	3,482	6.69%	
LCR	Anne Leclerc	2,722	5.23%	
FN	Cyril Bozonnet	1,823	3.50%	
DVD	Michel Langlois	1,685	3.24%	
NM	David Pierre-Bloch	525	1.03%	
LO	Nadine Pinochet	384	0.74%	
Independent	Sauveur Boukris	313	0.60%	
Independent	Lucien Chebib	238	0.46%	
Workers' Party	Alain Cure	196	0.38%	
Turnout		52,844		
PS	Daniel Vaillant	35,861	72.50%	
UMP	Roxane Decorte	13,604	27.50%	
Turnout		51,059		
PS hold		Swing		

=== 19th Arrondissement ===
Municipal election 2008: 19th Arrondissement
Party	Candidate	Votes	%	±%
PS	Roger Madec	24,744	52.14%	
UMP	Jean-Jacques Giannesini	10,130	21.34%	
LV	Bernard Jomier	3,963	8.35%	
MoDem	Violette Baranda	3,238	6.82%	
LCR	Liliane Guardiola	1,867	3.93%	
FN	Roland Curtet	1,725	3.63%	
DVG	Ludovic Moulonguet	688	1.45%	
LO	Marina Podgorny	534	1.13%	
Workers' Party	Luc Beranger	309	0.65%	
DVD	Philippe Herzog	262	0.55%	
Turnout		48,238		
PS hold		Swing		

=== 20th Arrondissement ===
Municipal election 2008: 20th Arrondissement
Party	Candidate	Votes	%	±%
PS	Frédérique Calandra	21,568	38.32%	
DVG	Michel Charzat	9,022	16.03%	
LV	Denis Baupin	5,329	9.47%	
DVD	Raoul Delamare	5,231	9.29%	
MoDem	Didier Bariani	4,114	7.31%	
UMP	Jean-Claude Beaujour	4,076	7.24%	
LCR	Pénélope Duggan	2,767	4.92%	
FN	Tanguy Deshayes	2,033	3.61%	
Far left	Antonietta Marruchelli-Fernanda	1,229	2.18%	
LO	Laurence Boulinier	486	0.86%	
Workers' Party	Benny Malapa	294	0.52%	
Independent	Jean-Marie Badros	136	0.24%	
Turnout		57,213		
PS	Frédérique Calandra	31,984	69.50%	
DVG	Michel Charzat	14,034	30.50%	
Turnout		50,311		
PS gain from DVG		Swing		

== See also ==
- 2008 French municipal elections
- 2008 Marseille municipal election
