= 2001 Paris municipal election =

Local election in France

- 11 and 18 March 2001

All 163 members of the Council of Paris 82 seats needed for a majority
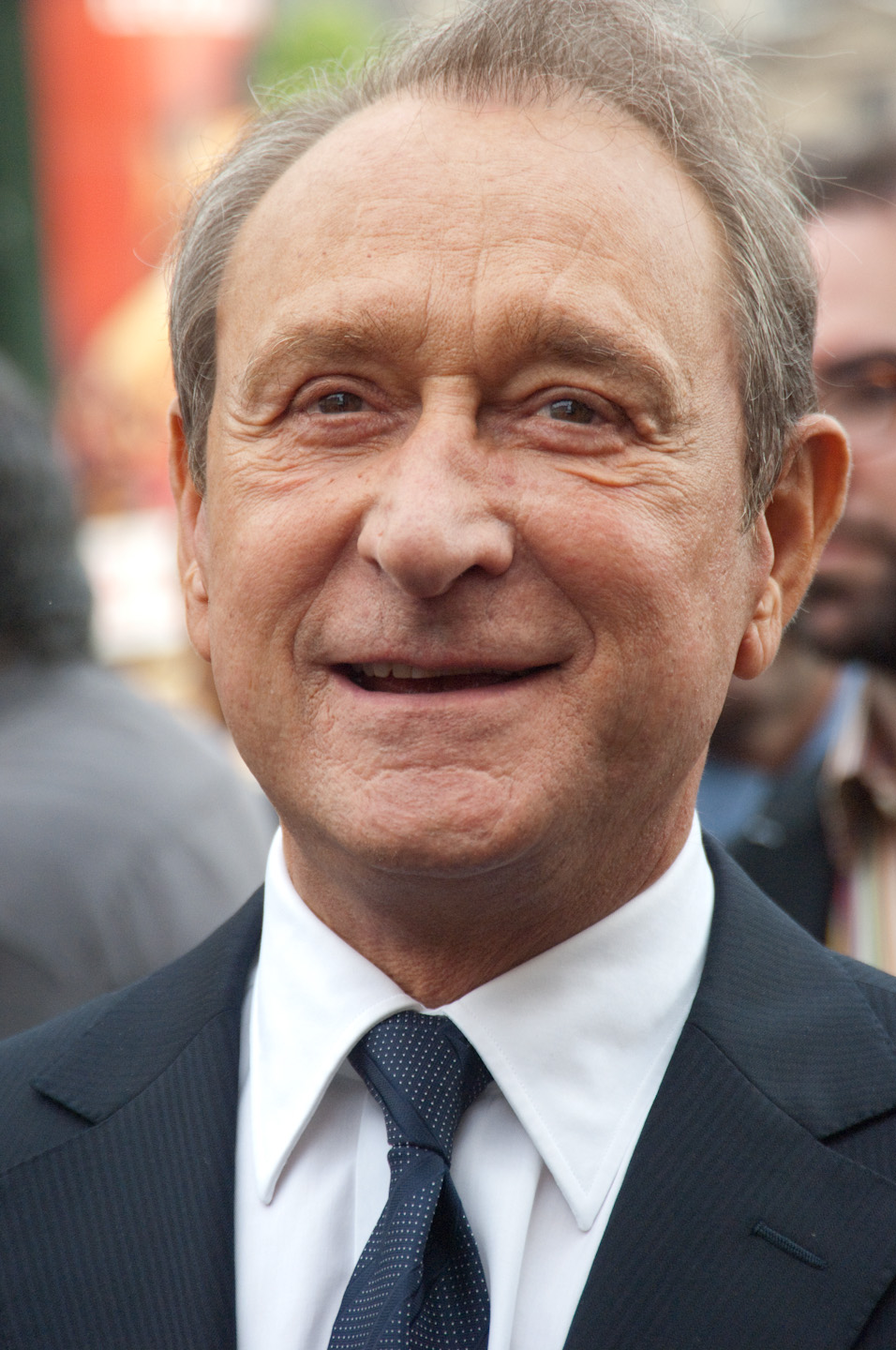

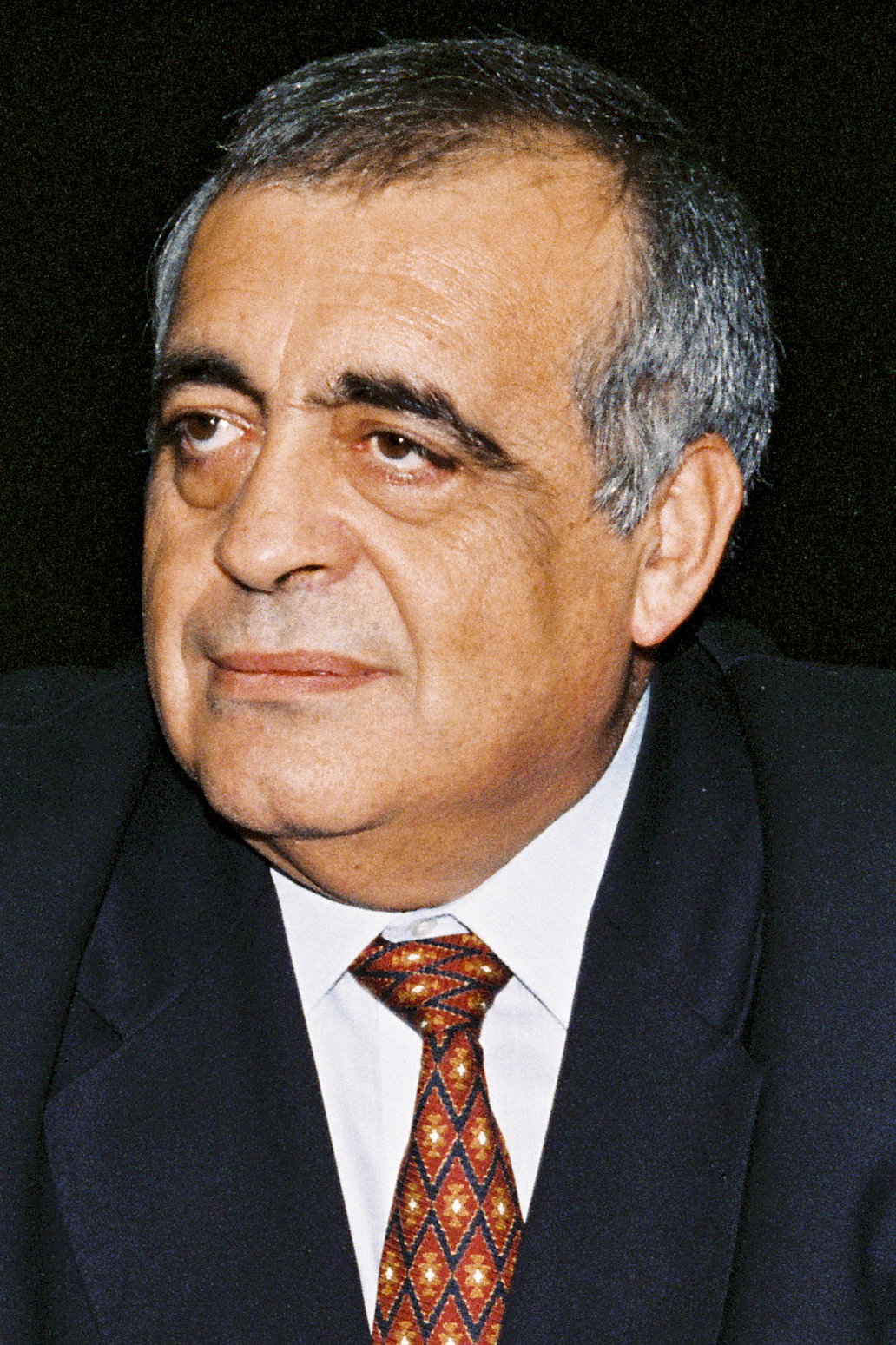

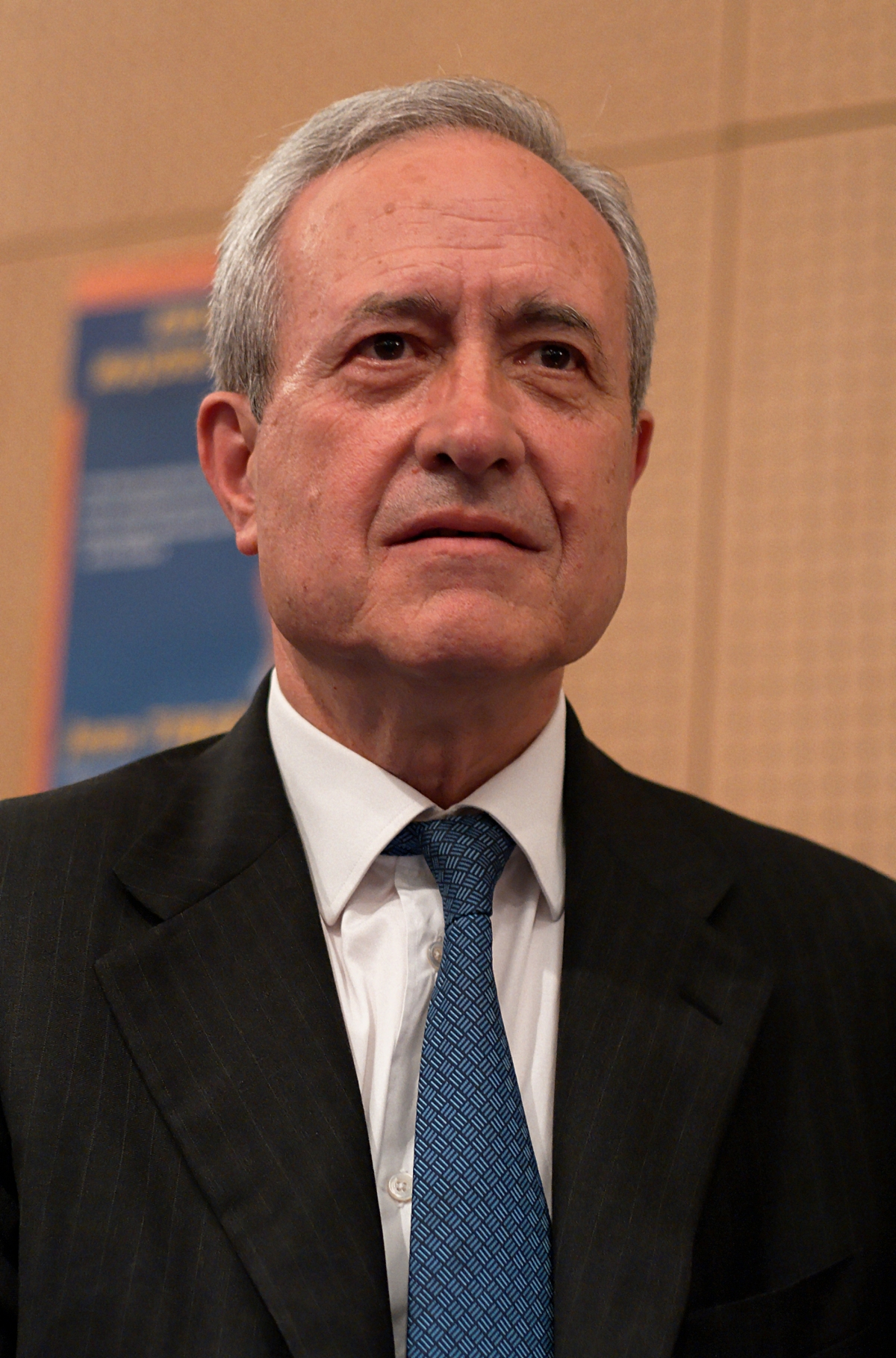

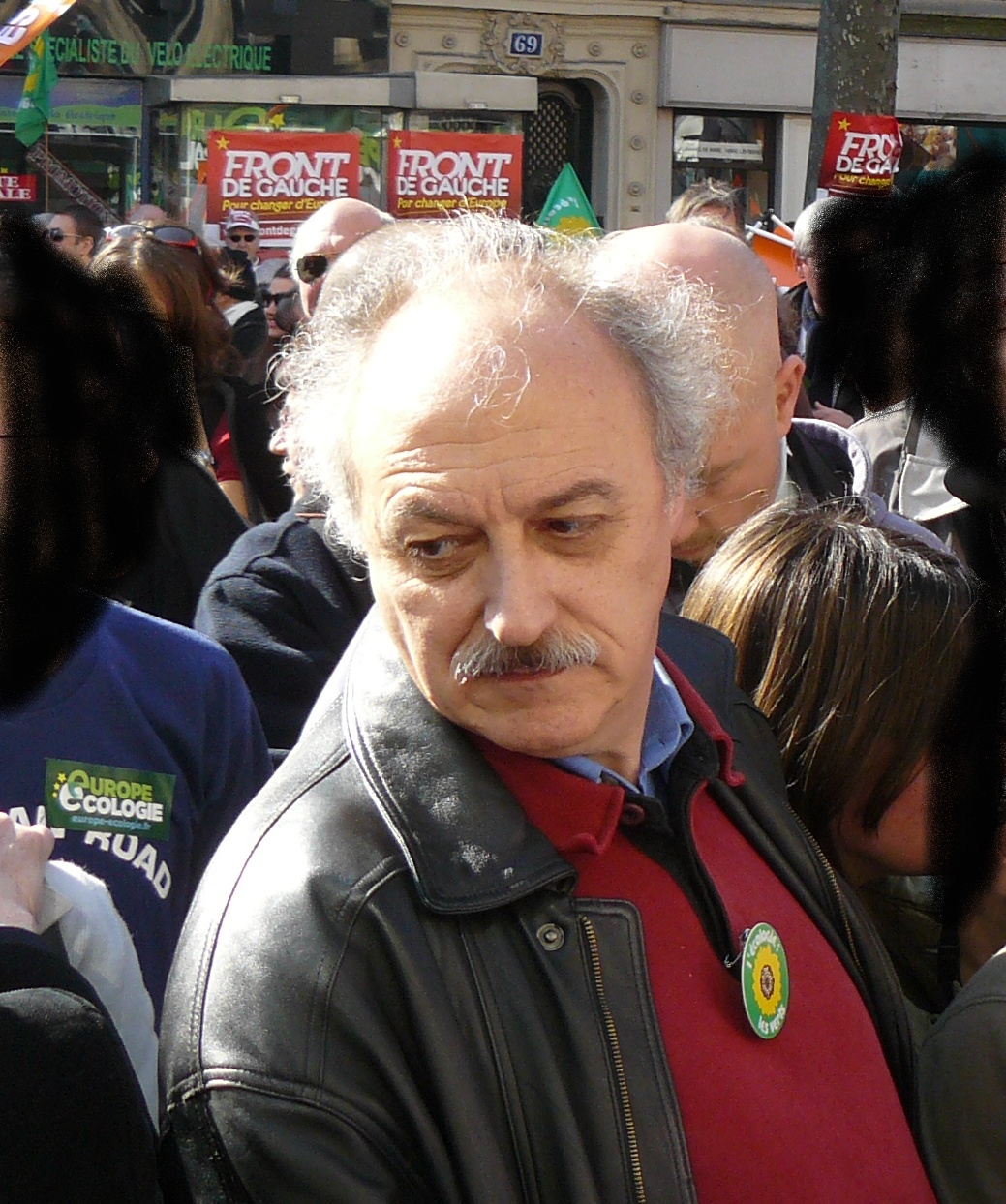
	Majority party	Minority party
Leader	Bertrand Delanoë	Philippe Séguin
Party	PS	RPR
Leader's seat	18th Arrondissement	Did not stand
Last election	46.46%, 58 seats	36.17%, 99 seats
Seats won	69	56
Seat change	▲12	▼43
Popular vote	298 899	228,273
Percentage	49.60%	36.07%
	Third party	Fourth party
Leader	Jean Tiberi	Yves Contassot
Party	RPR dissenters	The Greens
Leader's seat	Did not stand	3rd Arrondissement
Last election	Did not exist	3.77%, 5 seats
Seats won	12	23
Seat change	▲12	▲18
Popular vote	77,715	46,883
Percentage	12.31%	12.35%
- Results of arrondissement mayoral elections
Mayor before election
Jean Tiberi
RPR
Mayor-Elect
Bertrand Delanoë
PS

The 2001 Paris municipal elections were held on 11 and 18 March 2001, alongside many other municipal elections throughout France, to elect the mayor of Paris. Incumbent Mayor Jean Tiberi faced Bertrand Delanoë of the Socialist Party, a Paris councilor and member of the Senate. Tiberi also faced a challenger from the right in Philippe Séguin, the former president of France's National Assembly, due to Tiberi having split off from the RPR to form his own dissident faction within the Council of Paris. Tiberi also faced green city councilor Yves Contassot. Due to the division within the RPR, the center-right vote was split which allowed Delanoë's Socialists to come to power for the first time since an independent Paris mayorship was re-established in 1977.

Control for the mayorships of Paris's 20 arrondissements was also in play. The Socialist Party won 11 arrondissement mayorships, the two RPR factions together eight, and The Greens one.

== Candidates ==
- Yves Contassot (LV), Paris councilor
- Bertrand Delanoë (PS), Paris councilor, member of the Senate and former member of the National Assembly
- Philippe Séguin (RPR), member and former president of the National Assembly
- Jean Tiberi (RPR), incumbent mayor and member of the National Assembly

== General results ==
=== Elected mayors ===
Arrondissement	Incumbent mayor	Party	Elected mayor	Party
Paris	Jean Tiberi	RPR	Bertrand Delanoë	PS
1st	Jean-François Legaret	RPR	Jean-François Legaret	RPR
2nd	Benoîte Taffin	DVD	Jacques Boutault	The Greens
3rd	Pierre Aidenbaum	PS	Pierre Aidenbaum	PS
4th	Lucien Finel	UDF	Dominique Bertinotti	PS
5th	Jean-Charles Bardon	RPR	Jean Tiberi	RPR
6th	Jean-Pierre Lecoq	RPR	Jean-Pierre Lecoq	RPR
7th	Martine Aurillac	RPR	Martine Aurillac	RPR
8th	François Lebel	RPR	François Lebel	RPR
9th	Gabriel Kaspereit	RPR	Jacques Bravo	PS
10th	Tony Dreyfus	PS	Tony Dreyfus	PS
11th	Georges Sarre	MDC	Georges Sarre	MDC
12th	Jean-François Pernin	UDF	Michèle Blumenthal	PS
13th	Jacques Toubon	RPR	Serge Blisko	PS
14th	Lionel Assouad	RPR	Pierre Castagnou	PS
15th	René Galy-Dejean	RPR	René Galy-Dejean	RPR
16th	Pierre-Christian Taittinger	DL	Pierre-Christian Taittinger	DL
17th	Pierre Rémond	RPR	Françoise de Panafieu	RPR
18th	Daniel Vaillant	PS	Annick Lepetit	PS
19th	Roger Madec	PS	Roger Madec	PS
20th	Michel Charzat	PS	Michel Charzat	PS

== See also ==
- 2001 French municipal elections
