= Appeal of Montpellier =

The Appeal of Montpellier (French: L'appel de Montpellier) is a political manifesto of French politicians formed in November 2009 in support of same-sex marriage in France.

== Signatories ==
- Hélène Mandroux, mayor of Montpellier
- Patrick Bloche, mayor of the 11th arrondissement of Paris, member of the National Assembly for the 7th constituency of Paris
- Joaquim Pueyo, mayor of Alençon
- Laure Dael, mayor of Andelys
- Jean-Claude Antonini, mayor of Angers
- Annonay, Olivier Dussopt
- Bègles, Noël Mamere
- Carrière-sous-Poissy, Eddie Ait
- Dieppe, Sébastien Jumel
- Dieulefit, Christine Priotto
- La Ferté Saint Aubin, Philippe Froment
- Marc Vuillemot La Seyne-sur-Mer
- Maud Olivier, mayor of Les Ulis
- Martine Aubry, mayor of Lille
- Nathalie Perrin-Gilbert, NA deputy for 1st arrondissement of Lyon
- Lyon 3rd, Thierry Philip
- Lyon 4ème, Dominique Bolliet
- Lyon 5ème, Alexandrine Pesson
- Lyon 7ème, Jean-Pierre Flaconneche
- Lyon 8ème, Christian Coulon
- Lyon 9ème, Alain Giordano
- Mareau aux Près, Bertrand Hauchecorne
- Moëlan-sur-Mer, Nicolas Morvan
- Montreuil, Dominique Voynet
- Palaiseau, François Lamy
- Paris 10ème, Rémy Feraud
- Paris 19ème, Roger Madec
- Paris 2ème, Jacques Boutault
- Paris 4ème, Dominique Bertinotti
- Paris 9ème, Jacques Bravo
- Paris, Bertrand Delanoë
- Poissy, Frédérik Bernard
- Reims, Adeline Hazan
- Rennes, Daniel Delaveau
- Rouen, Valérie Fourneyron
- Saint-Amans-Roche-Savine, André Chassaigne
- Tomblaine (Gd Nancy), Hervé Feron
- Villeurbanne, Jean-Louis Bret
- Chalon sur Saône, Christophe Sirugue
- Conflans Ste Honorine, Philippe Esnol
- Grabels, René Revol
- Malakoff, Catherine Margate
- Salon-de-Provence, Michel Tonon
- Toulouse, Pierre Cohen
- Unieux, Christophe Faverjon

== Observers ==
- Jordi Hereu, Mayor of Barcelona
- Martine Martinel (Député Haute Garonne)
- Jean-Charles Taddei, Human Rights League
- Hussein Bourgi, Collective Against Homophobia
- Le Refuge
- Lesbian & Gay Pride
- Arc en Ciel
- Marie-George Buffet
- Cécile Duflot
- Jean-Louis Touraine, deputy, 2nd deputy mayor of Lyon.
