= Paris's 13th constituency =

Constituency of the National Assembly of France

13th constituency of Paris
- inline Constituency of the National Assembly of France

- Paris, showing its post 2012 legislative constituencies
- Deputy: David Amiel; RE
- Department: Paris
- Registered voters: 75,382

The 13th constituency of Paris (French: Treizième circonscription de Paris) is a French legislative constituency in the Paris département (75). Like the other 576 French constituencies, it elects one MP using the two-round system. Its boundaries were heavily redrawn in 1988 and 2012.

13th constituency of Paris
- inline Constituency of the National Assembly of France

- Paris, showing its legislative constituencies between 1988 and 2012
- Member: constituency abolished, 2012
- Department: Paris

Map of Paris constituencies in 1981.

== Historic representation ==
Election	Member	Party	Source
1958	René Sanson	UNR	
1962	René Sanson	UNR	
1967	Pierre Cot	UP	
1968	Henri Modiano	UDR	
1973	Gisèle Moreau	PCF	
1978	Gisèle Moreau	PCF	
1981	Nicole Questiaux	PS	
1981	Louis Moulinet	PS	
1986	Proportional representation - no election by constituency		
1988	Michèle Barzach	RPR	
1991	René Galy-Dejean	RPR	
1993	René Galy-Dejean	RPR	
1997	René Galy-Dejean	RPR	
2002	René Galy-Dejean	UMP	
2007	Jean-François Lamour	UMP	
2012	Jean-François Lamour	UMP	
2017	Hugues Renson	LREM	
2022	David Amiel	RE	
2024	David Amiel	RE	

== Election results ==
=== 2024 ===
Candidate	Party	Alliance	First round			Second round		
Candidate	Party	Alliance	Votes	%	+/–	Votes	%	+/–
David Amiel	RE	ENS	21,698	38.85	+0.78	27,970	55.76	-4.10
Aminata Niakaté	LÉ	NFP	20,722	37.11	+6.56	22,192	44.24	+4.10
Sophie Rostan	RN		7,818	14.00	+9.04			
Frédéric Jacquot	DVD		3,419	6.12	N/A			
Victor Chrzanowski	REC		824	1.48	-5.61			
Ingrid Allorant	DVE		811	1.45	N/A			
Annie Poupon	DVC		234	0.42	N/A			
Corinne Roethlisberger	LO		226	0.40	-0.07			
Anne-Laure Delinot	DIV		85	0.15	N/A			
Corinne Paine	DLF		7	0.01	N/A			
Francis Sando	DIV		1	0.00	N/A			
Anne Oudiou	EXG		0	0.00	N/A			
Valid votes			55,845	98.68	+0.17	50,162	94.44	-0.17
Blank votes			515	0.91	-0.23	2,186	4.12	+0.06
Null votes			233	0.41	+0.06	765	1.44	+0.11
Turnout			56,593	72.79	+17.32	53,113	68.31	+14.15
Abstentions			21,158	27.21	-17.32	24,638	31.69	-14.15
Registered voters			77,751			77,751		
Source: Ministry of the Interior, Le Monde
Result						RE HOLD		

=== 2022 ===
Legislative Election 2022: Paris's 13th constituency
Party	Candidate	Votes	%	±%
LREM (Ensemble)	David Amiel	16,267	38.07	-5.51
EELV (NUPÉS)	Aminata Niakate	13,053	30.55	+12.43
LC (UDC)	Nicolas Jeannete	5,990	14.02	−14.06
REC	Ornella Evangelista	3,031	7.09	N/A
RN	Isabelle Bolvin	2,119	4.96	+1.66
Others	N/A	2,267		
Turnout		43,374	55.47	−4.31
2nd round result
LREM (Ensemble)	David Amiel	23,982	59.86	+3.87
EELV (NUPÉS)	Aminata Niakate	16,081	40.14	N/A
Turnout		40,063	54.16	+2.83
LREM hold				

=== 2017 ===
Legislative Election 2017: Paris's 13th constituency
Party	Candidate	Votes	%	±%
LREM	Hugues Renson	19,452	43.58	N/A
LR	Jean-François Lamour	12,533	28.08	−15.79
LFI	Magalhy Berto	3,277	7.34	N/A
PS	Naza Chiffert	3,232	7.24	N/A
EELV	Thibault Brage	1,581	3.54	−0.14
FN	Wallerand De Saint Just	1,472	3.30	−1.99
Others	N/A	3,090		
Turnout		45,069	59.78	−2.79
2nd round result
LREM	Hugues Renson	20,239	55.99	N/A
LR	Jean-François Lamour	15,906	44.01	−10.59
Turnout		38,846	51.33	−9.14
LREM gain from LR		Swing		

=== 2012 ===
Legislative Election 2012: Paris's 13th constituency
Party	Candidate	Votes	%	±%
UMP	Jean-François Lamour	19,927	43.87	+7.28
PRG	Gilles Alayrac	15,602	34.35	N/A
FN	Olivier Cornu	2,402	5.29	+2.77
FG	Véronique Sandoval	1,809	3.98	N/A
MoDem	Delphine Girard	1,732	3.81	−6.34
EELV	Jean Lafont	1,673	3.68	+1.39
Others	N/A	2,282		
Turnout		45,427	62.57	−2.90
2nd round result
UMP	Jean-François Lamour	23,964	54.60	−2.14
PRG	Gilles Alayrac	19,927	45.40	N/A
Turnout		43,891	60.47	+0.19
UMP hold				

=== 2007 ===
Elections between 1988 and 2007 were based on the 1988 boundaries.

Map of Paris Constituencies, 1988-2007 elections

Legislative Election 2007: Paris's 13th constituency
Party	Candidate	Votes	%	±%
UMP	Jean-François Lamour	16,866	36.59	
PS	Anne Hidalgo	13,004	28.21	
DVD	René Galy-Dejean	5,275	11.44	
MoDem	Michel Bulte	4,679	10.15	
DVD	Dominique Baud	1,504	3.26	
FN	Elisabeth Baston	1,161	2.52	
LV	Barbara Pompili	1,055	2.29	
Others	N/A	2,556		
Turnout		46,388	65.47	
2nd round result
UMP	Jean-François Lamour	23,705	56.74	
PS	Anne Hidalgo	18,071	43.26	
Turnout		42,710	60.28	
UMP hold				

=== 2002 ===
Legislative Election 2002: Paris's 13th constituency
Party	Candidate	Votes	%	±%
UMP	René Galy-Dejean	23,830	53.26	
PRG	Gilles Alayrac	12,209	27.29	
FN	Elisabeth Baston	2,783	6.22	
LV	Paulette Frantz Janey	1,191	2.66	
Others	N/A	4,727		
Turnout		45,192	70.69	
UMP hold				

=== 1997 ===
Legislative Election 1997: Paris's 13th constituency
Party	Candidate	Votes	%	±%
RPR	René Galy-Dejean	18,452	45.33	
PRG	Gilles Alayrac	8,217	20.18	
FN	Georges Péan	4,106	10.09	
PCF	Raymonde Contensous	1,761	4.33	
LV	Joël Chenais	1,415	3.48	
MEI	Laure Schneiter	1,298	3.19	
DVD	Nicolas Gandy	1,222	3.00	
LO	Claire Maury	918	2.25	
Others	N/A	3,321		
Turnout		41,897	62.92	
2nd round result
RPR	René Galy-Dejean	25,588	61.74	
PRG	Gilles Alayrac	15,856	38.26	
Turnout		43,057	64.67	
RPR hold				
