= Bidault =

Bidault is a surname. Notable people with the surname include:

- Georges Bidault (1899–1983), French politician
- Marcel-Ernest Bidault (born 1938), French cyclist
- Raphaële Bidault-Waddington (born 1971), French artist-researcher
