= Michèle Barzach =

French politician (1943–2026)

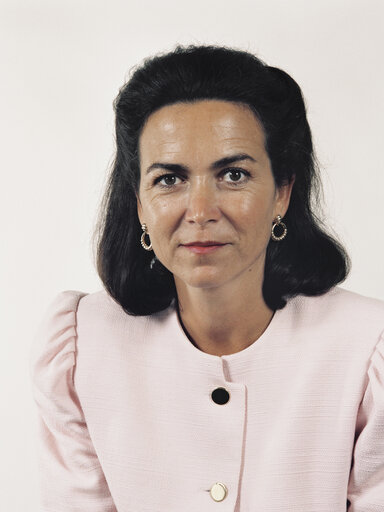
- Michèle Barzach in 1989

Deputy to the National Assembly of France
- In office 23 June 1988 – 6 December 1990
- President: François Mitterrand
- Preceded by: constituency established
- Succeeded by: René Galy-Dejean
- Parliamentary group: Groupe Rassemblement pour la République
- Constituency: Thirteenth constituency of Paris, 1988–2012

French Minister for Health and Family
- In office 25 March 1986 – 10 May 1988
- President: François Mitterrand

Personal details
- Born: 11 July 1943 Casablanca, French protectorate in Morocco
- Died: 26 October 2026 (aged 83) Paris, France
- Party: Rassemblement pour la République (RPR)
- Other political affiliations: Union for a Popular Movement
- Spouse: Jacques Lebas (1949–2019)
- Education: University of Paris
- Profession: Gynaecologist; Psychoanalyst
- Awards: Officière de la Légion d'honneur

Michèle Barzach (11 July 1943 – 26 October 2026) was a French politician, gynaecologist, and psychoanalyst. She was Minister of Health and Family in Jacques Chirac's second government from 1986 to 1988. As minister she implemented policies in response to the AIDS pandemic. She was also chairwoman of UNICEF France from 2012 to 2015.

== Biography ==
=== Background and education ===
Barzach was born on 11 July 1943 in Casablanca, into a North African Jewish family. Barzach attended secondary school in Casablanca, Morocco, and then later pursued studies in medicine at the University of Paris Faculty of Medicine. From 1970 to 1986, she was a gynaecologist and a psychoanalyst in Paris.

=== Political career ===
Barzach campaigned for ten years in the Rassemblement pour la République while being mentored by mayor of the 13th arrondissement Jacques Toubon.

==== 1986–1988: Health Minister ====
Barzach became Minister of Health and Family in 1986, after having been named by Jacques Chirac. In practice, she was minister-delegate under Minister of Social Affairs Philippe Séguin's authority. She occupied the post from 25 March 1986 to 10 May 1988.

On 6 May 1986, which was one week after the Chernobyl disaster and the consequent drifting of a radioactive cloud over France and the Low Countries, Barzach, the then Minister of Health, acting as the government's spokeswoman, stated that this cloud had not contaminated France, and that there was no particular precaution that needed to be taken that was tied to public health.

With a view to enhancing safety in childbirth, Barzach set forth a process for consolidating maternity facilities in a circulaire signed in 1988.

===== HIV/AIDS =====
Barzach was considered the first minister in the world to become aware of the need to set out a public policy to deal with HIV/AIDS, and the first to take concrete measures on the issue. This placed her in opposition to most members in her political camp, she wished to promote the only means of guarding against contamination by human immunodeficiency viruses: the condom. She thus needed to have a new law enacted. Indeed, condom advertisements had long been forbidden in France, as condoms had always been regarded as a kind of contraceptive. Once the law had been voted into force, she launched an information campaign about condoms and had television advertising for them authorized.

Barzach signed a decree authorizing the free sale of hypodermic syringes at pharmacies, a measure that sought to limit intravenous substance abusers' exposure to various viruses, foremost among these being HIV and the hepatitis C virus, which would mark the beginning of a risk-reduction policy in these matters, contrary to the 1970 law on drugs.

=== Political career after 1988 ===
In 1988, Barzach was elected deputy in Paris, and then assistant to the mayor of Paris Jacques Chirac in 1989, and then later Member of the European Parliament. In 1989, a group called "Rénovateurs" formed, of which Barach was associated, which sought to unite the UDF and the RPR at Michel Noir's and François Léotard's behest. Jacques Chirac, to whom she was quite close, saw this as treachery, and Barzach was thus excluded from party administration after having been a candidate for the RPR's administrative committee. She furthermore lost both her function as mayoral assistant and her mandate as deputy. She failed to get herself elected at the 1992 French regional elections in Orléans, losing to Antoine Carré.

=== International career ===
==== UNICEF ====
Barzach was a member of the administrative council of the association "Friends of the Global Fund Europe" (Amis du fonds mondial Europe), after having been the chairwoman from 2005 until 2013, which seeks to promote actions by the Global Fund in the fight against AIDS, tuberculosis, and malaria.

On 5 June 2012, she was elected as head of UNICEF France, a post that she held until 23 June 2015.

== Implication in the Matzneff affair ==
On 31 March 2020, The New York Times reported remarks made by one of French pedophile Gabriel Matzneff's victims, Francesca Gee, three months after Vanessa Springora's book Le Consentement ("Consent") was released. Michèle Barzach is mentioned in the book as having been the gynaecologist to whose practice Matzneff brought his young victims to obtain prescriptions for contraceptive pills, and this at a time when the law forbade minors such prescriptions without their parents' approval. Moreover, in Élie et Phaéton ("Elijah and Phaethon"), Matzneff cites the gynaecologist's name, saying that she never believed at any time that she needed to morally lecture either this 37-year-old gentleman or his 15-year-old mistress. She was questioned about this on 2 March and 28 April 2020 by police officers from the Office central pour la répression des violences aux personnes (OCRVP) at Nanterre.

== Death ==
Barzach died of a stroke on 26 October 2026, at the age of 83. The French organisation AIDES paid tribute praising her "political courage in the face of AIDS".

== Award ==
Barzach was decorated in 2008 by then President Nicolas Sarkozy, becoming an Officer (Officière) of the Legion of Honour; the ceremony took place on 14 July that year – Bastille Day.

== Publications ==
- Je t'aime, Je ne t'aime pas (créativité, spontanéité et poésie collective), avec G.C. Rapaille Paris, éditions Universitaires, 1974.
- Le Paravent des égoïsmes, Odile Jacob, 1989.
- Vérités et tabous, Éditions du Seuil, 1994.
