= Gisèle Moreau =

French politician

- Gisèle Moreau in 1994

Member of the European Parliament
- In office 19 July 1994 – 19 July 1999
- Parliamentary group: GUE (1994-1995); GUE/NGL (1995-1999)
- Constituency: France

Member of the Council of Paris
- In office 13 March 1983 – 18 March 2001

Member of the French Parliament
- In office 11 March 1973 – 22 May 1981
- Preceded by: Henri Modiano
- Succeeded by: Nicole Questiaux
- Constituency: Paris's 13th constituency

Conseillère de Paris
- In office 13 March 1983 – 18 March 2001

Secretary of the National Assembly
- In office 2 April 1976 – 2 April 1977

Personal details
- Born: Gisèle Marie Hélène Haillot; 30 June 1941 (age 85) Paris, France
- Party: French Communist Party

Gisèle Marie Hélène Moreau (née Haillot; born 30 June 1941) is a French politician. A member of the French Communist Party, she was a member of the National Assembly for the Paris's 13th constituency, and then a member of the European Parliament.

== Biography ==
Moreau was born in 1941 in the 18th arrondissement of Paris. She is the daughter of a pastry chef and left high school after the fourth year to work. She joined the French Communist Party (PCF), then the Union of Young Women of France (UJFF) in 1958.

In 1962 she married Michel Moreau, an accountant at the company where she worked, an activist in the General Confederation of Labour (CGT) and the PCF, with whom she had two daughters.

Gisèle Moreau was a member of parliament for Paris from 1973 to 1981, serving on the Social Affairs Committee. She was secretary of the National Assembly from 2 April 1976 to 2 April 1976 and was part of the bureau of the communist parliamentary group from April 1978 to April 1980.

She was elected three times in a row to the Council of Paris from 1983 to 2001.

During her term as a Member of the European Parliament from 1994 to 1999, she belonged to the Committee on Women's Rights and the Committee on Transport and Tourism.

She was a member of the political bureau and the secretariat of the PCF from 1979 to 1996. She was reappointed in 1982 to the secretariat of the PCF, in charge of women, Gisèle Moreau was the only woman appointed to the leadership structure of the PCF (secretariat composed in 1982 of Georges Marchais, Charles Fiterman, Gaston Plissonnier, Paul Laurent, Jean Colpin and Maxime Gremetz).

Gisèle Moreau is the author of Libres et Égales (1982) and Toujours elles (1990).

== Details of mandates ==
- 2 April 1973 - 2 April 1978: MP for Paris (13th constituency)
- 19 March 1978 - 22 May 1981: MP for Paris (13th constituency)
- 1983 - 1989: conseiller
- 1989 - 1995: conseiller
- 1995 - 2001: conseiller
- 19 July 1994 – 19 July 1999: MEP

== See also ==
- List of members of the European Parliament for France, 1994–1999
