= David Amiel =

French politician (born 1992)

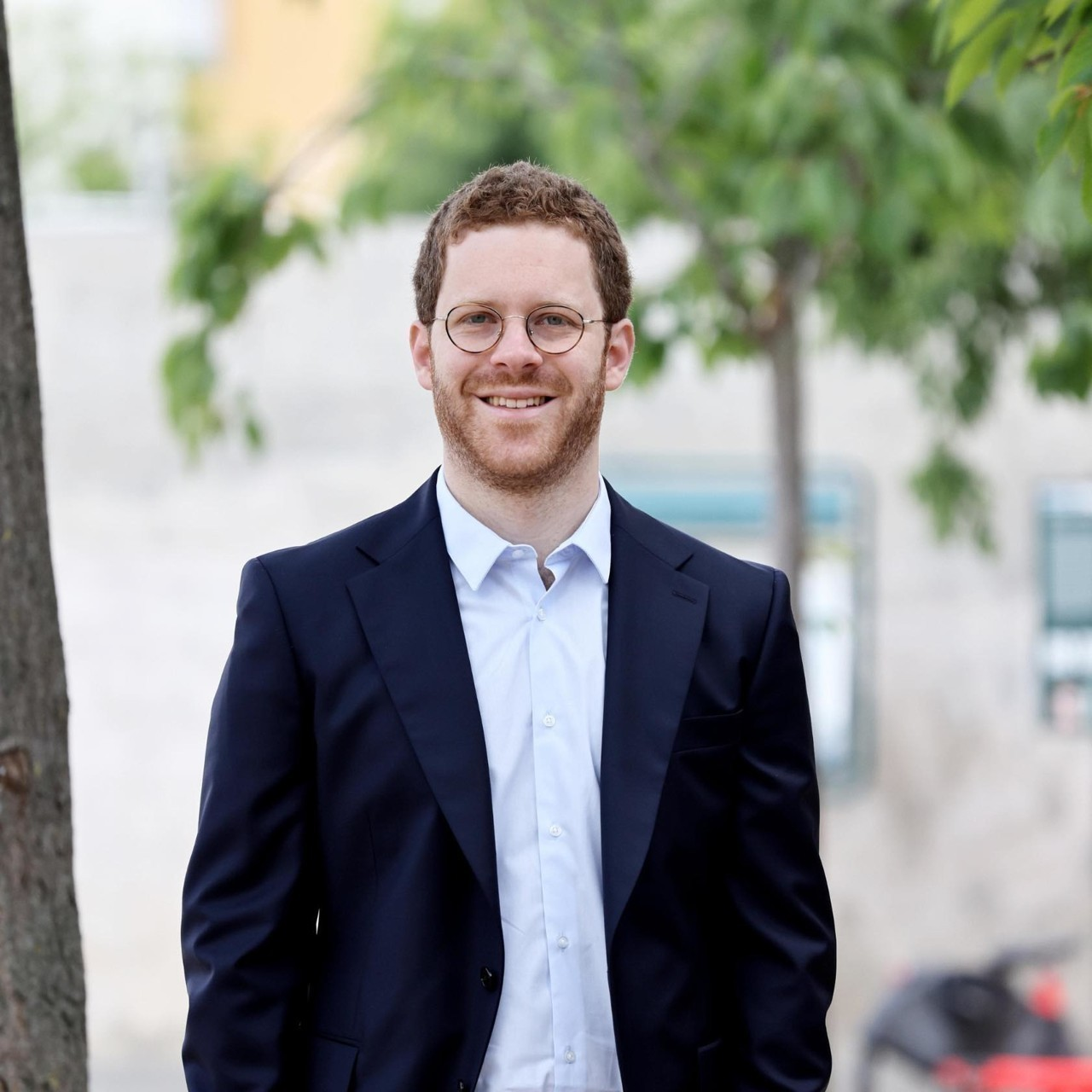

Minister of Public Action and Accounts
- Incumbent
- Assumed office 22 February 2026
- Prime Minister: Sébastien Lecornu
- Preceded by: Amélie de Montchalin

Delegated Minister for the Civil Service and State reform
- In office 12 October 2025 – 22 February 2026
- Prime Minister: Sébastien Lecornu
- Minister: Amélie de Montchalin
- Preceded by: Naïma Moutchou (as a full-fledged Minister)

Member of the National Assembly for Paris's 13th constituency
- Incumbent
- Assumed office 22 June 2022
- Preceded by: Hugues Renson

Personal details
- Born: 28 November 1992 (age 33) Paris, France
- Party: Renaissance
- Education: Lycée Louis-le-Grand; Lycée Henri-IV
- Alma mater: École normale supérieure

David Amiel (French pronunciation: [david amjɛl]; born 28 November 1992) is a French politician of the Renaissance (RE) party who has been serving as the minister of public action and accounts since 2026. He previously served as the Delegated Minister for the Civil Service and State reform in the Second Lecornu government from 2025 to 2026. He previously represented the 13th constituency of Paris in the National Assembly from 2022 to 2025

Throughout his political career, Amiel has been particularly involved in issues related to housing targeted at public sector employees, energy-efficient building renovation, and the criminalization of speech that calls for the "denial of a state" or portrays terrorist acts as "legitimate resistance". He describes Zionism as a "movement of emancipation", referring to Theodor Herzl.

== Early life and education ==
Amiel was born in Paris on 28 November 1992, completed his secondary studies at Lycée Louis-le-Grand. After completing his Baccalauréat, Amiel returned to school, studying at Lycée Henri-IV, where he achieved his hypokhâgne. Amiel graduated from the École normale supérieure in 2011 and later studied at Princeton University, in the United States, where he met Paul Krugman.

== Early career ==
In 2015, Amiel worked as an intern in the office of then-Minister of Finance Emmanuel Macron.

Between May 2017 and March 2019, Amiel was one of President Macron's advisors in the Élysée Palace alongside Alexis Kohler, the President's Secretary-General. Amiel was responsible for coordination between technical advisors in the President's office. Amiel left the President's office to co-write an essay Le progrès ne tombe pas du ciel (English: Progress doesn't fall from the sky) with Ismaël Emelien. The two wrote about the "society of frustration", and the "secession of the popular classes" and that progressivism is the only political response to populism. According to sources close to Macron, the work was meant to serve as an "ideological backbone" to Macronism. The work, which sold 3,700 copies, was received dryly by critics who suggested that it was low on substance in favor of absolute support of the President's actions.

In 2019, Amiel joined the team of Benjamin Griveaux in preparation for the 2020 Paris municipal elections. After the defeat of the Presidential majority in the city, Amiel sat as a member of the opposition in the city council, representing the 15th arrondissement. Amiel opposed the Tour Triangle, campaigned in support of the opening of Rue du Commerce on Sundays and worked on security problems in Beaugrenelle.

At the same time, Amiel began work at La Poste, but left the job after less than a year to join President Macron's re-election campaign in the 2022 presidential election.

== Political career ==
During the 2022 legislative elections, Amiel ran as a candidate in Paris's 13th constituency as a member of the Ensemble ! coalition. A vote leader in the first round, Amiel was elected in the second round over Aminata Niakaté of the NUPES coalition with 59.86% of the vote. He was reelected in the 2024 French legislative election.

Upon his election to Parliament, Amiel became a member of the Finance Committee in the National Assembly.

== Publications ==
With Ismaël Emelien, Le progrès ne tombe pas du ciel, Paris, Fayard, 2019 ISBN 978-2-2137-1274-1.
