= François Missoffe =

French politician and diplomat (1919-2003)

Minister of Youth Affairs and Sports
- In office 1966–1968
- President: Charles de Gaulle
- Prime Minister: Georges Pompidou
- Preceded by: Maurice Herzog
- Succeeded by: Roland Nungesser

Member of the National Assembly for Paris's 24th constituency
- In office 1968–1974
- Preceded by: André Roulland
- Succeeded by: Hélène Missoffe

Personal details
- Born: 13 October 1919 Toulon, France
- Died: 28 August 2003 (aged 83) Rouen, France
- Party: UNR
- Spouse: Hélène de Mitry
- Relatives: Françoise de Panafieu (daughter)

François Missoffe (13 October 1919 – 28 August 2003) was a French politician and diplomat. He was Minister of Youth Affairs and Sport ("Ministre de la Jeunesse et des Sports") in the Government of France between 8 January 1966 and 30 May 1968.

He played a minor role in the run-up to events of May 1968 in France. On 8 January 1968, Missoffe was forced by students at the Paris West University Nanterre La Défense to abandon the inauguration of a campus swimming pool. He was interrupted while making his speech at the occasion by student leader, Daniel Cohn-Bendit in order to demand free access to the girls' dormitory.

Missoffe was Ambassador to Japan from 1964 to 1966.
