= Hugues Renson =

French politician (born 1978)

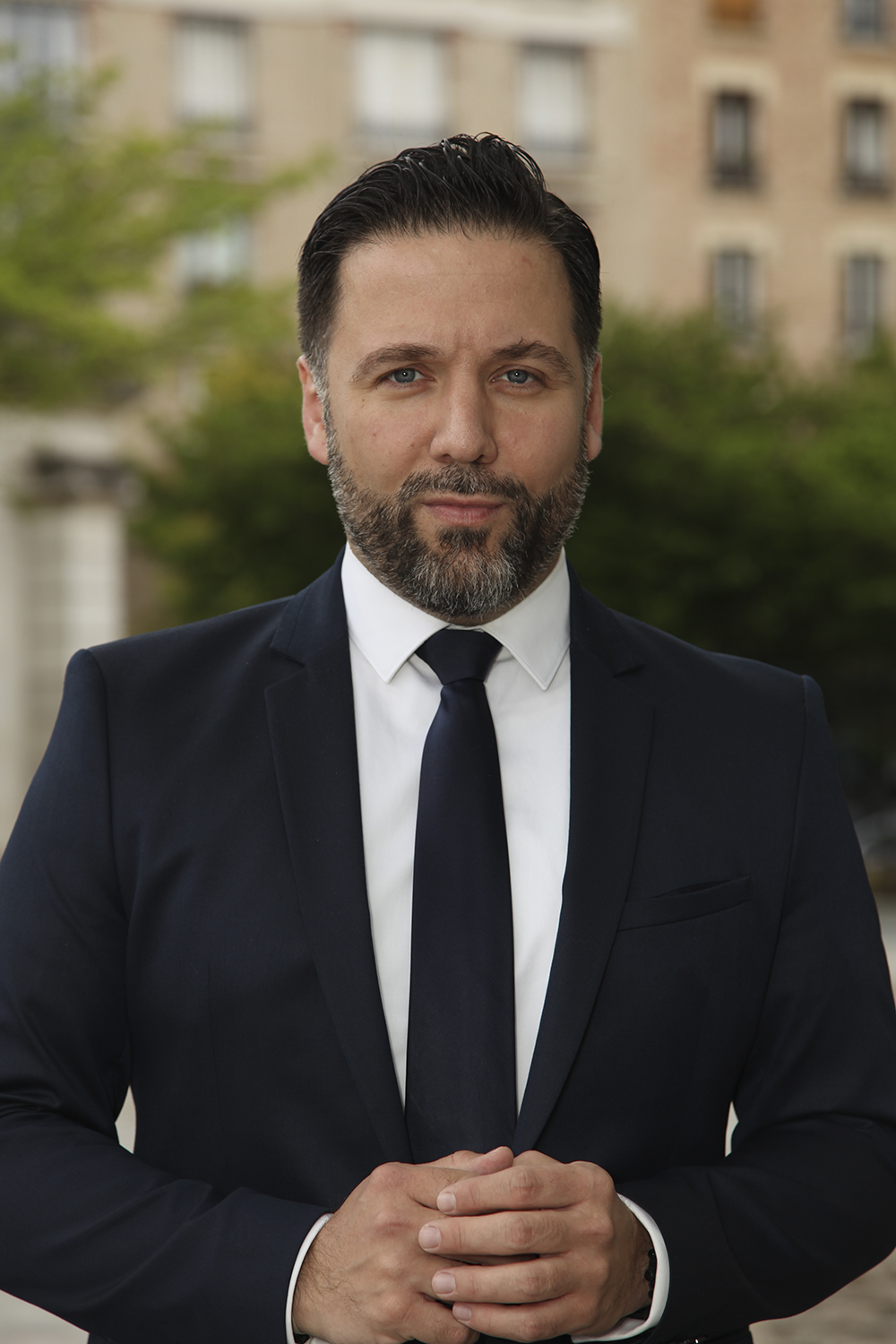

Member of the National Assembly for Paris's 13th constituency
- In office 21 June 2017 – 21 June 2022
- Preceded by: Jean-François Lamour
- Succeeded by: David Amiel

Personal details
- Born: 11 February 1978 (age 48) Paris, France
- Party: Renaissance (2017–present)
- Other political affiliations: United Republic (2010–2012)
- Education: Paris-Panthéon-Assas University; Sciences Po

Hugues Renson (French pronunciation: [yɡ ʁɑ̃sɔ̃]; born 11 February 1978) is a French politician who represented the 13th constituency of Paris in the National Assembly from 2017 to 2022. A member of La République En Marche! (LREM), his constituency encompasses the southern half of the Paris's 15th arrondissement.

== Education and early career ==
Renson, who graduated from Sciences Po in 2001, served as a councillor to President Jacques Chirac (2004–2007), in charge of social affairs.

== Political career ==
In the 2012 presidential election, Renson publicly endorsed the Socialist Party's candidate François Hollande. Similarly, he voted for Socialist candidate Anne Hidalgo, a family friend, in the 2014 Paris municipal election.

In 2017, Renson joined Emmanuel Macron's La République En Marche! party. He was elected to the National Assembly in the legislative election later that year, as the MP for Paris's 13th constituency, defeating incumbent Jean-François Lamour of The Republicans party. He took office on 21 June 2017. Renson was elected a week later by his peers to one of the six vice-presidencies of the National Assembly, a rare occurrence for a new member, a position in which he succeeded David Habib of the Socialist Party. He also serves on the Committee on Foreign Affairs. In addition to his committee assignments, he is a member of the French-Greek Parliamentary Friendship Group and the French-Lebanese Parliamentary Friendship Group.

In late 2018, Renson, Aurélien Taché and Matthieu Orphelin convened a group of around 20 members of the LREM parliamentary group with a "wish to express a humanist, social and ecological sensibility and to better raise citizens' concerns"; the initiative was widely interpreted as the launch of a left-wing faction within the group. In 2020, he joined forces with Barbara Pompili as co-founder of En Commun, a group of centre-left LREM politicians.

Ahead of the 2020 Paris municipal election, Renson failed to win the party nomination for the mayorship against Benjamin Griveaux. He subsequently endorsed Cédric Villani, who also failed to win the nomination but decided to run as an Independent.

In February 2022, Renson announced he would not seek reelection to a second term as an MP. In his announcement, he heavily criticised the lack of internal debate within the outgoing parliamentary majority, stating: "When we all think the same thing, it is because in reality we do not think anything".

== Political positions ==
In May 2018, Renson co-sponsored an initiative in favour of legalising assisted reproductive technology (ART) for all women (singles, heterosexual couples or lesbian couples).

In July 2019, Renson voted in favour of the French ratification of the European Union's Comprehensive Economic and Trade Agreement (CETA) with Canada.

In 2020, Renson went against his parliamentary group's majority and abstained from an important vote on a much discussed security bill drafted by his colleagues Alice Thourot and Jean-Michel Fauvergue that would have helped, among other measures, curtail the filming of police forces. Although the bill passed Parliament, the disputed measure was struck down by the Constitutional Council before it would have entered in application.

In early 2021, Renson joined ten fellow LREM lawmakers in demanding the end of the state of emergency declared by the government of Prime Minister Jean Castex in response to the COVID-19 pandemic in France.
