= Delphine Bürkli =

French politician (born 1974)

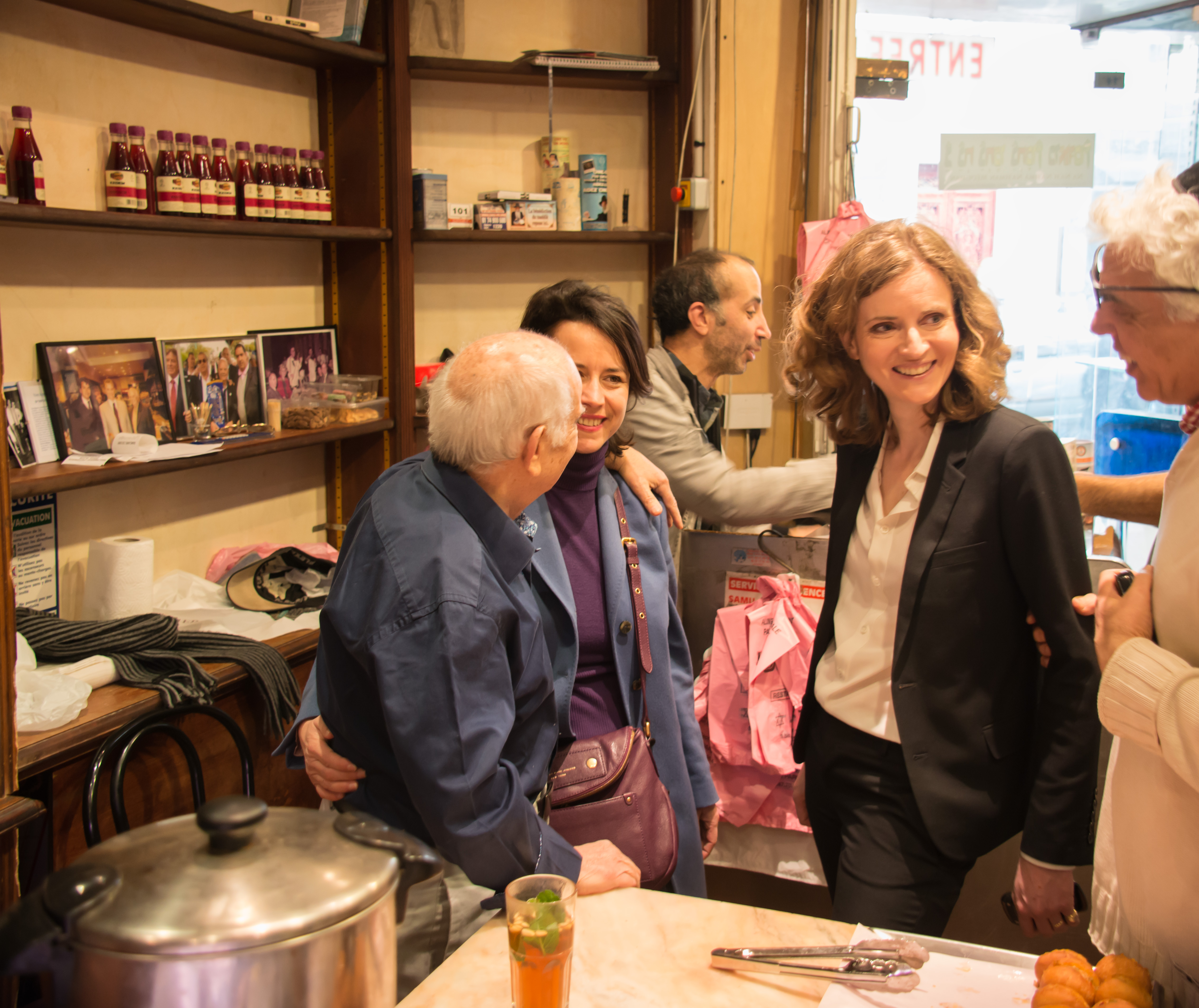
- Delphine Bürkli with Nathalie Kosciusko-Morizet in 2014

Mayor of 9th arrondissement of Paris
- Incumbent
- Assumed office 13 April 2014
- Preceded by: Jacques Bravo

Regional councilor for Île-de-France
- Incumbent
- Assumed office 18 December 2015
- President: Valérie Pécresse

Councilor of Paris
- Incumbent
- Assumed office 18 March 2008

Personal details
- Born: June 5, 1974 (age 51) Paris, France
- Party: Horizons (since 2021)

Delphine Bürkli (born June 5, 1974 in Paris) is a French politician.

Initially a parliamentary and ministerial assistant, she has been a Councilor of Paris since 2008 and the mayor of Paris's 9th arrondissement since 2014. She has also served as a regional councilor for Île-de-France since 2015 during the two terms of Valérie Pécresse.

== Early career ==
Delphine Bürkli was born in Paris to merchant parents. She pursued history at the Paris-Sorbonne University. Initially aiming to become a history teacher, her political involvement led her to meet Pierre Lellouche, who offered her a position as a parliamentary assistant after his election in 1997 as the deputy for the 4th constituency of Paris, representing RPR. In 2013, she founded a consulting firm, where she worked until early 2014.

== Career in politics ==
Delphine Bürkli became responsible for the UMP in the 4th constituency of Paris and led the list during the 2008 municipal elections in the 9th arrondissement. She was defeated by the incumbent socialist mayor, Jacques Bravo, but secured a position as a Paris city councilor.

In the 2014 municipal elections, Bürkli won the second round against the PS-PRG candidate Pauline Véron, garnering 50.4% of the vote.

In October 2014, she unanimously obtained the support of the Council of Paris for the project to inscribe the roofs of Paris on the UNESCO World Heritage list. She also advocated for implementing an urban toll at Paris's entrances to fund public transportation.

Bürkli was elected regional councilor of Île-de-France on Valérie Pécresse's list during the 2015 regional elections. She was re-elected mayor of the 9th arrondissement in 2020 in a three-way race against PS and LR, and subsequently re-elected as a regional councilor.

Bürkli supported Bruno Le Maire in the 2016 Republican primary and was appointed political advisor to his campaign in September 2016. In the 2017 presidential election's second round, she announced her support for Emmanuel Macron.

During the 2017 Republican Congress, she backed Maël de Calan. She joined La France Audacieuse, a movement launched by Christian Estrosi. She is also closely associated with Édouard Philippe, who supported her municipal campaign in June 2020.

In June 2019, Bürkli left LR and co-signed a manifesto with 72 right-wing and centrist elected officials supporting Emmanuel Macron. Ahead of the 2020 Paris municipal elections, she called for an alliance with LREM and a broader opposition program, including reformist ecologists like Yannick Jadot. In September 2019, she joined Benjamin Griveaux's campaign team and led the "conseil du quotidien des Parisiens." She was reappointed as the head of the list in the 9th arrondissement, where she was the incumbent mayor. After Griveaux's withdrawal, she was considered a potential successor. She led the first round with 36.9% of the votes and won the second round with 43.7% against Arnaud Ngatcha (UG) and Pierre Maurin (UD). She became co-president of the group of Independents and Progressives in the Paris Council alongside deputy Pierre-Yves Bournazel.

In December 2020, Bürkli, along with other center-right elected officials, supported Valérie Pécresse for the 2021 regional elections, even as LREM considered presenting an independent list. In October 2021, she joined Édouard Philippe in launching his new party, Horizons, where she serves as the referent for Paris while maintaining her affiliation with her former party.

== Honours ==
- Knight of the National Order of Merit
