= Françoise de Panafieu =

French politician

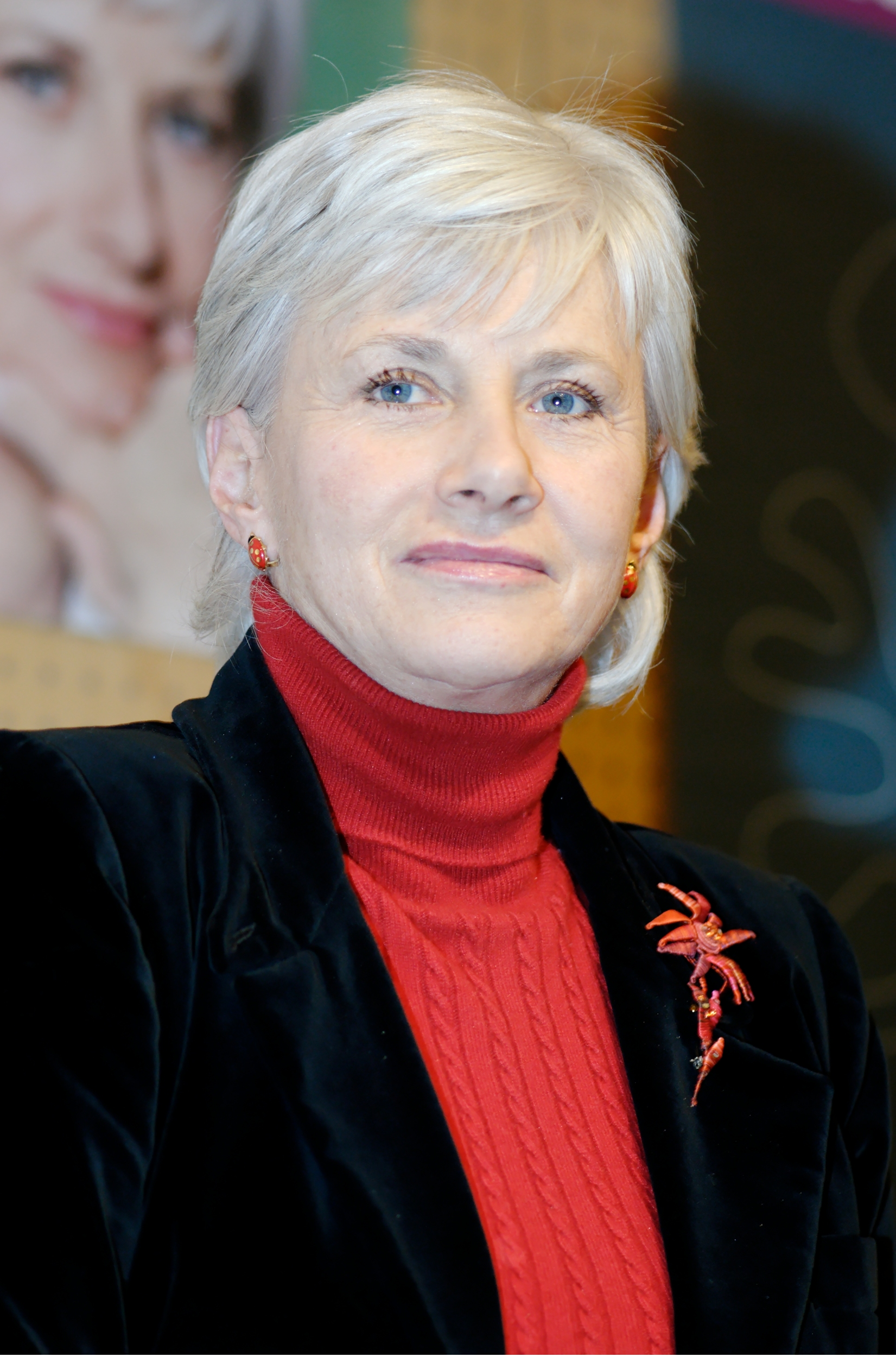
- Françoise de Panafieu in 2007

Mayor of the 17th arrondissement of Paris
- In office 19 March 2001 – 16 March 2008
- Preceded by: Pierre Rémond
- Succeeded by: Brigitte Kuster

Councillor of Paris
- In office 25 March 1979 – 30 March 2014
- Mayor: Jacques Chirac; Jean Tiberi; Bertrand Delanoë

Member of the National Assembly for Paris's 16th constituency
- In office 19 June 2002 – 19 June 2012
- Preceded by: Bernard Pons
- Succeeded by: Claude Goasguen

Personal details
- Born: 12 December 1948 (age 77) Moyeuvre-Grande, Moselle, France
- Party: UMP
- Spouse: Guy de Panafieu (m. 1970)
- Children: 4
- Parent(s): François Missoffe; Hélène de Mitry
- Relatives: Joséphine Missoffe (sister-in-law)
- Education: Paris Nanterre University

Françoise de Panafieu (born 12 December 1948) is a French politician, member of The Republicans (LR) party and mayor of the 17th arrondissement of Paris between 2001 and 2008.

== Political career ==
De Panafieu was a member of the French Cabinet as Minister of Tourism in 1995 and she has been a member of the National Assembly for Paris since 2002. She unsuccessfully ran for Paris mayorship in the 2008 municipal elections against Bertrand Delanoë, losing by almost 20 points.

Under the leadership of Anne Levade, De Panafieu was part of the organizing committee of the Republicans’ first-ever primary to select the party's candidate for the 2017 presidential election.

== Other activities ==
- Rencontres d'Arles, Member of the Board of Directors.

Party political offices
Preceded by Philippe Séguin	Union for a Popular Movement nominee for Mayor of Paris; 2008	Succeeded by Nathalie Kosciusko-Morizet
