= Hélène Missoffe =

French politician (1927–2015)

Deputy of the National Assembly for Paris's 24th constituency
- In office 26 July 1974 – 1 May 1977
- In office 19 March 1978 – 16 March 1986

Deputy of the National Assembly for Val-d'Oise
- In office 2 April 1986 – 29 September 1986

Senator for Val-d'Oise
- In office 28 September 1986 – 1 October 1995

Personal details
- Born: Hélène de Mitry; 15 June 1927 Paris, France
- Died: 22 January 2015 (aged 87) Paris, France
- Party: Union of Democrats for the Republic; Rally for the Republic
- Spouse: François Missoffe
- Children: 8
- Relatives: Françoise de Panafieu (daughter)

Hélène Missoffe (née Hélène de Mitry; 15 June 1927 – 22 January 2015) was a French Union of Democrats for the Republic later the Rally for the Republic politician. She was elected three times as a deputy of the National Assembly between 1974 and 1986, firstly to represent Paris's 24th constituency during the fifth and sixth legislatures of the National Assembly and lastly to represent the Val-d'Oise constituency at the eighth National Assembly legislature. Missoffe served as a senator in the French Senate for Val-d'Oise from 1986 to 1995 and was a vice-president of the Regional Council of Île-de-France. She was appointed Officier de la Légion d'honneur.

== Personal background ==
On 15 June 1927, Missoffe was born in the 9th arrondissement of Paris. She was the daughter of the Count Emmanuel de Mitry and Marguerite de Wendel, who was a descendant of the Wendel family. Missoffe was a Catholic. She was married to François Missoffe, the politician who was the former Ambassador of France to Japan, with whom she had eight children, including the politician Françoise de Panafieu. On 22 January 2015, Missoffe died in Paris. Her funeral took place five days later in Seine-Maritime.

== Career ==
Missoffe was a member of the Union of Democrats for the Republic and later the Rally for the Republic political party. She became a deputy for Paris's 24th constituency to be part of the fifth legislature of the National Assembly on 26 July 1974, replacing her husband whose temporary mission as Minister of Foreign Affairs was extended past half a year. Missoffe served as a member on the Committee on Cultural, Family and Social Affairs from 1974 to 1977, and was appointed the State Secretary to the Minister of Health and Social Security, by President Valéry Giscard d'Estaing on 1 April 1977. She remained in the post until 31 March 1978 prior to the dissolution of the Second Barre Government, and had been a councillor for Paris. Missoffe was appointed the Union of Democrats for the Republic's national secretary for women's action and then as its national delegate overseeing cultural, family and social affairs in 1975.

At the 1978 French legislative election on 19 March 1978, Missoffe was elected to serve the 24th district of Paris in the sixth legislature of the National Assembly that first convened on 3 April 1978 and dissolved on 22 May 1981. She again served as a member on the Committee on Cultural, Family and Social Affairs between 1978 and 1981. Missoffe won reelection to represent the 24th district of Paris in the seventh National Assembly legislature at the 1981 French legislative election held on 21 June 1981. As before, she was a member of the Committee on Cultural, Family and Social Affairs and remained a representative of her district until 4 January 1986. In 1981, Missoffe was elected councillor of the Regional Council of Île-de-France, serving as one of its vice-presidents from 1982 to 1986. She was made the Rally for the Republic's adviser for Paris in 1983 and was appointed chair of the Parliamentary Association for the Freedom of Education.

Missoffe was elected to represent the Val-d'Oise constituency at the eighth National Assembly legislature at the 1986 French legislative election on 16 March 1986. She was a member of the Foreign Affairs Committee of which she was its secretary and served on the National Assembly delegation for planning. Missoffe resigned on 30 September 1986, after she was elected to the French Senate representing the Val-d'Oise department. She was a member of the Social Affairs Committee, the Parliamentary Delegation for Demographic Problems and the National Committee for Retired and Elderly Persons. Missoffe stood down as a senator in September 1995, having decided not to stand for reelection. She made public speeches in support of bills to deal with unemployment and getting back into work and the formation of the French drug agency. Missoffe authored several articles in newspapers, and she was appointed Officier de la Légion d'honneur.
