= Alliance Royale =

Monarchist political party in France

Royal Alliance Alliance Royale
- President: Pierre Bernard
- Founder: Yves-Marie Adeline
- Founded: 25 January 2001; 25 years ago
- Headquarters: 17 rue des Acacias 75017, Champs-Élysées, Paris
- Ideology: Royalism; Monarchism; Reactionism; Euroscepticism; National conservatism
- Political position: Far-right
- European affiliation: None
- European Parliament group: No MEPs
- International affiliation: International Monarchist League
- Colours: White, Blue, Gold
- National Assembly: 0 / 577
- Senate: 0 / 348
- European Parliament: 0 / 74

Website
- www.alliance-royale.com

Royal Alliance (French: Alliance Royale, AR) is a French political party dedicated to the restoration of the monarchy in France and to increasing debate about the monarchy amongst the general public. The party was established in 2001 using the French symbol of the Fleur-de-lis as a logo, which was originally used by the monarchy in pre-revolutionary France. The party is also marked by its euroscepticism and seeks to re-establish a constitutional monarchy as an institution that identifies France within European culture.

== Founding ==
The party was established in 2001 by Yves-Marie Adeline as a popular channel seeking to connect with the public at large in order to widen the debate in France about monarchy, which is not a commonly discussed topic, and to encourage people to see the benefits of constitutional monarchy.

== Ideology and policy ==
The party has established itself with the aim of "encouraging France to prepare her future within her institutions," i.e., the institution of monarchy. The party believes in the restoration of a monarchy as a constitutional body, and although it considers the Orléanist pretender to be a viable candidate, it does not specify any dynasty that it prefers. The party cites cultural identity within Europe as one reason for which to re-establish monarchy, and is thus markedly Eurosceptic, describing the European Union as a body of European states with common objectives and not as a political union or superstate.

== Organisation ==
The party is split into regional groupings, with party activists in each region responsible for the promotion of the party and its cause.
