= Sylvain Garel =

French Green Party politician (b.1956)

Sylvain Garel (born 1956) is a French Green politician.

== Early life ==
Garel was born in the 18th arrondissement of Paris. He has a master's degree in Contemporary History and specializes in Film History.

He entered politics at age 17, in the Ecologist movement, after campaigning for René Dumont who was the first French ecologist to run for president. He joined the Green Party in 1989.

He trained as a teacher and works as a historian and film critic.

== Career ==
Garel founded a festival for Cinema of Quebec in France in 1991, over which he presided for six years. As a member of Critic's week, he attends the Cannes Festival. He was the vice-president of the French Trade Union for Cinema Critics.

An ardent anti-fascist, Garel in the early 1990s cofounded "Ras l'Front", a French network fighting racialism and white supremacy.

Garel is a Paris city councillor. He ran for Europe Écologie–The Greens in 2001. He is a former president of the Greens group, who deployed a banner in support of Chinese and Tibetan political prisoners while the 2008 Olympic torch was at the Eiffel Tower. On 29 January 2009, at a reception for the Chinese New Year at the Paris city hall, he submitted a memorandum requesting the release of Chinese and Tibetan political prisoners.

One of his political goals is to have the traditionalist Society of St. Pius X evicted from the Saint-Nicolas-du-Chardonnet church in Paris. In 2002, he led the Paris municipal council to pass a resolution against what he claims to be an illegal occupation. On 8 December 2003, he supported 200 illegal migrants to occupy this church for several hours. They had to leave the building after the intervention of a parishioners. As President of the district council of Montmartre, he turned the spot into the first green district of the capital.

In 2004, Garel opposed municipal subsidies for Jewish Loubavitch, claiming that they discriminate against non-Jewish children.

In 2006, Garel opposed giving John Paul II's name to a public place in front of the Notre-Dame Cathedral in Paris. Garel quoted the late Pope's opposition to abortion as a reason for not honouring him, along with his opposition to safe sex practices and opposition to contraception.

In 2010 he called for a National Day without a military parade. In September Garel opposed a settlement between the City of Paris and its former mayor Jacques Chirac in a corruption scandal. In October 2010, Garel promoted the opening of an experimental drug consumption room in Paris.

In 2011, he protested against the erection of a marble stele in the Saint-Nicolas-du-Chardonnet church, in memory of those who suffered for their fidelity to French Algeria.

In June 2011, Garel appeared on the "shame list" of French politicians published by Europe-Israel, a lobby fighting antisemitism, bigotry and anti-Zionism.

Garel was appointed in 2014 as a project manager for the International relationships of the City of Paris. In 2016 he joined the Association Internationale des Maires Francophones (AIMF) for promoting French-language cinema.
