= Yves-Marie Adeline =

French Catholic writer (born 1960)

Yves-Marie Adeline Soret de Boisbrunet
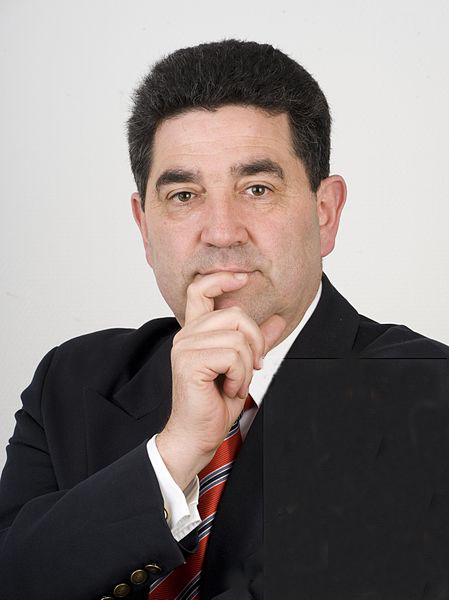
- Adeline in 2008
- Born: 24 March 1960 (age 66); Poitiers, France
- Occupations: Philosopher; author; politician

Yves-Marie Adeline Soret de Boisbrunet (born 24 March 1960 in Poitiers, France) better known as Yves-Marie Adeline, is a French Catholic writer. He also was the founder and leader of the French political party, Alliance Royale.

== Life ==
He is the father of eight. He taught at the University of Poitiers from 1986 till 1989, then left the university and alternated between writing books and collaboration in political office.

From 2003, he taught political science and philosophy in various higher education establishments such as the École Supérieure de Management en Alternance de Marne-la-Vallée. He currently teaches at the Tours business school (FBS).

== Philosophy ==
His philosophic work concerns three areas of research: in general philosophy, in aesthetics and in politics. In his book Le Carré des philosophes (The Square of Philosophers), he builds a "philosophic square" sides of which are four propositions: Science, Existence, Presence, and Will. The proposition "Existence" is original: Adeline distinguishes the being of the existence itself; according to him, existence is a dimension of the being. So we can say: the time exists, or a body exists, but a soul does not exist, it "is" only, it is without existing, without existence. The presence in the man of a power recovering from the being but not from the existence shows itself by the Will. Adeline wants it to be the criterion of distinction between the man and quite other creature. Adeline considers the will as typically human, rather than the consciousness, of which he considers that it is a little sure concept in philosophy. The will is on the contrary the demonstration of a being in the man, this nonexistent being which shows that a man is not only an object of existence.

Yves-Marie Adeline's aesthetic works update the doctrine of Empedocles according to whom "only the same knows the same", but also the aristotelian finalism, according to which the best expert of a saddle is not the craftsman, but the rider. In his book La Musique et le monde (The Music and the World), he fights against the official doctrine of the so-called "contemporary music", asserting that this music has been conceived on an exclusively theoretical vision. In L'Appel des sirènes (The Appeal of Sirens), Adeline develops his thought and widens it to the plastic arts.

In Le Pouvoir légitime (The Legitimate Power), preferring good institutions to good leaders, he recommends "an abdication of each of us for the benefit of a common and wholesome principle", and concludes that a modern monarchy is the best regime. Opponent of the maurrassism, or any other nationalism, he prefers Bonald, and advances the mixed regime.

Yves-Marie Adeline is also a poet: L'Epouse (The Wife); Le Manteau d'étoiles (The Coat of Stars); Radieuse hostie (Radiant Host); Les Angéliques (Angelica).

He has been the president of Alliance Royale, the French royalist party. Candidate with the European elections in 2004, then candidate with presidential election in 2007, he did not obtain the 500 votes of the mayors. With the municipal elections of March 2008 in the 7th arrondissement of Paris, he got 0.96%. He has since resigned the political militancy.

== Works ==
- L'Aube royale (Sicre 1991).
- La Musique et le monde (Téqui 1994).
- Le Roi et le monde moderne (C&T 1995).
- Le Carré des philosophes (Trédaniel 1995).
- La Droite piégée (C&T 1996).
- Le Pouvoir légitime (C&T 1997).
- La Droite où l'on n'arrive jamais (Sicre 2000).
- Le Royalisme en questions (Editions de Paris / L'Age d'Homme 2002).
- Les Amours dangereuses, poèmes (Editions Jean d'Orcival 1994).
- La Main offerte, poèmes (Editions Jean d'Orcival 1994).
- L'Epouse, poèmes (Sicre 2002).
- Le Manteau d'étoiles, poèmes (Editions de Paris 2002).
- Radieuse Hostie, poèmes (Editions de Paris 2004).
- L'Appel des sirènes (Editions de Paris 2004).
- Marie-Antoinette, Drame en cinq actes, Editions de Paris, 2005 (ISBN 2-85162-081-9).
- Histoire mondiale des idées politiques (Ellipses 2007).
- Les Angéliques, poèmes, Via Romana, 2008 (ISBN 978-2-916727-41-7).
- La Pensée antique, Ellipses, 2008.
