= Jacques Boutault =

French politician

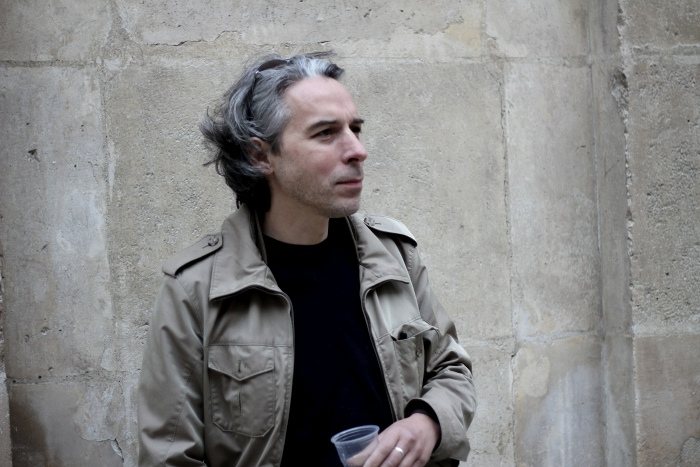

Mayor of 2nd arrondissement of Paris
- In office 18 March 2001 – 11 July 2020
- Preceded by: Benoîte Taffin
- Succeeded by: Ariel Weil (mayor of Paris Centre)

Paris City Councillor
- Incumbent
- Assumed office 9 March 2001
- Mayor: Bertrand Delanoë; Anne Hidalgo
- Constituency: 2nd arrondissement

Personal details
- Born: 4 January 1961 (age 65) Gennevilliers, France
- Party: EELV
- Profession: Journalist

Jacques Boutault (born 4 January 1961) is a French politician member of Europe Écologie Les Verts (EELV) and the mayor of the 2nd arrondissement of Paris between 2001 and 2020.

== Biography ==
The son of a Republican Guard and of a seamstress, he co-founded the first high school Comité d'action lycéen, in 1978 at the Joliot-Curie high school in Nanterre, he first campaigned in associations such as Droit devant !!, Greenpeace, Les Amis de la Terre and Attac.

Until 1996, in a close-knit team of amateur journalists, he published La Riposte, a fanzine devoted to politics, sex and drugs.

After a graduate diploma at the School of Advanced Studies in Information and Communication (Celsa Paris IV-Sorbonne), he worked for ten years as a journalist (L'Usine nouvelle, Challenges, Liaisons sociales, Rebondir...)). In 1995, he was recruited to create the press service of Unédic, then in 1998 he took charge of the Internal Communication Department, which he left in 2009. He now holds a part-time job in the Pôle emploi as an advisor to the Directorate-General for sustainable development. He wrote a book about unemployment insurance, for the Que sais-je? collection.

In 1996, with Jean-Paul Maurel, he created the association "Bien vivre dans le 2e arrondissement", which brings together residents committed to improving the quality of life in their neighborhood in terms of transport, housing and education.

=== Political engagement ===
He joined the Green party in 1997. Close to the left wing of this party, and opposed to the participation of the environmental movement in the government of Lionel Jospin, Jacques Boutault was then delegated to the departmental council of Paris (1998 to 2001) and member of the inter-regional national council from 2001 to 2003. As the leader for the ENVIE motion (18.96% of the votes) at the first EÉLV congress in La Rochelle in 2011, he was elected to the federal council and to the movement's political orientation council.

In June 2012, he published a press book called Mon Pari (s) vert, at Éditions Presse Pluriel, in which he retraces his personal political journey, explains his convictions in matters of political ecology and announces his intention to run for mayor of Paris in 2014.

At the Caen congress in November 2013, he was the male leader of La motion participative (LMP) alongside Lucile Schmid. LMP (of which Yves Cochet, Karima Delli and Alain Lipietz are members) is in second position with 20.58% of the votes. He integrates the executive office, the direction of the movement, and takes charge of relations with associative actors and the cooperative network.

==== 2001 municipal election ====
Jacques Boutault is running for municipal elections in the second arrondissement of Paris in 2001 with a program focused on improving traffic, social housing, setting up organic and vegetarian menus in school canteens, working with associations .

On 11 March 2001, he won 16.78% of the vote in the borough. He was outdistanced by the socialist candidate Pierre Schapira, who nevertheless withdrew, according to the Parisian electoral agreement of reciprocal withdrawal with the socialist party. Both lists merge into a new one, led by Boutault who then wins the election in the second round by 300 votes ahead of the list of outgoing mayor, Benoîte Taffin.

He focuses its policy on strengthening solidarity actions with the most deprived, organic meals in canteens, improving living conditions and the environment and developing citizen participation through participatory democracy.

==== 2008 municipal election ====
His relations with the socialist mayor of Paris, Bertrand Delanoë, are nevertheless tense. At the end of 2007, Jacques Boutault published a column in the daily Le Monde where he challenged the posture of the mayor of Paris which consisted in overaking the municipal achievements of environmentalists while criticizing them harshly. He is involved with poorly housed families who occupy Rue de la Banque (2nd), from October to December 2007. On 30 January 2008, during a public meeting, Bertrand Delanoë suggests that the mayor Green of the 2nd arrondissement organized "smoking pot parties" in his office and very much hopes that the socialist candidate in the 2nd arrondissement, Sylvie Wieviorka, will marginalize the list of Greens during the municipal elections of 2008.

In the first round of the 2008 municipal elections, the Greens list led by Jacques Boutault, gathered 29.93% of the vote, and made almost equal play with that made up of the Socialist Party of the French Communist Party, the Republican and Citizen Movement and the Radical Party on the left, led by Sylvie Wieviorka, who won 33.12% of the vote.

Its list is notably supported by the inhabitants or professionals working in the 2nd arrondissement of Paris like: Gérard Depardieu, Sapho, Guy Bedos, Sanseverino, Martine Billard and also by Raphaël Mezrahi, Renaud, Dominique Belpomme, Tahar Ben Jelloun, Albert Jacquard, etc. .

The reciprocal withdrawal agreements in all the Parisian districts being renewed by Bertrand Delanoë, he took the lead of the merged list for the second round. On 16 March 2008, the list he led reached 68.34% of the vote, a score never achieved by the left in the 2nd arrondissement of Paris.

==== 2012 legislative elections ====
He is a candidate in the legislative election of June 2012 in the 1st district of Paris which regroups the 1st, 2nd, 8th and 9th arrondissements of the capital. It ranks third, collecting 6.05% of the votes cast.

==== 2014 municipal elections ====
On 14 March 2013, he declared his candidacy for the head of the EÉLV list for the 2014 municipal elections in Paris.

In the March 2014 elections, with a score of 32.96%, the list of Jacques Boutault outstripped the list of the UMP (24.25%) and the Socialist Party (22.82%) in the first round. A dissident UMP list achieved 11.01% while the Front de Gauche stood at 2.8%. In the second round, the environmentalist and citizen, Socialist and Left Front list came out on top with 58.24% of the vote. Jacques Boutault was re-elected mayor of the 2nd arrondissement for the third time in April 2014.

He supports Michèle Rivasi for the ecological presidential primary in 2016.

==== 2017 Senate elections ====
For the 2017 senatorial elections, he is No. 2 on the ecological list in Paris.

== Political positions and municipal action ==
=== Palestine ===
He participated on Saturday, 19 July 2014 in a demonstration of support for the Palestinian people of Gaza, banned by the police headquarters "because of the risk of disturbing public order". He responded to the call from EELV Île-de-France which invited the elected representatives available to go there with their scarves, as observers. Prime Minister Manuel Valls condemns the elected officials who participated in these illegal demonstrations, at the National Assembly by making explicit reference to Jacques Boutault.

He explains his participation in this event in a press release reproduced on his blog. He says he is the victim of insults and "political nonsense": "No one will silence and intimidate human rights defenders, supporters of dialogue between peoples". While denouncing "the massacre of a population by the army of a State", he declares that he has "always mobilized to defend Jewish memory and the right for Israel to live in peace". Finally, he explains that he has heard "no anti-Semitic or anti-Jewish slogan, and found no presence of Islamist proselytism. ".

=== Syria and Turkey ===
Jacques Boutault has affirmed his support for the Free Syrian Army (ASL) which is fighting both Daesh and the forces of Bashar Al Assad. In December 2016, he went to Syria with a delegation of elected officials, including Cécile Duflot, Patrick Menucci and Hervé Mariton, to negotiate a humanitarian truce, the establishment of a security corridor in Aleppo, for the evacuation civilians from Aleppo besieged for many weeks and the dropping of food.

In March 2019, he published a press release denouncing the "silence of the French authorities for many years on the actions carried out by the AKP on French national territory". Threats, even assaults, are directed against people of Kurdish origin or opponents of the Recep Tayyip Erdoğan regime by supporters of the latter.

=== Food policy ===
Jacques Boutault introduced organic food in school canteens from 2001. In 2017, 96% of the food served to students in school restaurants in the 2nd arrondissement is organic (or labeled Label Rouge or Responsible Fishing). Short circuits are preferred, and the municipality prohibits food from GMO crops, palm oil and fish caught in deep water. Since 2009, a vegetarian, organic and local meal has been served every week for all students of the 2nd lunch in the canteen. A daily vegetarian and organic alternative has been served to secondary school and high school students since March 2017. This measure has been extended to all schoolchildren since the start of the school year in September 2017.

Invested against food waste, Jacques Boutault launched in 2014 a pilot operation in two 2nd class establishments, which was extended in 2015 to all schools in the district: the collection of food waste from schoolchildren and their recycling into compost and methane.

=== Respect for animal condition ===
Invested in respecting animal conditions, Jacques Boutault is a vegetarian. He signed a forum denouncing the conditions of keeping animals in circuses and deposited with the Council of Paris several wishes calling for the prohibition of circuses using wild animals in Paris. He was at the origin of the workgroup "Animals in the city" of the City of Paris.

Jacques Boutault has gradually reduced speed to 30 km/h in the three districts of the 2nd arrondissement. It has also pedestrianized part of rue Montmartre and is working to transform, at the initiative of borough councilor Jean-Paul Maurel, the Louvre-Aboukir-Montmartre small square into a convivial space reserved for pedestrians.

=== Opposition to advertising ===
Jacques Boutault originated several local regulatory projects against the advertising tarpaulins on public buildings and places of worship when these buildings are having restoration work performed.

=== Support for pseudo-medicines ===
Convinced that homeopathy works, he is criticized by scientific skeptics for his support for pseudo-medicines, especially after he organized a debate entitled "Complementary medicine: myth or reality?" at the 2nd arrondissement City Hall.
