= Nicole Questiaux =

French politician (born 1930)

Nicole Questiaux (born 19 December 1930) is a French politician. She served as the Minister of National Solidarity from 1981 to 1983, under former President François Mitterrand.

== Biography ==
She was a member of the Centre d'études, de recherches et d'éducation socialiste, now known as the Citizen and Republican Movement. From 1981 to 1983, she served as French Minister of National Solidarity, and was dubbed 'Queen of Hearts' for her disregard for keeping a budget. She quit her position and was replaced by Pierre Bérégovoy. In 1989, she gave the Chortley Lecture of the Modern Law Review.

== Bibliography ==
- Le pouvoir du social (1979)
- Traité du social : Situations, luttes, politiques, institutions (Études politiques, économiques et sociales) (1984)
- The Welfare state and its aftermath (1985, Shmuel Noah Eisenstadt (ed.), Ora Ahimeir (ed.))
- French administrative law (1987, withLionel Neville Brown, John Francis Garner)
- Le Conseil d'État français et la norme communautaire: l'hybridation entant que technique juridique (1997)
