= Raphaële Bidault-Waddington =

French artist and researcher

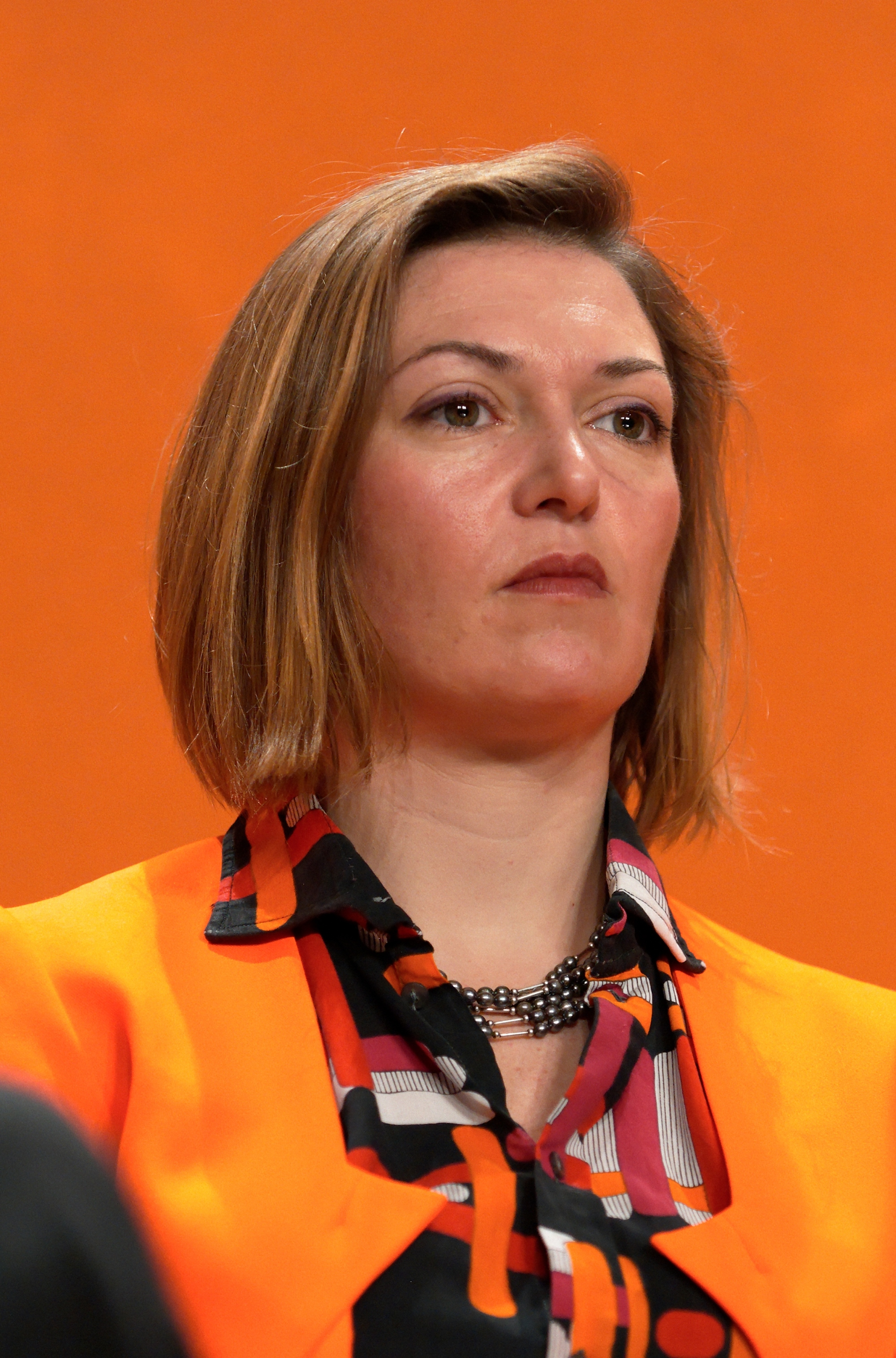
- Born: 1971 (age 54–55)
- Known for: Art-based research

Raphaële Bidault-Waddington (born 1971) is an artist-researcher and writer based in Paris, France, who frequently collaborates with universities, companies and city authorities around the world.

== Artistic practice ==
Bidault-Waddington organized her practice via "labs" all part of the LIID Future Lab to pursue her research on urban development, immaterial economy, images, value and knowledge in the broader context of digital and environmental transitions. As a post-conceptual artist, her statement has been since 2000 that Art is a multifaceted way of thinking, producing knowledge and experimenting that has a value far beyond the art domain. Her practice shows similarities with the emerging field of Critical Design and speculative design.

These laboratories' output includes exhibitions, workshops, conferences, artist talks and publications and mixes artistic, academic and future insights.

Her work is often financed by structures outside the art world such as a corporation who aims to benefit from the knowledge production mechanisms surrounding art as a force of creation and renewal. In this instance, the artist's laboratory acts as service enterprise for which she develops particular research tools such as the aesthetic audit, an experimental audit method she applies to both corporations and cities. The findings of her research can take the form of texts, conceptual diagrams, image compositions or site-specific installations.
Bidault-Waddington is a member of the New Club of Paris, an international network of immaterial economy and innovation experts.

== LIID Future Lab ==
LIID was founded in the year 2000 by Raphaële Bidault-Waddington and stand for Laboratoire d'Ingénierie d'IDées (Idea Engineering Lab). In 2006 it was renamed LIID Future Lab.

In 2003, an extensive study on the future of Christiania mapped out the path LIID would later continue on, mixing Art, Economy and urban development. Since 2011, LIID collaborates each year with Peclers Future Trends to co-create their global forecasts - Cahier Futur(s) - and a series of urban prospective studies. The topics addressed range from the construction of the self and identity codes, to the future of the collaborative economy, the city and AI.

Other notable partners of LIID are or have been the SciencesPo School in Paris, Architecture Faculty of Republica University in Montevideo, Aalto University in Helsinki, Institute for the Future in Palo Alto California, the Center for Molecular Medicine in Stockholm and Tongji University in Shanghai.

== Publishing ==
Between 2009 and 2011, Bidault-Waddington regularly contributed to Tale(s) Magazine where she was appointed editor-in-chief of the Vision section dedicated to art, architecture, ideas and literature.

== Exhibitions ==
- Semiospace, Corner College, Zurich, 2014
- Cities Methodologies, UCL Urban Laboratory at the Slade Research Center, London, 2013
- Paris Galaxies, a vision for the Greater Paris", Paris College of Art, 2012
- Mental Matter, Espace d'En Bas, Paris, 2011
- The Incidental Person (after John Latham), curated by Antony Hudek, apexart, New York, 2010
- My Small Enterprise, Centre d'art contemporain, Meymac, 2003
