= Dominique Bertinotti =

French politician and historian

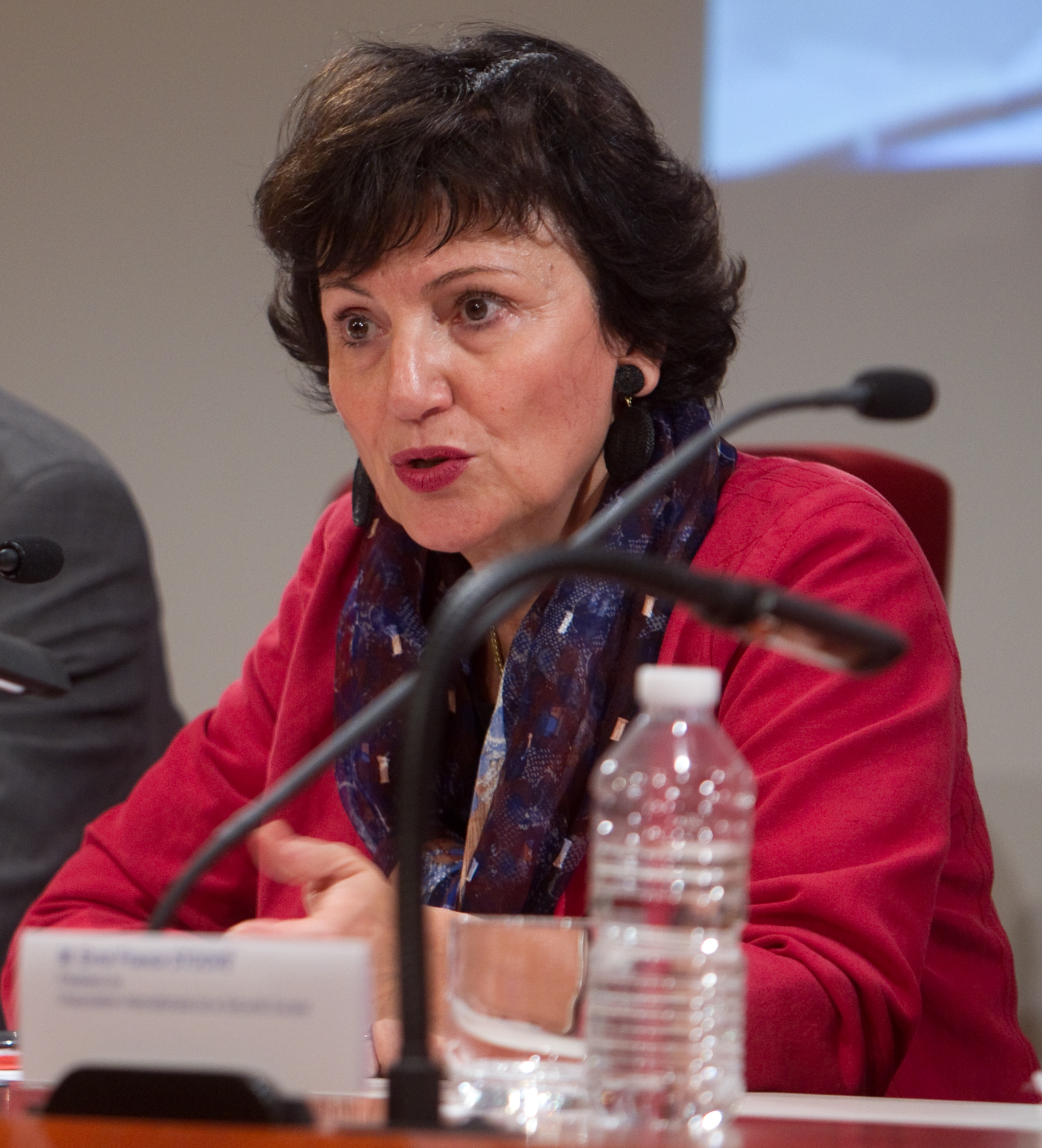
- Dominique Bertinotti in 2012

Minister Delegate to the Family
- In office 16 May 2012 – 31 May 2014
- President: François Hollande
- Prime Minister: Jean-Marc Ayrault
- Preceded by: Claude Greff
- Succeeded by: Laurence Rossignol

Mayor of the 4th arrondissement of Paris
- In office 2 April 2001 – 2 July 2012
- Preceded by: Lucien Finel
- Succeeded by: Christophe Girard

Personal details
- Born: 10 January 1954 (age 72) 16th arrondissement of Paris, France
- Party: Socialist Party; 1 July Movement
- Education: Paris 1 Panthéon-Sorbonne University

Dominique Bertinotti (French pronunciation: [dɔminik bɛʁtinɔti]; born 10 January 1954) is a French politician, lecturer at the Paris Diderot University, a member of the Socialist Party and mayor of the 4th arrondissement of Paris from 2001 to 2012. On 16 May 2012, she was appointed Minister for Family in the first Ayrault Cabinet and was renewed in her role in the next government. In 2017, she joined the 1 July Movement.

== See also ==
- 2008 Paris municipal election
