= Jean-François Pernin =

French journalist and politician (1942–2024)

Member of the Council of Paris
- In office 2001–2008

Mayor of the 12th arrondissement of Paris
- In office 1995–2001
- Preceded by: Paul Pernin
- Succeeded by: Michèle Blumenthal

Personal details
- Born: 20 January 1942
- Died: 13 February 2024 (aged 82)
- Party: UDF
- Occupation: Journalist

Jean-François Pernin (20 January 1942 – 13 February 2024) was a French journalist and politician of the Union for French Democracy (UDF).

== Biography ==
Born on 20 January 1942, Pernin was the son of fellow politician Paul Pernin. He worked for Le Monde as a journalist for 20 years. In 1995, under the list of Camille Cabana, he was elected Mayor of the 12th arrondissement of Paris and became an advisor to President Jacques Chirac. In 2001, he battled socialist Michèle Blumenthal before narrowly losing in the second round. However, he was elected to the Council of Paris that year. In 2007, he ran for the National Assembly in Paris's 8th constituency, losing in the first round after obtaining 12.31% of the vote.

In 2008, he refused to run with MoDem and instead entered the race as an independent. He earned 6.50% of the vote.

Jean-François Pernin died on 13 February 2024, at the age of 82.
