= Jacques Bravo =

French politician (1943–2019)

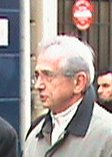

Councillor of Paris
- In office 23 June 1995 – 4 April 2014
- Mayor: Jean Tiberi; Bertrand Delanoë

President of the Paris City Council Finance Commission
- In office 25 March 2001 – 21 March 2008
- Succeeded by: Jean-François Legaret

Mayor of the 9th arrondissement of Paris
- In office 2 April 2001 – 13 April 2014
- Preceded by: Gabriel Kaspereit
- Succeeded by: Delphine Bürkli

Personal details
- Born: 29 December 1943 Valognes, France
- Died: 18 December 2019 (aged 75)
- Party: Socialist Party
- Occupation: Politician

Jacques Bravo (29 December 1943 – 18 December 2019) was a French politician who was a member of the Socialist Party.

== Biography ==
After he graduated from ENSAE ParisTech in 1968, Bravo worked for the Minister of National Education.

He began his political career in 1983 at the Ministry of the Economy and Finance before being appointed as Financial Director at the Ministry of Higher Education and Research along with Laurent Fabius and Hubert Curien. A member of the Socialist Party, he ran for the 9th arrondissement of Paris in the 1983 French municipal elections, which he lost. He was beaten again in 1989 and 1995. He was on the board of directors at ESPCI Paris and was present when Pierre-Gilles de Gennes and Georges Charpak won the Nobel Prize in Physics. In 1993, he was named Inspector General of Education in Limousin.

Bravo was finally victorious in the 9th arrondissement in 2001. He secured 52% of the vote in the second round, defeating Pierre Lellouche, and became President of the Finance Commission. In 2008, he was re-elected with 63% of the vote.

In 2004, Bravo he was involved in a protest against the extradition of far-right Italian terrorist Cesare Battisti. With the singer Lio and the writer Fred Vargas, he formed a committee against far-right terrorism. He reported weekly on the judicial review of Battisti's murders. In 2019, Battisti admitted to committing two murders and sponsoring two others.

In 2013, Bravo was awarded in the Legion of Honour as Commander.

In the 2014 French municipal elections, Bravo would not stand for re-election. The Socialist Party candidate, Pauline Véron, lost to Delphine Bürkli.

Jacques Bravo died on 18 December 2019 at the age of 75, just 11 days before his 76th birthday.
