= René Galy-Dejean =

French politician (1932–2026)

René Galy-Dejean (16 March 1932 – 29 January 2026) was a French politician who served as mayor of Paris’s 15th arrondissement from 1983 to 2008 and as a Deputy for Paris’s 13th constituency from 1991 to 2007. Over his career, he was affiliated with the Movement of Socilist Democrats, the Rally for the Republic (RPR), and later the Union for a Popular Movement (UMP). He began his political career as an aide to President Georges Pompidou.

== Early career and government service ==
After studying law, Galy-Dejean began his career in ministerial offices. From 1962 to 1967, he served as private secretary, deputy chief of staff, and then chief of staff to Jacques Marette, Minister of Posts and Telecommunications. He later joined the office of Prime Minister Georges Pompidou at Matignon.

Following Pompidou’s election as President of the Republic in 1969, Galy-Dejean became chargé de mission and then technical adviser at the presidential secretariat. In January 1974, he was appointed chief of staff to the President, a position he held until Pompidou’s death on 2 April 1974.

== Political career ==
Galy-Dejean held local office early in his career, serving as deputy mayor of Paris’s 15th arrondissement (1964–1965) and later as a member of the Council of Paris (1971–1977). He was elected mayor of the 15th arrondissement in 1983 and remained in office for 25 years.

In 1991, he was elected to the French National Assembly in a by-election for Paris’s 13th constituency. He was subsequently re-elected several times, serving until 2007.

He acted as treasurer for Édouard Balladur’s 1995 presidential campaign. In 2011, he was questioned as an assisted witness by investigating magistrate Renaud Van Ruymbeke regarding a disputed cash deposit into the campaign account, which he denied.

During the 2001 Paris municipal elections, he ran as an independent right-wing candidate. After the first round, his list merged with that of Édouard Balladur, and they won the runoff against the Socialist list led by Anne Hidalgo. He was re-elected mayor of the 15th arrondissement.

In 2007, after the UMP declined to endorse him for re-election to the National Assembly in favor of Jean-François Lamour, Galy-Dejean ran as a dissident candidate and was subsequently expelled from the party. He was eliminated in the first round. After this defeat, he helped form the “Paris Libre” group on the Council of Paris and retired from political life in 2008.

He died on 29 January 2026, at the age of 93.

== Honors ==
- Knight of the Legion of Honour (1986)
- Knight of the National Order of Merit (1964)
