= Bertrand Delanoë =

Mayor of Paris from 2001 to 2014

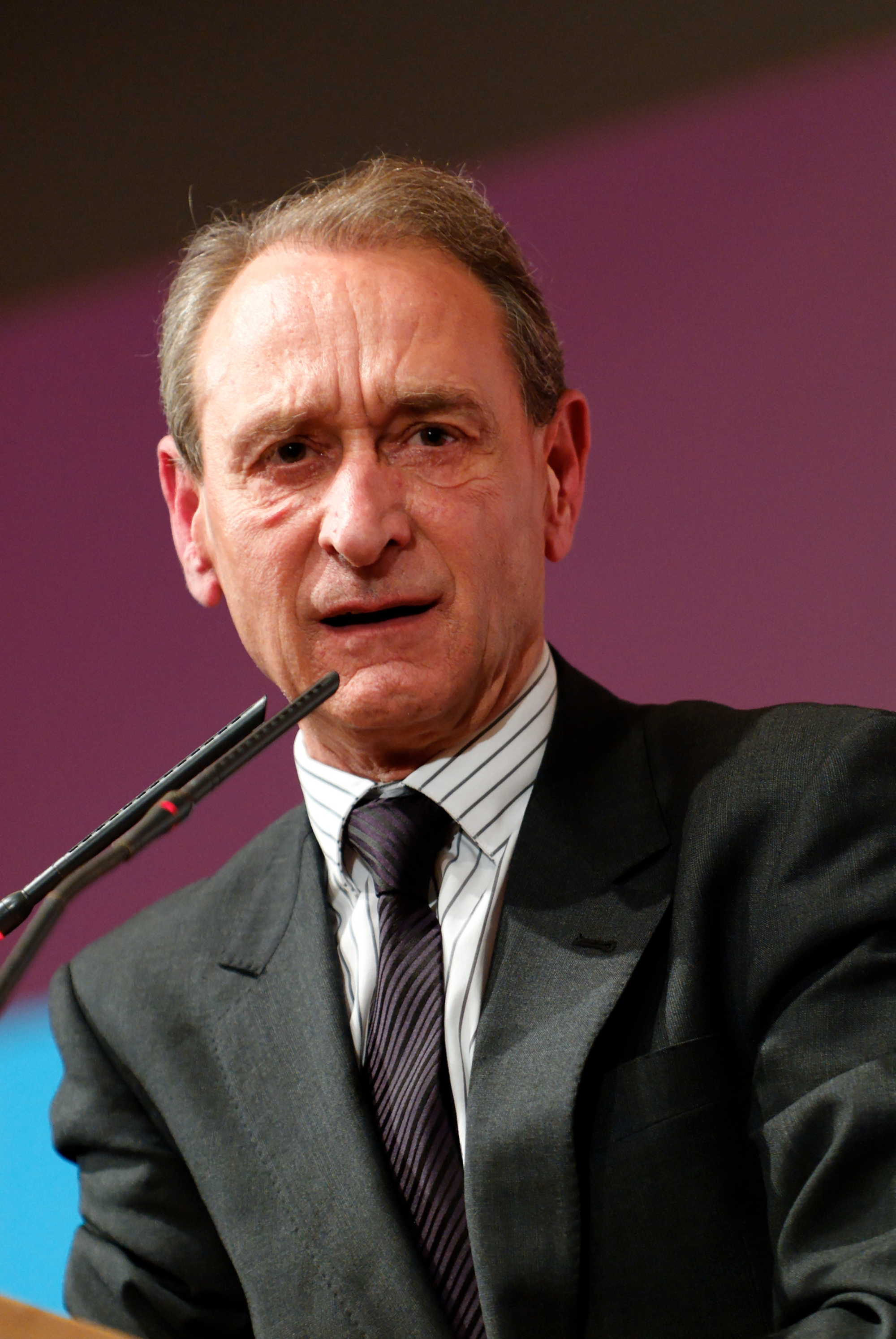
- Delanoë in 2008

Mayor of Paris
- In office 25 March 2001 – 5 April 2014
- Deputy: Anne Hidalgo
- Preceded by: Jean Tiberi
- Succeeded by: Anne Hidalgo

Member of the Senate
- In office 24 September 1995 – 27 March 2001
- Constituency: Paris

Member of the National Assembly
- In office 21 June 1981 – 1 April 1986
- Preceded by: Joël Le Tac
- Succeeded by: Constituency abolished
- Constituency: Paris's 26th constituency

Personal details
- Born: 30 May 1950 (age 76) Tunis, French Tunisia
- Party: Socialist Party
- Education: University of Toulouse
- Website: Official website

Bertrand Delanoë (French: [bɛʁtʁɑ̃ dəlanɔe]; born 30 May 1950) is a French retired politician who served as Mayor of Paris from 2001 to 2014. A member of the Socialist Party (PS), he previously served in the National Assembly from 1981 to 1986 and in the Senate from 1995 until 2001.

== Early life and education ==
Delanoë was born 30 May 1950 in Tunis, at that time a protectorate of the French colonial empire, to a French mother and a French-Tunisian father. His father, a land surveyor, was atheist while his mother, a nurse, was Roman Catholic.

At 6 years old, Delanoë became a member of the "Petits Chanteurs des Sables", a Christian choral group associated with the Petits Chanteurs à la Croix de Bois. At the age of 11, Delanoë witnessed the crisis of Bizerte between France and newly independent Tunisia. Bertrand Delanoë moved back to France with his family following Tunisian independence; after the military base in Bizerte was closed in 1963, Delanoë's family broke up. His mother came to live in Rodez, Aveyron with her son. After leaving school, Delanoë is said to have started studies in law at the University of Toulouse. According to Who's Who in France he has a diploma in economics.

== Career ==
=== Early political career ===
Delanoë has been involved in politics since the age of twenty-three as the secretary of the Socialist federation in Aveyron.

He was first elected to the Council of Paris in 1977. In 1981, he was elected to the National Assembly. In 1993, he became the head of the city's Socialist Party branch. In 1995, he was elected to the Senate, where he was secretary of the Committee on Foreign Affairs and Defence.

=== Mayor of Paris ===
Delanoë became Mayor of Paris on 18 March 2001, when control of the Council of Paris was won by a left-wing alliance for the first time since 1977 (election with universal suffrage). His predecessors were Jean Tiberi (1995–2001) and Jacques Chirac (1977–1995), who resigned after 18 years as mayor when he was elected President of the French Republic.

Delanoë won the mayorship of Paris at the head of a coalition of Socialists, Greens and Communists, over the conservative candidates Jean Tiberi and Philippe Séguin, who were unable to resolve their differences and thereby split the conservative vote. This success in a city which had traditionally been a stronghold of the right until the end of the 20th century was made all the more striking by setbacks to the left in the 2001 municipal elections that occurred more generally. It has been partially attributed with the weariness of the Parisian public with respect to various scandals of corruption and graft in the preceding administrations.

Delanoë was virtually unknown before the election of 2001, but soon gained fame for organising new and unusual events in Paris, such as the "Paris Beach" (Paris-Plages) on the banks of the Seine every summer in order to give Parisians who could not take a regular vacation a chance to relax, sunbathe and build sandcastles in the center of Paris. The program, especially popular with families with children, has been in place since 2002, and has since been copied by many other international cities.

As mayor, Delanoë's goals were to improve the quality of life, reduce pollution, and cut down on vehicle traffic within the city (including a plan for a non-polluting tramway to ease Parisian traffic) and pedestrian malls. He helped introduce a program called Vélib' (a portmanteau of "vélo" and "libre" meaning "free bicycles") which gave Parisians access to inexpensive rental bicycles available in stations all around Paris. The program has been enormously successful despite the fact that it still has a few logistical problems to be worked out. He outlined a plan for an autolib, whereby small cars would be shared. He was reelected in 2008 (57.7%) for a new six-year-term (2008–2014).

Ahead of the Socialist Party's 2008 convention in Reims, Delanoë publicly endorsed Martine Aubry as candidate to succeed François Hollande at the party's leadership.

In 2009, Delanoë criticized statements by Pope Benedict XVI about how condom use was unhelpful or even counter-productive in the fight against AIDS.

Ahead of the Socialist Party's 2012 convention in Toulouse, Delanoë endorsed Harlem Désir as candidate to succeed Aubry at the party's leadership.

==== Assassination attempt ====
Delanoë was stabbed on 5 October 2002 during the Nuit Blanche, a night of festivities in Paris, while mingling with the public. His assailant was a Muslim immigrant, Azedine Berkane, who reportedly told police that "he hated politicians, the Socialist Party, and homosexuals." Before being taken to hospital, Delanoë ordered that the festivities continue. Delanoë's wound was not life-threatening and he left the hospital after about two weeks.

Azedine Berkane was eventually permitted to leave the psychiatric hospital where he had been a patient after his doctors no longer considered him a threat. However, in early April 2007, he failed to keep a scheduled appointment with his doctors. Paris police recaptured him on May 22. He was returned to the psychiatric facility and placed into a high-security unit.

==== Olympic bid ====
The failure to secure the 2012 Summer Olympics for Paris on 6 July 2005 was Delanoë's first major setback as mayor. In the aftermath of the defeat in his Olympic bid, he accused British prime minister Tony Blair of unduly influencing the result in order to secure the games in London. However, Delanoë's popularity in fact rose during July 2005. The French public appeared to have laid more of the blame on President Jacques Chirac, who allegedly said that "the only worse food than British food is Finnish" which is widely believed to have offended two Finnish members of the International Olympic Committee.

=== Potential presidential bid ===
Delanoë was said to be considering challenging then-current president Sarkozy in the Presidential election in 2012. However, this plan suffered a setback in November 2008 when he lost the race for the party leadership to Lille mayor Martine Aubry.

=== Fake The New York Times letter ===
On 22 December 2008, The New York Times published a letter attributed to Delanoë criticizing Caroline Kennedy's candidacy for the United States Senate seat vacated by Hillary Clinton. The newspaper later admitted that the letter, which had been sent by email, had not been properly verified, and was a fake.

== Personal life ==
Delanoë was one of the first major French politicians to announce that he was gay, during a 1998 television interview (before being elected mayor). Although a long-time politician, Delanoë is visible at cultural affairs. He attends film festivals, and he is sometimes quoted in the media or appears on television to speak about his friendship with the late French superstar entertainer, Dalida.

== Electoral mandates ==
National Assembly of France

Member of the National Assembly for Paris (Paris's 26th constituency): 1981–1986. Elected in 1981.

Senate of France

Member of the Senate for Paris: 1995–2001 (resignation).

Council of Paris

Mayor of Paris: Elected in 2001. Reelected in 2008.

Councillor of Paris: Elected in 1977. Reelected in 1983, 1989, 1995, 2001, 2008.

== See also ==
- List of mayors of Paris
- LGBT culture in Paris

Political offices
Preceded by Jean Tiberi	Mayor of Paris; 2001–2014	Succeeded by Anne Hidalgo
Party political offices
Preceded by Pierre Joxe	Socialist Party nominee for Mayor of Paris; 1995 (lost) • 2001 (won) • 2008 (won)	Succeeded by Anne Hidalgo
