= Results of the 2024 French legislative election in Paris =

Following the first round of the 2024 French legislative election on 30 June 2024, runoff elections in each constituency where no candidate received a vote share greater than 50 percent were scheduled for 7 July. Candidates permitted to stand in the runoff elections needed to either come in first or second place in the first round or achieve more than 12.5 percent of the votes of the entire electorate (as opposed to 12.5 percent of the vote share due to low turnout).

== Paris ==
=== 1st constituency ===
Candidate	Party or alliance		First round		Second round	
Candidate	Party or alliance		Votes	%	Votes	%
Sylvain Maillard	Ensemble	Renaissance	28,048	44.70	35,239	63.64
Raphaël Kempf	New Popular Front	La France Insoumise	20,138	32.09	20,132	36.36
Delphine Voirin	National Rally		6,303	10.04		
Laurence Sailliet	The Republicans		3,469	5.53		
Pierre Maurin	The Republicans (Note: Dissident who ran without the support of the National Investiture Committee (CNI))		2,883	4.59		
Marine Chiaberto	Reconquête		991	1.58		
Alban Ludovic Bertrand Pineau	Miscellaneous centre	Independent	598	0.95		
Laurence Boulinier	Far-left	Lutte Ouvrière	231	0.37		
Mathilde Contensou	Volt		89	0.14		
Axel Metzker	Independent	Independent	3	0.00		
Aurélien Gautreau	Far-left		0	0.00		
Total			62,753	100.00	55,371	100.00
Valid votes			62,753	98.95	55,371	95.63
Invalid votes			173	0.27	598	1.03
Blank votes			495	0.78	1,931	3.34
Total votes			63,421	100.00	57,900	100.00
Registered voters/turnout			84,309	75.22	84,312	68.67

=== 2nd constituency ===
Candidate	Party or alliance		First round		Second round	
Candidate	Party or alliance		Votes	%	Votes	%
Marine Rosset	New Popular Front	Socialist Party	18,845	33.40	21,784	43.50
Jean Laussucq	Ensemble	Renaissance	13,325	23.62	28,294	56.50
Gilles Le Gendre	Miscellaneous centre	Renaissance (Note: Dissident who ran without the support of Ensemble)	11,071	19.62		
Melody De Witte	National Rally		6,206	11.00		
Félicité Herzog de Cossé Brissac	Miscellaneous right	Independent	3,792	6.72		
Romain Marsily	Miscellaneous right	Independent	1,229	2.18		
Ornella Evangelista	Reconquête		778	1.38		
Cécile Marie Lorans	Ecologists	Independent	512	0.91		
Frédéric Mauriange	Miscellaneous centre	Ecologists	430	0.76		
Charline Joliveau	Far-left	Lutte Ouvrière	168	0.30		
Élise Magne	Volt		60	0.11		
Clara Sacasa	Far-left	Independent	0	0.00		
Total			56,416	100.00	50,078	100.00
Valid votes			56,416	99.14	50,078	95.73
Invalid votes			153	0.27	575	1.10
Blank votes			337	0.59	1,656	3.17
Total votes			56,906	100.00	52,309	100.00
Registered voters/turnout			74,579	76.30	74,579	70.14

=== 3rd constituency ===
Candidate	Party or alliance		First round		Second round	
Candidate	Party or alliance		Votes	%	Votes	%
Léa Balage El Mariky	New Popular Front	The Ecologists	24,441	46.15	25,915	53.59
Stanislas Guerini	Ensemble	Renaissance	18,001	33.99	22,444	46.41
Olga Podolskaia	National Rally		4,709	8.89		
Paul Hatte	The Republicans		4,118	7.78		
Marie Courtois	Reconquête		486	0.92		
Côme Citroën	Ecologists	Independent	433	0.82		
Laurent Burtaire	Far-left	Lutte Ouvrière	232	0.44		
Grégory Fernandes	Far-left	Independent	151	0.29		
Quentin Laporte	Miscellaneous centre	Independent	116	0.22		
Warda Baïliche	Miscellaneous centre	Independent	102	0.19		
Laurent Sémat	Miscellaneous left	Independent	92	0.17		
Thierry Alquier	Miscellaneous right	Independent	81	0.15		
Irène Gasarian	Far-left	Independent	0	0.00		
Total			52,962	100.00	48,359	100.00
Valid votes			52,962	98.70	48,359	96.03
Invalid votes			236	0.44	515	1.02
Blank votes			464	0.86	1,483	2.94
Total votes			53,662	100.00	50,357	100.00
Registered voters/turnout			73,178	73.33	73,178	68.81

=== 4th constituency ===
Candidate	Party or alliance		First round		Second round	
Candidate	Party or alliance		Votes	%	Votes	%
Astrid Panosyan-Bouvet	Ensemble	Renaissance	19,677	37.19	24,026	51.93
Geoffroy Boulard	Miscellaneous right	The Republicans	14,048	26.55	22,236	48.07
Théa Fourdrinier	New Popular Front	Miscellaneous left	9,474	17.91		
Arnaud Dassier	Union of the far right	The Republicans	8,227	15.55		
Olivier Courtois	Reconquête		1,135	2.15		
Pierre Levenard	Far-left	Lutte Ouvrière	105	0.20		
Karim Britel	Independent		99	0.19		
Lætitia Lauron	Miscellaneous left	Independent	84	0.16		
Guillaume Cardon	Independent		56	0.11		
Émile Mahieu	Far-left	Independent	0	0.00		
Total			52,905	100.00	46,262	100.00
Valid votes			52,905	99.13	46,262	96.27
Invalid votes			153	0.29	369	0.77
Blank votes			313	0.59	1,423	2.96
Total votes			53,371	100.00	48,054	100.00
Registered voters/turnout			73,204	72.91	73,204	65.64

=== 5th constituency ===
Candidate	Party or alliance		Votes	%
Pouria Amirshahi	New Popular Front	The Ecologists	32,152	54.24
Rachel-Flore Pardo	Ensemble	Renaissance	17,879	30.16
Céline Chen	National Rally		4,186	7.06
Valentine Serino	The Republicans		2,459	4.15
Thiaba Bruni	Ecologists	Independent	674	1.14
Yoneko Kikuchi	Reconquête		534	0.90
Théo Faucon	Miscellaneous centre	Union of Democrats and Independents (Note: Dissident who ran without the support of Ensemble)	511	0.86
Arnaud Borowski	Ecologists	Independent	367	0.62
Monique Dabat	Far-left	Lutte Ouvrière	271	0.46
Raymond Victor Bassil	Miscellaneous centre	Independent	133	0.22
Anne Chamayou	Volt		114	0.19
Léonard Guiot	Far-left	Independent	1	0.00
Total			59,281	100.00
Valid votes			59,281	99.02
Invalid votes			187	0.31
Blank votes			400	0.67
Total votes			59,868	100.00
Registered voters/turnout			79,451	75.35

=== 6th constituency ===
Candidate	Party or alliance		Votes	%
Sophia Chikirou	New Popular Front	La France Insoumise	34,329	58.19
Gwenaelle Coulon	Ensemble	Renaissance	13,230	22.42
Élise Maryse Laplace	National Rally		4,301	7.29
Jean-Christophe Martin	The Republicans		2,317	3.93
Louis Gundermann	Miscellaneous centre	Union of Democrats and Independents (Note: Dissident who ran without the support of Ensemble)	1,577	2.67
Hippolyte Verdier	Ecologists	Independent	1,208	2.05
Amélie Jullien	Reconquête		626	1.06
Veronique Brunet	Far-left	Lutte Ouvrière	509	0.86
Alain Jean Amouni	Independent		450	0.76
Thierry Sessin Caracci	Miscellaneous left	Independent	377	0.64
Dima Lecrest	Miscellaneous left	Independent	73	0.12
Laurence Nicolas	Far-left	Independent	0	0.00
Martial Mutte	Miscellaneous left	Independent	0	0.00
Total			58,997	100.00
Valid votes			58,997	98.34
Invalid votes			355	0.59
Blank votes			642	1.07
Total votes			59,994	100.00
Registered voters/turnout			81,237	73.85

=== 7th constituency ===
Candidate	Party or alliance		Votes	%
Emmanuel Gregoire	New Popular Front	Socialist Party	30,974	50.87
Clément Beaune	Ensemble	Renaissance	19,958	32.77
Céline Tacher	National Rally		4,815	7.91
Aurélien Véron	The Republicans		3,010	4.94
Jason Reyes	Reconquête		655	1.08
Philippe Mazuel	Miscellaneous centre	Independent	596	0.98
Sophie Lacaze	Ecologists	Independent	532	0.87
Aurélia Petit	Far-left	Lutte Ouvrière	289	0.47
Anne Grau	Volt		65	0.11
Stéphanie Blanc	Far-left	Independent	0	0.00
Total			60,894	100.00
Valid votes			60,894	99.01
Invalid votes			182	0.30
Blank votes			424	0.69
Total votes			61,500	100.00
Registered voters/turnout			80,364	76.53

=== 8th constituency ===
Candidate	Party or alliance		Votes	%
Eva Sas	New Popular Front	The Ecologists	30,923	50.73
David Ouzilou	Ensemble	Renaissance	17,305	28.39
Vanessa Vicente	National Rally		7,084	11.62
Florent Brunetti	The Republicans		3,210	5.27
Pierre-Louis Giscard d'Estaing	Miscellaneous centre	Union of Democrats and Independents (Note: Dissident who ran without the support of Ensemble)	960	1.57
Jannick Trunkenwald	Reconquête		688	1.13
Anne Bernon	Far-left	Lutte Ouvrière	317	0.52
Christine Vial Kayser	Miscellaneous centre	Independent	280	0.46
Camille Adoue	Far-left	Independent	176	0.29
Manuel Lutz	Regionalists	Independent	19	0.03
N'Cho Xavier Lawson-Agban	Miscellaneous left	Independent	0	0.00
Gwenole Selle	Far-left	Independent	0	0.00
Total			60,962	100.00
Valid votes			60,962	98.54
Invalid votes			280	0.45
Blank votes			625	1.01
Total votes			61,867	100.00
Registered voters/turnout			85,297	72.53

=== 9th constituency ===
Candidate	Party or alliance		Votes	%
Sandrine Rousseau	New Popular Front	The Ecologists	26,020	52.13
Pegah Malek-Ahmadi	Ensemble	Horizons	11,550	23.14
Marie-Josée Boulaire	National Rally		5,733	11.49
Jean-Baptiste Olivier	Miscellaneous right	The Republicans (Note: Dissident who ran without the support of the National Investiture Committee (CNI))	2,290	4.59
Elisabeth Stibbe	Miscellaneous right	The Republicans	1,495	3.00
Jade Farran	Miscellaneous centre	Union of Democrats and Independents (Note: Dissident who ran without the support of Ensemble)	678	1.36
Marion Bottou	Reconquête		611	1.22
Julian Rozenberg	Ecologists	Independent	565	1.13
Florence Jacqueline Chantal Bedague	Far-left	Lutte Ouvrière	396	0.79
Sophie Chen	Miscellaneous right	Independent	269	0.54
Blandine Chauvel	Far-left	New Anticapitalist Party (Note: Dissident who ran without the support the of New Popular Front)	251	0.50
Marc Ely	Far-right	Independent	55	0.11
Total			49,913	100.00
Valid votes			49,913	98.36
Invalid votes			263	0.52
Blank votes			570	1.12
Total votes			50,746	100.00
Registered voters/turnout			71,332	71.14

=== 10th constituency ===
Candidate	Party or alliance		Votes	%
Rodrigo Arenas	New Popular Front	La France Insoumise	25,216	50.66
Benjamin Djiane	Ensemble	Renaissance	11,918	23.94
Agnès Pageard	National Rally		5,670	11.39
Patrick Viry	The Republicans		2,965	5.96
Yann Wehrling	Ecologists	Independent	1,324	2.66
Alexia Ostyn	Miscellaneous centre	Union of Democrats and Independents (Note: Dissident who ran without the support of Ensemble)	640	1.29
Roger Bertholon	Reconquête		634	1.27
Charlotte de Vilmorin	Independent		623	1.25
Michel Goldstein	Miscellaneous centre	Independent	469	0.94
Marianne Noël	Far-left	Lutte Ouvrière	318	0.64
Camille Lebrun	Far-left	Independent	0	0.00
Total			49,777	100.00
Valid votes			49,777	98.60
Invalid votes			255	0.51
Blank votes			451	0.89
Total votes			50,483	100.00
Registered voters/turnout			70,406	71.70

=== 11th constituency ===
Candidate	Party or alliance		First round		Second round	
Candidate	Party or alliance		Votes	%	Votes	%
Céline Hervieu	New Popular Front	Socialist Party	24,195	43.70	25,213	50.58
Maud Gatel	Ensemble	Democratic Movement	19,295	34.85	24,631	49.42
Lindsay Fischer	National Rally		5,632	10.17		
Jean-François Alexandre	The Republicans		3,888	7.02		
Anne-Marie Taranne	Reconquête		749	1.35		
Julie Lasne	Ecologists	Independent	715	1.29		
Julien Vick	Miscellaneous centre	Independent	387	0.70		
Marie Camp	Miscellaneous centre	Independent	259	0.47		
Laurent Vinciguerra	Far-left	Lutte Ouvrière	223	0.40		
Iwan Clemente	Independent		25	0.05		
Rose Lavire	Far-left	Independent	0	0.00		
Total			55,368	100.00	49,844	100.00
Valid votes			55,368	98.90	49,844	96.17
Invalid votes			162	0.29	527	1.02
Blank votes			451	0.81	1,460	2.82
Total votes			55,981	100.00	51,831	100.00
Registered voters/turnout			72,872	76.82	72,872	71.13

=== 12th constituency ===
Candidate	Party or alliance		First round		Second round	
Candidate	Party or alliance		Votes	%	Votes	%
Olivia Grégoire	Ensemble	Renaissance	22,145	39.36	31,676	65.20
Céline Malaisé	New Popular Front	Communist Party	16,294	28.96	16,904	34.80
David Attia	Union of the far right	The Republicans	8,111	14.41		
Jérôme Loriau	The Republicans		7,297	12.97		
Philippe Cuignache d'Apreval	Reconquête		947	1.68		
Aliénor Billault-Harle	Ecologists	Independent	850	1.51		
Arnaud de Gontaut Biron	Miscellaneous centre	Independent	449	0.80		
Muriel Monchal	Far-left	Lutte Ouvrière	156	0.28		
Laszlo Ferréol	Miscellaneous left	Independent	19	0.03		
Joachim Mileschi	Far-left	Independent	0	0.00		
Total			56,268	100.00	48,580	100.00
Valid votes			56,268	98.96	48,580	93.76
Invalid votes			186	0.33	735	1.42
Blank votes			406	0.71	2,500	4.82
Total votes			56,860	100.00	51,815	100.00
Registered voters/turnout			75,515	75.30	75,515	68.62

=== 13th constituency ===
Candidate	Party or alliance		First round		Second round	
Candidate	Party or alliance		Votes	%	Votes	%
David Amiel	Ensemble	Renaissance	21,698	38.85	27,970	55.76
Aminata Niakate	New Popular Front	The Ecologists	20,722	37.11	22,192	44.24
Sophie Rostan	National Rally		7,818	14.00		
Frédéric Jacquot	Miscellaneous right	Independent	3,419	6.12		
Victor Chrzanowski	Reconquête		824	1.48		
Ingrid Allorant	Ecologists	Independent	811	1.45		
Annie Poupon	Regionalists	Independent	234	0.42		
Corinne Roethlisberger	Far-left	Lutte Ouvrière	226	0.40		
Anne-Laure Delinot	Far-right	Independent	85	0.15		
Corinne Paine	Sovereigntist right	Debout la France	7	0.01		
Francis Sando	Sovereigntist right	Independent	1	0.00		
Anne Oudiou	Far-left	Independent	0	0.00		
Total			55,845	100.00	50,162	100.00
Valid votes			55,845	98.68	50,162	94.44
Invalid votes			233	0.41	765	1.44
Blank votes			515	0.91	2,186	4.12
Total votes			56,593	100.00	53,113	100.00
Registered voters/turnout			77,751	72.79	77,751	68.31

=== 14th constituency ===
Candidate	Party or alliance		First round		Second round	
Candidate	Party or alliance		Votes	%	Votes	%
Benjamin Haddad	Ensemble	Renaissance	26,351	47.71	34,722	72.33
Patrick Dray	The Republicans		9,775	17.70		
Louis Piquet	Union of the far right	The Republicans	9,702	17.56	13,282	27.67
Hugo Rota	New Popular Front	La France Insoumise	7,693	13.93		
Thomas Culerrier	Reconquête		1,177	2.13		
Éric Molinari	Miscellaneous centre	Independent	414	0.75		
Marie Bourdy	Far-left	Lutte Ouvrière	123	0.22		
Sacha Élie Zaouati	Far-left	Independent	0	0.00		
Total			55,235	100.00	48,004	100.00
Valid votes			55,235	99.13	48,004	96.32
Invalid votes			144	0.26	336	0.67
Blank votes			340	0.61	1,498	3.01
Total votes			55,719	100.00	49,838	100.00
Registered voters/turnout			75,515	73.79	75,515	66.00

=== 15th constituency ===
Candidate	Party or alliance		First round		Second round	
Candidate	Party or alliance		Votes	%	Votes	%
Danielle Simonnet	Miscellaneous left	La France Insoumise (Note: Dissident who ran without the support of the New Popular Front) (Note: Following the election, him and other LFI dissidents would form a new party, L'Après)	23,103	41.87	28,858	74.19
Céline Verzeletti	New Popular Front	La France Insoumise	12,619	22.87	10,039	25.81
Mohamad Gassama	Ensemble	Renaissance	8,948	16.22		
Clotilde Guéry	National Rally		4,969	9.01		
François-Marie Didier	The Republicans		1,968	3.57		
Philippe Aragon	Miscellaneous centre	Independent	1,634	2.96		
Aliou Pourchet	Miscellaneous centre	Independent	943	1.71		
Christian Guillot	Reconquête		558	1.01		
Arnaud Charvillat	Far-left	Lutte Ouvrière	275	0.50		
Pierre Augros	Far-left	Independent	128	0.23		
Laurent Chrétien-Marquet	Independent		32	0.06		
Audrey Lepage	Sovereigntist right	Independent	0	0.00		
Total			55,177	100.00	38,897	100.00
Valid votes			55,177	98.37	38,897	87.14
Invalid votes			312	0.56	1,251	2.80
Blank votes			605	1.08	4,491	10.06
Total votes			56,094	100.00	44,639	100.00
Registered voters/turnout			79,598	70.47	79,598	56.08

=== 16th constituency ===
Candidate	Party or alliance		Votes	%
Sarah Legrain	New Popular Front	La France Insoumise	32,422	62.47
Elsa Pariente	Ensemble	Renaissance	10,154	19.56
Christèle de Fromont de Bouaille	National Rally		4,829	9.30
Marie Toubiana	The Republicans		2,291	4.41
Victor Huguet	Ecologists	Union of Democrats and Independents (Note: Dissident who ran without the support of Ensemble)	1,003	1.93
Cécile Fischer	Reconquête		506	0.97
Nordine El-Marbati	Far-left	Lutte Ouvrière	409	0.79
Marie-Noëlle Blondel	Miscellaneous centre	Independent	287	0.55
Hakima Khelfa	Independent		1	0.00
Hortense Villenave	Far-left	Independent	0	0.00
Total			51,902	100.00
Valid votes			51,902	98.46
Invalid votes			296	0.56
Blank votes			516	0.98
Total votes			52,714	100.00
Registered voters/turnout			76,417	68.98

=== 17th constituency ===
Candidate	Party or alliance		Votes	%
Danièle Obono	New Popular Front	La France Insoumise	26,238	64.23
Kolia Bénié	Ensemble	Renaissance	7,012	17.16
Anne de la Brélie	National Rally		3,666	8.97
Angélique Michel	The Republicans		1,619	3.96
Mathias Saint-Ellier	Miscellaneous centre	Union of Democrats and Independents (Note: Dissident who ran without the support of Ensemble)	744	1.82
Michel Bouchou	Ecologists	Independent	578	1.41
Brigitte Rumeau	Reconquête		414	1.01
Abdellah Aksas	Far-left	Lutte Ouvrière	399	0.98
Victor Fournier	Miscellaneous centre	Independent	181	0.44
Clément Rousseau	Far-left	Independent	0	0.00
Marie-Agnès Vallée	Sovereigntist right	Debout la France	0	0.00
Total			40,851	100.00
Valid votes			40,851	98.20
Invalid votes			281	0.68
Blank votes			466	1.12
Total votes			41,598	100.00
Registered voters/turnout			63,138	65.88

=== 18th constituency ===
Candidate	Party or alliance		Votes	%
Aymeric Caron	New Popular Front	Ecological Revolution for the Living	26,299	50.38
Pierre-Yves Bournazel	Ensemble	Horizons	16,902	32.38
Valérie Tirefort	National Rally		3,641	6.98
Rudolph Granier	The Republicans		2,184	4.18
Catherine Coutard	Miscellaneous left	Independent	811	1.55
Philippine Long	Miscellaneous centre	Union of Democrats and Independents (Note: Dissident who ran without the support of Ensemble)	804	1.54
Pierre Bravoz	Miscellaneous left	Independent	742	1.42
Marguerite Pierre	Reconquête		527	1.01
Annie Boubault	Far-left	Lutte Ouvrière	214	0.41
Audrey Le Bœuf	Volt		68	0.13
David Thiele	Far-left	Independent	8	0.02
Béatrice Faillès	Miscellaneous centre	Independent	0	0.00
Stéphane Manigold	Miscellaneous centre	Independent	0	0.00
Yasmin Berrouba	Miscellaneous centre	Independent	0	0.00
Total			52,200	100.00
Valid votes			52,200	98.79
Invalid votes			223	0.42
Blank votes			414	0.78
Total votes			52,837	100.00
Registered voters/turnout			70,320	75.14
