= Nitot =

Nitot is a surname. Notable people with the surname include:

- Marie-Etienne Nitot (1750–1809), French jeweller and founder of the House of Chaumet
- Tristan Nitot (born 1966), former president of Mozilla Europe
