= Myriam El Khomri =

French politician

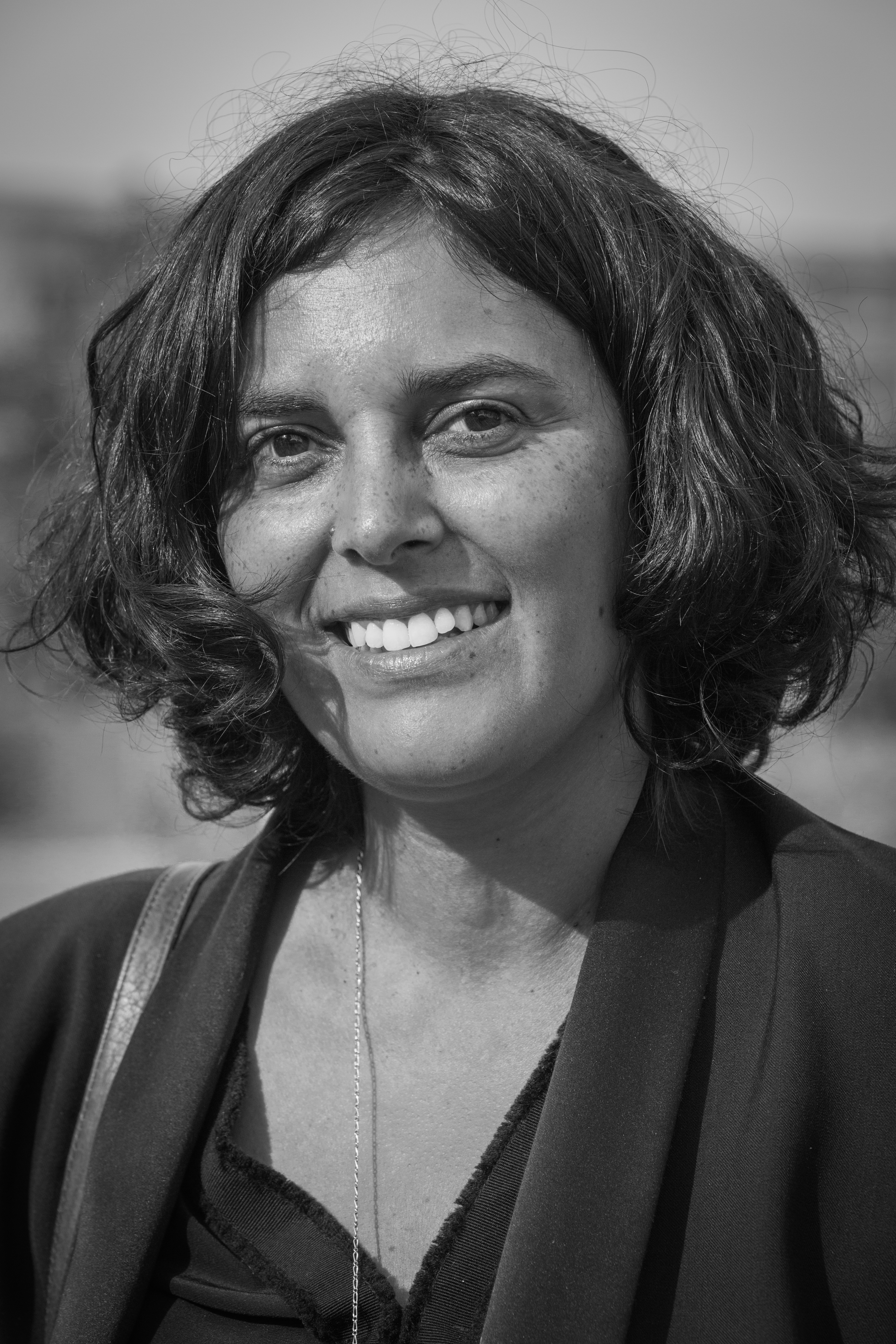

Councillor of Paris
- In office 8 April 2008 – 11 July 2020
- Constituency: 18th arrondissement

Minister of Labour, Employment, Vocational Training and Social Dialogue
- In office 2 September 2015 – 10 May 2017
- Prime Minister: Manuel Valls; Bernard Cazeneuve
- Preceded by: François Rebsamen
- Succeeded by: Muriel Pénicaud

State Secretary for City Policy
- In office 26 August 2014 – 2 September 2015
- Prime Minister: Manuel Valls
- Preceded by: Najat Vallaud-Belkacem
- Succeeded by: Hélène Geoffroy

Personal details
- Born: 18 February 1978 (age 48) Rabat, Morocco
- Party: Socialist Party
- Education: University of Bordeaux; Pantheon-Sorbonne University

Myriam El Khomri (born 18 February 1978) is a former French politician of the Socialist Party (PS) who served as Minister of Labour in the government of Prime Minister Manuel Valls from 2015 to 2017.

== Early life and education ==
El Khomri was born on 18 February 1978 in Rabat. Her father is Moroccan and her mother is from Brittany. Until the age of nine, she lived in Tangier. She then moved with her family to Thouars and then to Mérignac.

In 1995, El Khomri studied public law at the Montesquieu University. She financed her studies with scholarships and holding several jobs. In 1999, she moved to Paris and continued her law studies at Pantheon-Sorbonne University, where she obtained a specialized graduate diploma (DESS) in political science (political administration) in 2001.

== Political career ==
=== Career in local politics ===
In March 2008, El Khomri was elected as a councillor in the 18th arrondissement of Paris, on the Daniel Vaillant-Bertrand Delanoë's list. She has since been a member of the Council of Paris and from 2008 to 2011, deputy mayor, in charge of all questions relating to child protection and specialized prevention, then from February 18, 2011, to August 27, 2014, date of her entry into government, deputy mayor responsible for all matters relating to prevention and security.

On April 21, 2008, El Khomri was appointed representative of the Council of Paris on the board of directors of the social action center of the City of Paris and then on May 10, 2008, on the supervisory board of the Bullion Pediatrics and Rehabilitation Hospital and on May 26, 2008, to the pupil surveillance committee of the City of Paris.

El Khomri supported Martine Aubry during the socialist presidential primary in 2011. During the legislative elections of 2012, she was the substitute for Christophe Caresche, deputy for the 18th constituency of Paris.

During the 2014 municipal election campaign in Paris, El Khomri was one of Anne Hidalgo's spokespersons. Approached by the latter to take over from Daniel Vaillant as mayor of the 18th arrondissement of Paris, the outgoing mayor preferred Éric Lejoindre. She was reappointed as deputy mayor.

=== Secretary of State for the City ===
El Khomri was appointed, from August 26, 2014, Secretary of State for City Policy under Minister of the city, Youth and Sports Patrick Kanner in the second government of Prime Minister Manuel Valls.

The policy having been defined by the law constructed by François Lamy in the Ayrault government, El Khomri focused on communications. She made its first public appearance in Nantes on September 7, 2014, on the occasion of the foundation of the collective "Pas sans nous", coordination of groups of working-class neighborhoods and then increased travel in the field, especially in municipalities run by the National Front.

=== Minister of Labour ===
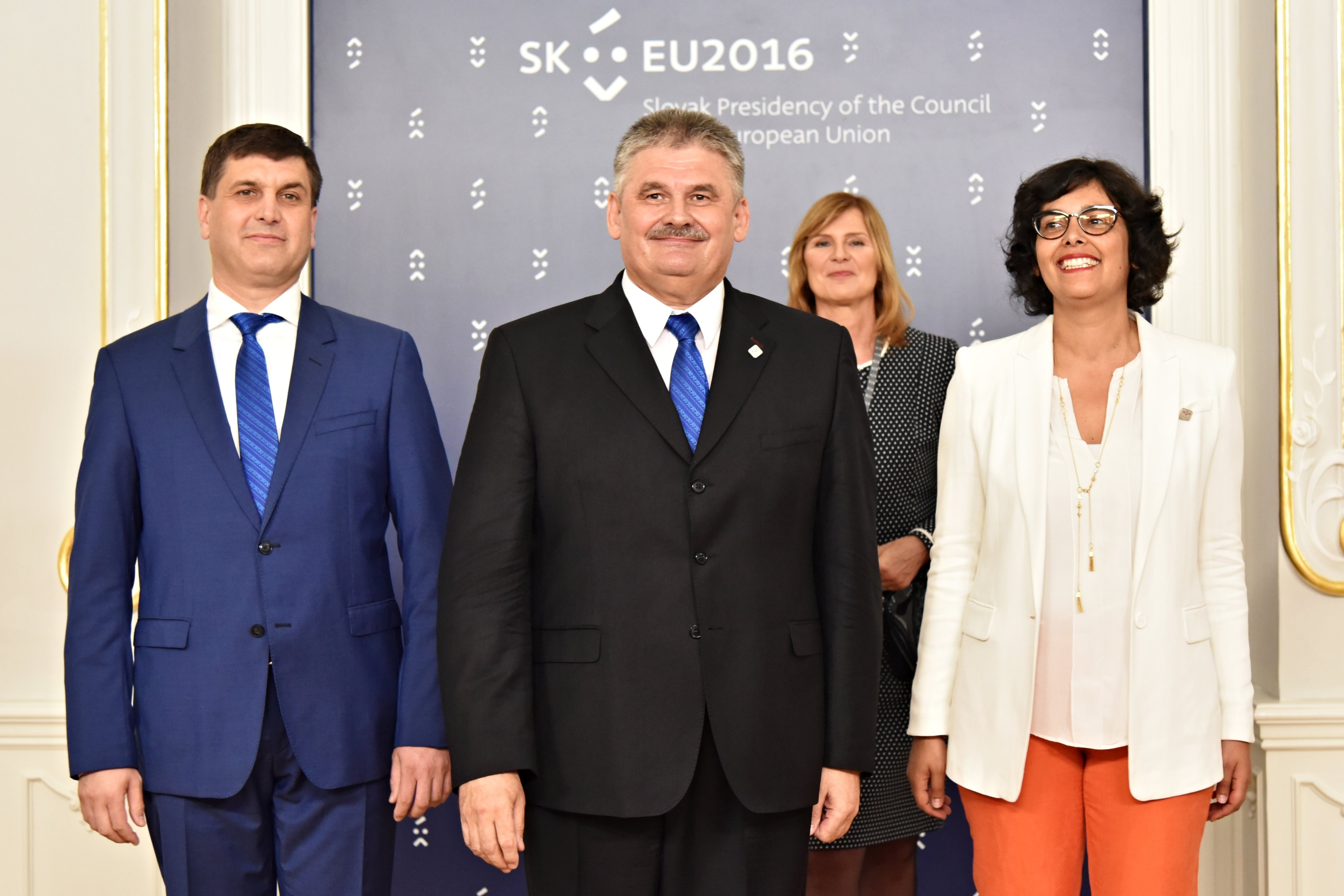
Myriam El Khomri in 2016

On September 2, 2015, El Khomri was appointed Minister of Labor, Employment, Vocational Training and Social Dialogue, after the resignation of François Rebsamen. Her appointment increased the contingent of women in the cabinet to a majority for the first time in the country's history. As when she was appointed to the Secretary of State for the city, El Khomri was the subject of critical comments, sometimes racist and sexist, on social networks.

In her capacity as minister, El Khomri commissioned a study in 2015 that warned about the dangers of “info-obesity,” suggesting that using a smartphone to check work emails at all hours of the day can cause burnout, sleeplessness and relationship problems.

Most notably, El Khomri was responsible for presenting at the beginning of 2016 a controversial bill reforming the legislation relating to work, with in particular a flexibilisation of working time, the bases of the future personal activity account, measures on occupational medicine and provisions on the restructuring of professional branches. She planned to include provisions to protect self-employed workers on collaborative platforms like Uber. The law sparked strike action led by Philippe Martinez and others, with much of the anger targeted at El Khomri. In 2016, the French cabinet gave Prime Minister Valls permission to bypass parliament and enact a sweeping set of labour reforms known widely as the El Khomri law. Later that year, El Khomri announced that the number of people out of work in France had fallen to the lowest point in almost four years.

On December 8, 2016, El Khomri was chosen by the PS's members as candidate for the 2017 legislative elections in the 18th constituency of Paris. Ahead of the party's 2017 primaries, she endorsed Manuel Valls as the Socialists' candidate for the presidential election later that year. She eventually called on her supporters to vote for Emmanuel Macron in the second round. In return, Macron's La République En Marche! did not field a candidate to challenge her in the legislative elections. She announced that she wanted to carry the values of the left within the presidential majority and faced Pierre-Yves Bournazel, LR's candidate, who also said he supported the presidential majority. She was beaten at the end of the second round, with 53.6% against 46.4%.

== Life after politics ==
After leaving government, El Khomri moved to consulting by creating in November 2017 a business consultancy, MEK Conseil. In May 2018, she also became a senior advisor to Lee Hecht Harrison Altedia, and in March 2019, she joined the insurance brokerage group Siaci Saint Honoré as director of the consulting division at its consulting and strategy subsidiary S2H Consulting.

In March 2018, El Khomri performed with Roselyne Bachelot and Marlène Schiappa a representation of The Vagina Monologues at the Bobino theater. The profits of the show went to the Feminist Collective against rape.

In July 2019, the Minister of Solidarity and Health Agnès Buzyn appointed El Khomri to head a mission on the attractiveness of professions in the elderly, with the aim of combating the shortage of personnel in this sector.

== Other activities ==
- Nexity, Member of the Board of Directors (since 2021)
