= Institution Notre-Dame de Sainte-Croix =

Private Catholic school in Paris

Coordinates: 48°53′19.631″N 2°16′41.131″E

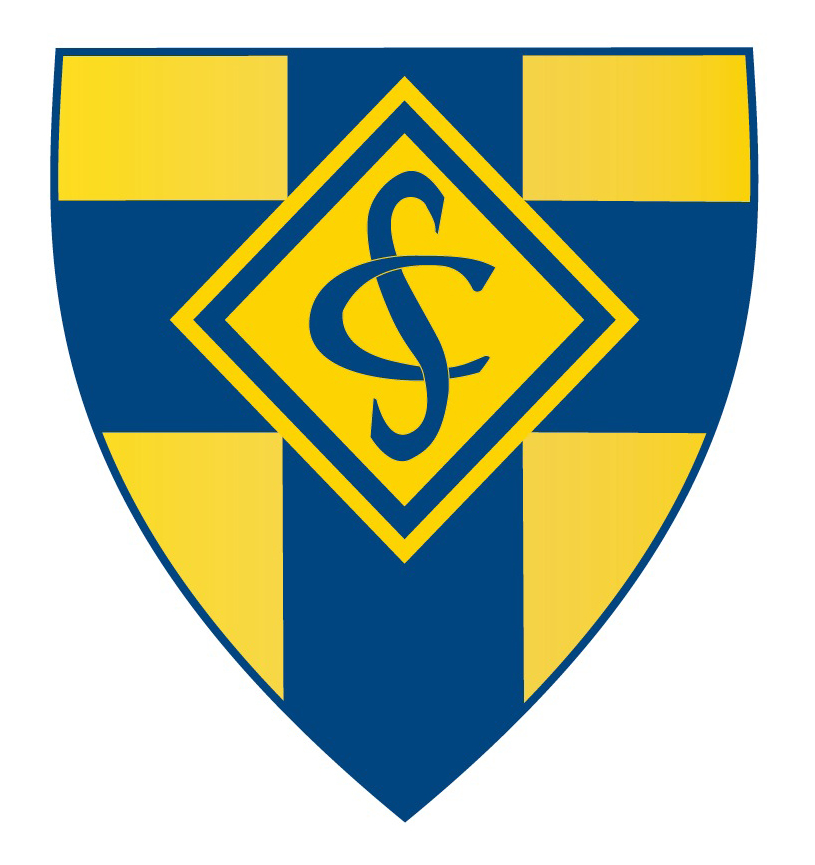

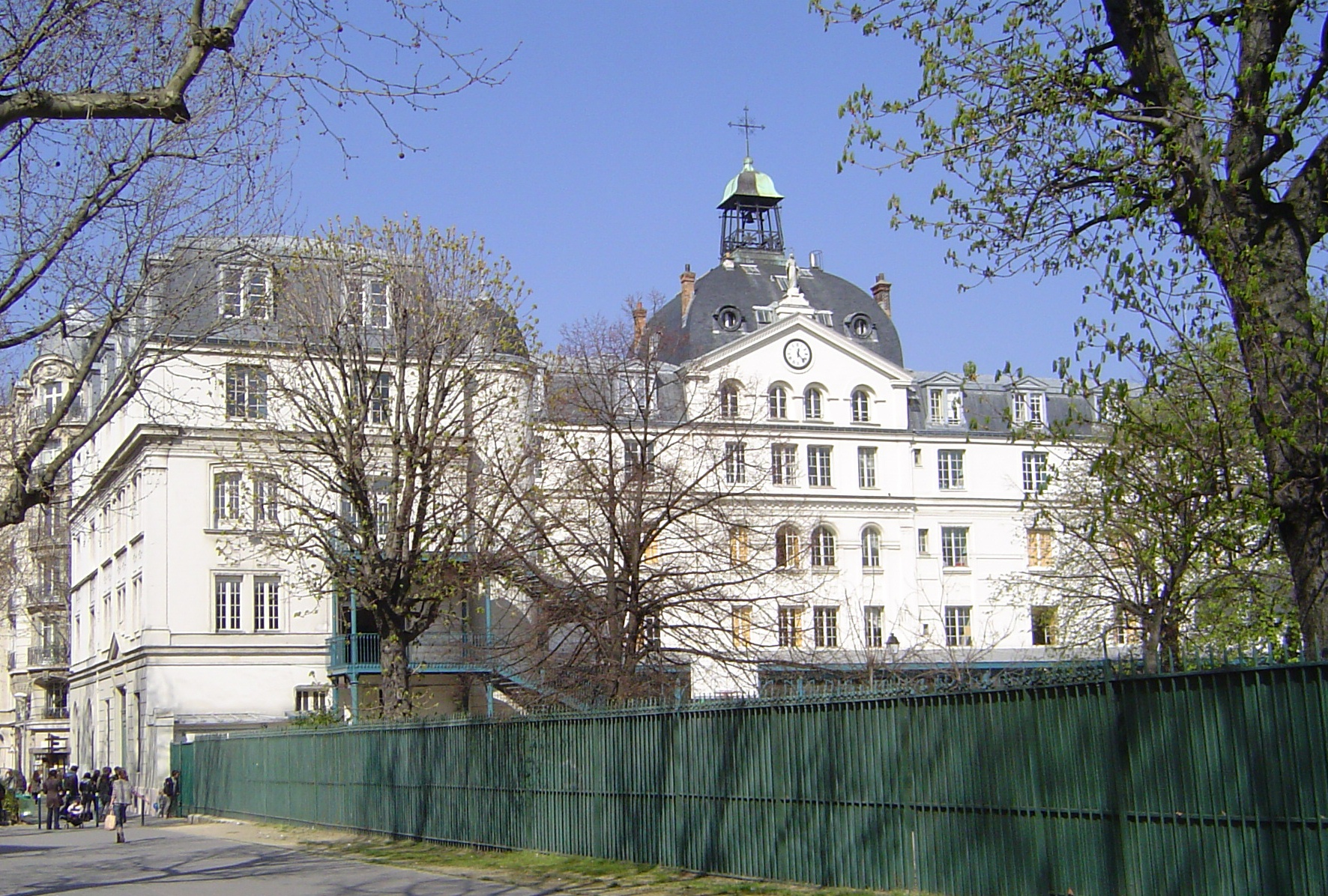
- 30 Avenue du Roule; 92200 Neuilly-sur-Seine; France

Information
- Established: 1856
- Principal: Dominique de Chermont

The Institution Notre-Dame de Sainte-Croix, often called Sainte-Croix de Neuilly, is a Roman Catholic educational institution under contract with the State, located in Neuilly-sur-Seine in the Hauts-de-Seine department in France.

== History ==
Founded in 1856 at the Château des Ternes by the Congregation of Holy Cross, the establishment was transferred to its present location in 1866.

The national ranking of classes préparatoires aux grandes écoles (CPGE) is based on the admission rate of students to the grandes écoles.

In 2021, 31.50% of the class entered the top 3 (HEC, ESSEC, ESCP) and 80.3% the top 6, thus confirming the progression of previous years.

== Notable alumni ==
- Alain Daniélou, French historian, Indologist, intellectual, musicologist, translator, writer, and notable Western convert to and expert on the Shaivite sect of Hinduism
- Bertrand Le Gendre, French journalist and essayist
- Bernard Lefort, French lyric baritone, and later an opera director
- François Polgár, contemporary French choral conductor, organist, composer and musicologist
- Étienne Vatelot, French luthier

== Gallery ==
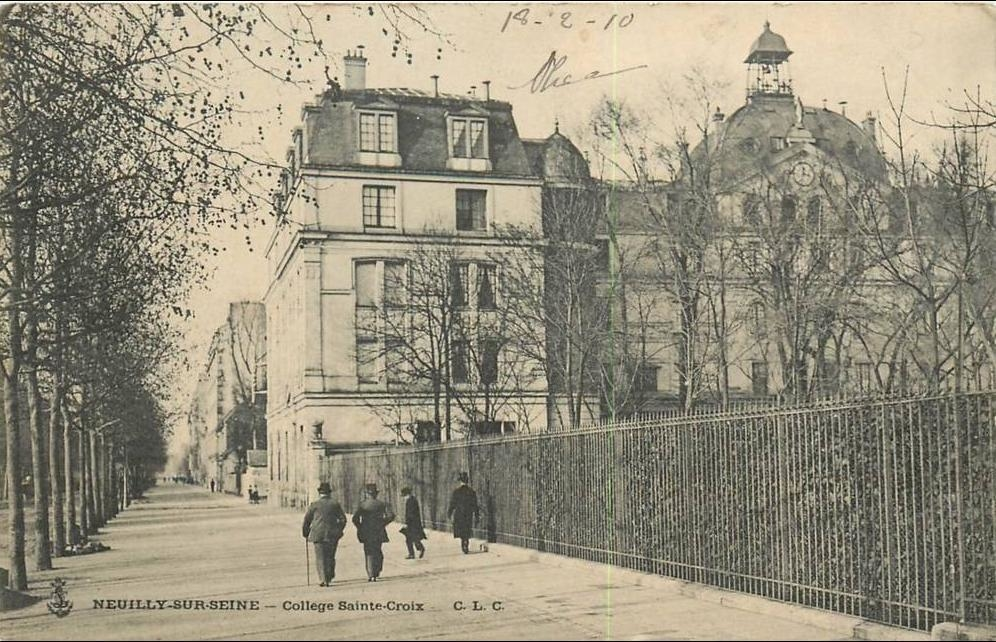
The institution on a postcard

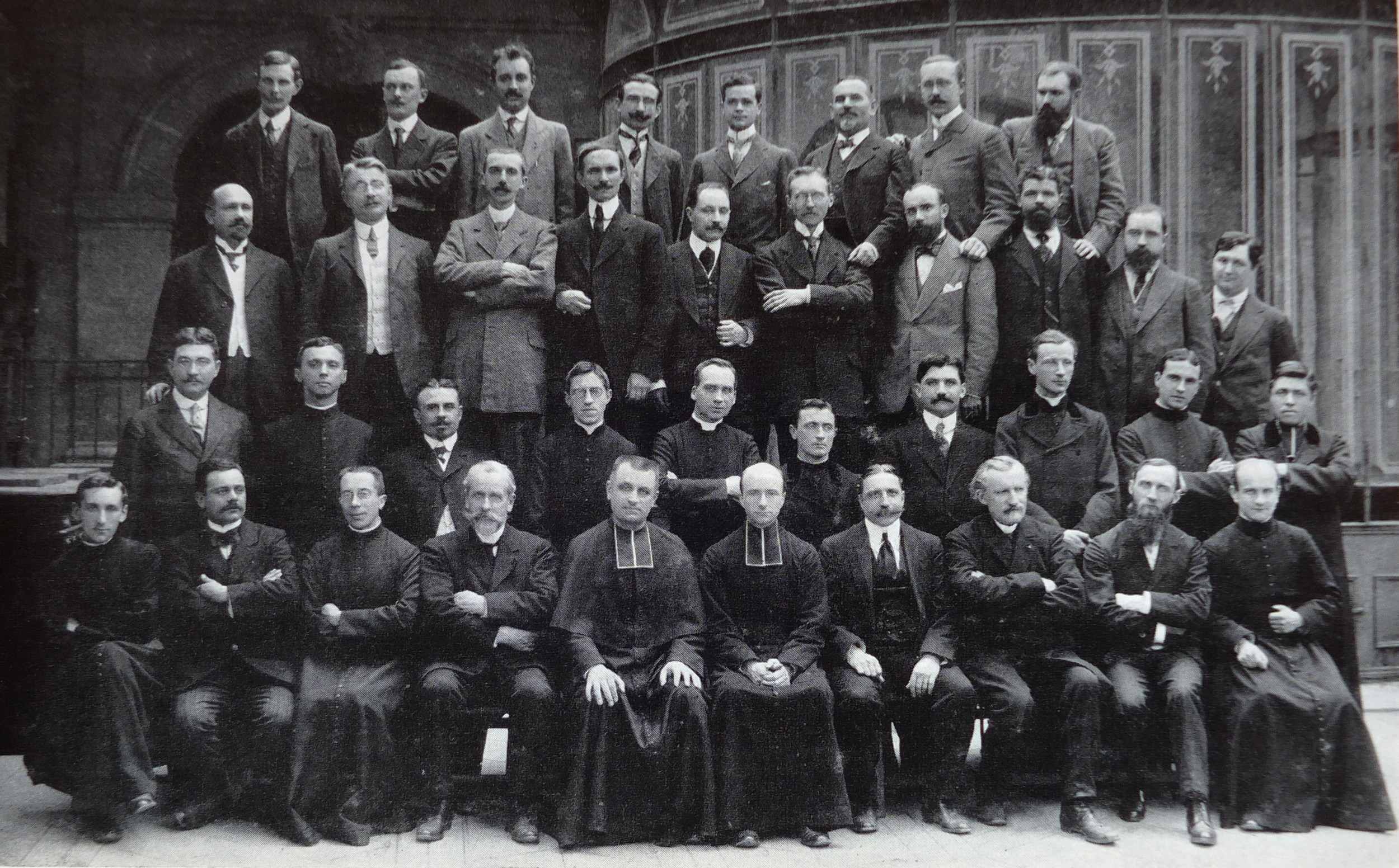
Sainte-Croix Professors in 1912

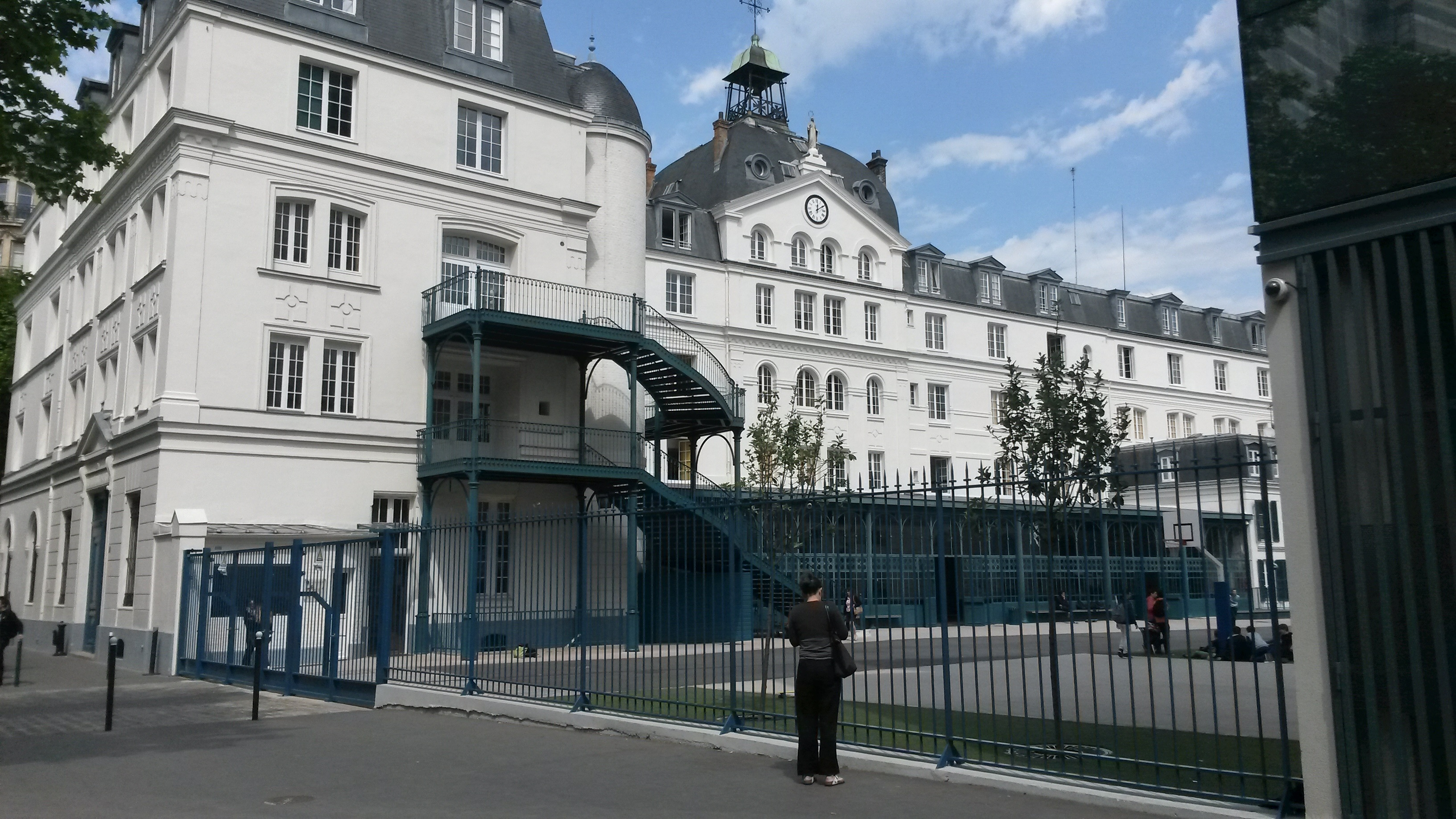
The institution in 2015

== See also ==
- Catholic Church in France
- Education in France
- List of schools in France
