= Bertrand Le Gendre =

French journalist and essayist

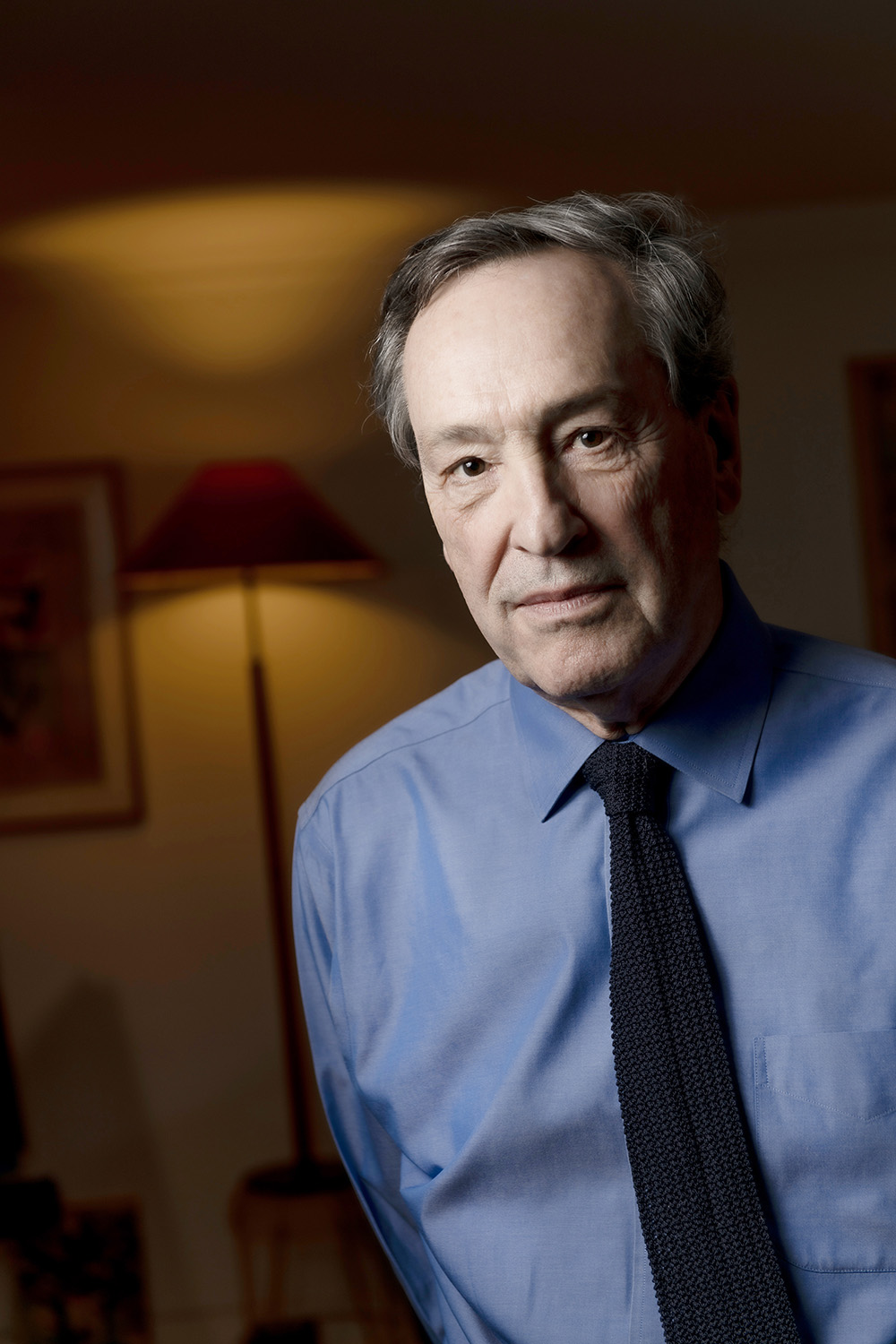
Bertrand Le Gendre, Paris, France January 2021

Bertrand Le Gendre (born 25 February 1948, in Neuilly-sur-Seine) is a French journalist and essayist.

== Studies ==
Private school Institution Notre-Dame de Sainte-Croix (Neuilly-sur-Seine), Institute of Political Studies in Paris, law and sociology degrees (Paris University)

== Career ==
- Journalist in Le Monde: editor in the Education headline (1974-1979), editor then assistant head in the department of General Informations (1979-1983), head of the Justice column (1983-1987), international reporter (1987-1992), Chief Editor (1993-2006), editorialist (2006-2011)
- Visiting Professor at Panthéon-Assas University (2000-2011)
- Head (with Edwy Plenel) of "The Topical subject" collection for Gallimard Publisher (1986-1989)
- Presenter (with Marc Ferro) of the weekly program "From Current Events to History" on the History Channel (1997-1999)

== Published works ==
- 1962, the fantastic year (Denoël, Paris, 2012) ISBN 978-2-207-11161-1
- Confessions of the n° 2 of the OAS. Talks with Jean-Jacques Susini (Les Arènes, Paris, 2012) ISBN 978-2-35204-188-7
- Flaubert (Perrin Publisher, "Selfportraits" collection, Paris, 2013) ISBN 978-2-262-03921-9
- The War of Algeria, the clash of memories (collaboration) (Le Monde, "World History : How to understand a changing world" collection, Paris, 2013) ISBN 978-2-36156-103-1
- De Gaulle, From Rebel to Head of State (collaboration) (Le Monde, "World History: They changed the world" collection, Paris, 2014) ISBN 978-2-36156-186-4
- Kennedy, The Man, the President, the Myth (collaboration) (Le Monde, "World History: They changed the world" collection, Paris, 2015) ISBN 978-2-36156-192-5
- De Gaulle and Mauriac. The Forgotten Dialogue (Fayard, Paris, 2015) ISBN 978-2-213-67215-1
- Bourguiba, (Fayard, Paris, 2019) ISBN 978-2-213-70038-0
- Crimes et abus sexuels dans l'Eglise. Le cas du curé d'Uruffe. Ce que disent les archives (Amazon Kindle, 2021) ISBN 978-2-9580075-0-8
- Enver Hoxha. Albanie, les années rouges (1944-1991) ( Flammarion Publishing , Paris, 2024) ISBN 978-2-0804-3291-9
- Farouk, le dernier roi d'Egypte (1936-1952) ( Flammarion Publishing , Paris, 2026) ISBN 978-2-0804-7358-5
