= Pierre-Yves Bournazel =

French politician (born 1977)

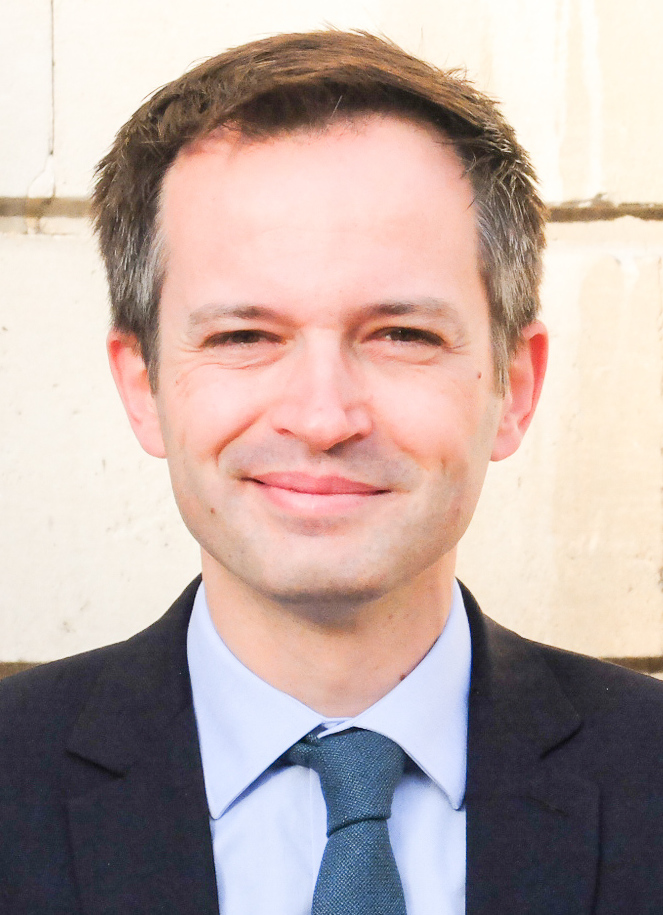
- Pierre-Yves Bournazel in 2019

Councillor of Paris
- In office 18 March 2008 – 29 March 2026
- Mayor: Bertrand Delanoë; Anne Hidalgo
- Constituency: 18th arrondissement

Member of the Regional Council of Île-de-France
- In office 26 March 2010 – 4 July 2017
- President: Jean-Paul Huchon; Valérie Pécresse

Member of the National Assembly for Paris's 18th constituency
- In office 21 June 2017 – 21 June 2022
- Preceded by: Christophe Caresche
- Succeeded by: Aymeric Caron

Personal details
- Born: 31 August 1977 (age 49) Riom-ès-Montagnes, Cantal, France
- Party: Horizons (2021–present)
- Other political affiliations: Union for a Popular Movement (until 2015); The Republicans (2015–2017); Agir (2017–2022)
- Education: Institut d'études politiques de Toulouse

Pierre-Yves Bournazel (born 31 August 1977) is a French politician who represented the 18th constituency of Paris in the National Assembly from 2017 to 2022. He has been a member of Horizons since 2021, which he joined after leaving The Republicans (LR) in 2017. Bournazel has also held a seat on the Council of Paris from 2008 to 2026.

== Political career ==
=== Career in local politics ===
Upon Françoise de Panafieu's selection as the Union for a Popular Movement (UMP) candidate for the 2008 Paris municipal election, Bournazel became her political advisor and later one of her two spokespersons – along with Jean-François Lamour – during the election campaign. Ahead of the 2014 municipal election, he placed third in the UMP primary election won by Nathalie Kosciusko-Morizet.

In 2010, he was elected to the Regional Council of Île-de-France, where he sat in opposition. He was reelected in 2015 on the list led by Valérie Pécresse, which won a clear majority of seats and ended the Socialist majority first won in 1998. Bournazel sat as a regional councillor until he resigned in 2017 following his election to the National Assembly.

=== Career in national politics ===
Bournazel supported Alain Juppé in the 2016 The Republicans presidential primary. Amid the Fillon affair, he announced that he would no longer support The Republicans' campaign.

In the 2017 legislative election, Bournazel was elected to the National Assembly in the 18th constituency of Paris, winning against former Labour Minister Myriam El Khomri of the Socialist Party. He had previously run for the seat in 2012, but was defeated by incumbent Socialist Christophe Caresche. In Parliament, he served on the Committee on Cultural Affairs and Education.

In November 2017, Bournazel joined the new Agir party.

Bournazel announced that he would run in the 2020 Paris municipal election as an independent candidate. He renounced his candidacy on 16 January 2020; instead he became the campaign spokesman of La République En Marche! nominee Agnès Buzyn.

In the 2022 legislative election, Bournazel ran for a second term in the National Assembly, but was defeated by Aymeric Caron of the Ecological Revolution for the Living (REV) under the New Ecological and Social People's Union (NUPES) coalition.

== Other activities ==
- Centre Pompidou, Member of the Board of Directors
