= Aymeric Caron =

French politician and former radio and television journalist

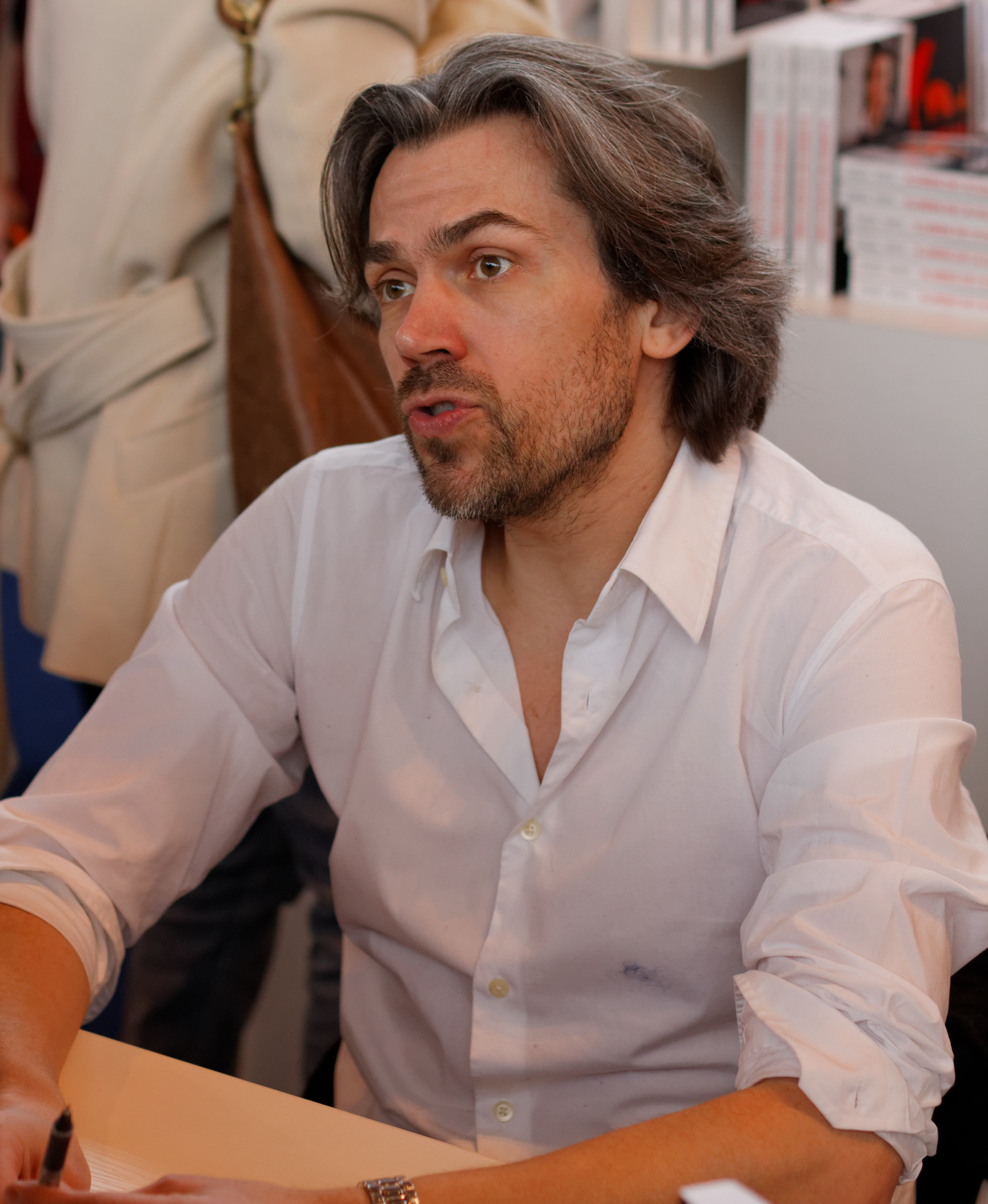
- Caron in 2013

Member of the National Assembly for Paris's 18th constituency
- Incumbent
- Assumed office 22 June 2022
- Preceded by: Pierre-Yves Bournazel

Personal details
- Born: 4 December 1971 (age 54) Boulogne-sur-Mer, France
- Party: Ecological Revolution for the Living (2018–present)
- Education: ESJ Lille; University of Lille
- Profession: Journalist • Politician

Aymeric Caron (French pronunciation: [ɛmʁik kaʁɔ̃]; born 4 December 1971) is a French politician and former radio and television journalist who has represented the 18th constituency of Paris in the National Assembly since 2022. He was elected as a member of the Ecological Revolution for the Living (REV) within the New Ecological and Social People's Union (NUPES) alliance. As the party's sole Member of Parliament, Caron sits with the La France Insoumise group.

== Early life and education ==
Caron is the son of a teacher and primary school director and a nurse mother. He first thought about becoming a cartoonist, but after having seen a war reporter, he found his vocation of journalist. He studied a Classe préparatoire lettres et sciences sociales (literature and social science) at the Lycée Faidherbe in Lille and then graduated at the École supérieure de journalisme de Lille in May 1995. He then left France to work in Shanghai in a studio of radiophonic production of the French consulate. He came back in France working for the channels TF1, LCI and France 3.

== Television career ==
In 1998, he joined Canal+ working as a journalist. He is in charge by the redaction of the channel, to cover different conflicts like those from Kosovo, Afghanistan, Ivory Coast, Congo and Iraq. With several journalists, he joined the team of the news information during the fusion of the redaction from the channels Canal+ and I-Télé in June 2001. He also replaced some presenters during their vacation period.

From March 2006 to June 2008, Aymeric Caron hosts from Friday to Sunday the morning news of the weekend on I-Télé. He presents at the same time Matin infos, a morning program common to Canal+ and I-Télé, during summer 2006 and 2007. Matin Week-end is a news segment alternating reportages, chronicles and interviews. In October 2007, one of his interviews strongly opposed him to Nadine Morano, who was the official spokesperson of the French UMP, close of President Nicolas Sarkozy. He then left the channel at the end of the season in 2008.

In September 2012, he joined the program On n'est pas couché presented by Laurent Ruquier broadcast every Saturday at the second part of the evening on France 2. He replaces Audrey Pulvar as a columnist with Natacha Polony. He often has violent confrontations with his guests including Tristane Banon and Véronique Genest. In May 2014, during a confrontation with Alexandre Arcady, cut at the montage by the production of the program, about his last film 24 Days, there were multiple critics and Aymeric Caron was even accused of antisemitism.

In September 2014, after a confrontation with Bernard-Henri Lévy about the 2014 Israel-Gaza conflict on the same program, Aymeric Caron apparently received threats that were serious enough for the Paris Police Prefecture to reinforce the patrol around his home. In September 2015, he was replaced by Yann Moix who is now a polemicist on the program.

== Radio career ==
During summer 2009, he presented the morning section of Europe 1 from Monday to Friday, replacing Marc-Olivier Fogiel. In September 2009, the direction of the station put him in charge of the presentation of the morning section on weekends. He was then replaced in September 2010 for the morning section to present on Sunday evening. He was also the substitute presenter of Jean-Marc Morandini on Le Grand Direct and Le Grand Direct des Médias from Monday to Friday. In February 2001, she presented again the morning section on weekends, and left the station in July 2011.

== Animal rights activism ==
A fervent defender of animal rights, Aymeric Caron has been a vegetarian since the 1990s. In 2013, he published a book about this engagement titled No Steak, with sales of more than 30,000 copies. In late 2014, he announced that he had become vegan.

In July 2015, he participated at Fort Boyard on France 2 with Damien Thévenot, Gérard Vivès, Carinne Teyssandier, Laurent Maistret et Hélène Gateau. They earned 12,690 euros for the association L214.

He has participated in press conferences about animal causes with Peter Singer, Matthieu Ricard and Franz-Olivier Giesbert. During a press conference at the National Assembly in October 2015, he supported the proposition for a law of deputy Yves Jégo from the Union of Democrats and Independents, among others, Cécile Duflot and Chantal Jouanno, also favorable for a vegetarian alternative in school canteens.

== Bibliography ==
- Envoyé spécial à Bagdad pendant la guerre, mars-avril 2003. Éditions L'Harmattan. 2003. p. 246. ISBN 9782747552455.
- No steak. Paris: Éditions Fayard. 2013. p. 360. ISBN 9782213661537. Caron2013.
- Incorrect : pire que la gauche bobo, la droite bobards. Éditions Fayard. 2014.
- Envoyé spécial. Hachette Pluriel Référence. 2014.
- Antispéciste : réconcilier l'humain, l'animal, la nature. Éditions Don Quichotte. 2016. ISBN 978-2-35949-498-3. Caron2016.
