= ESCP Business School =

European business school

Coordinates: 48°51′51.84″N 2°22′50.84″E

- École Supérieure de Commerce de Paris; Upper Business School of Paris
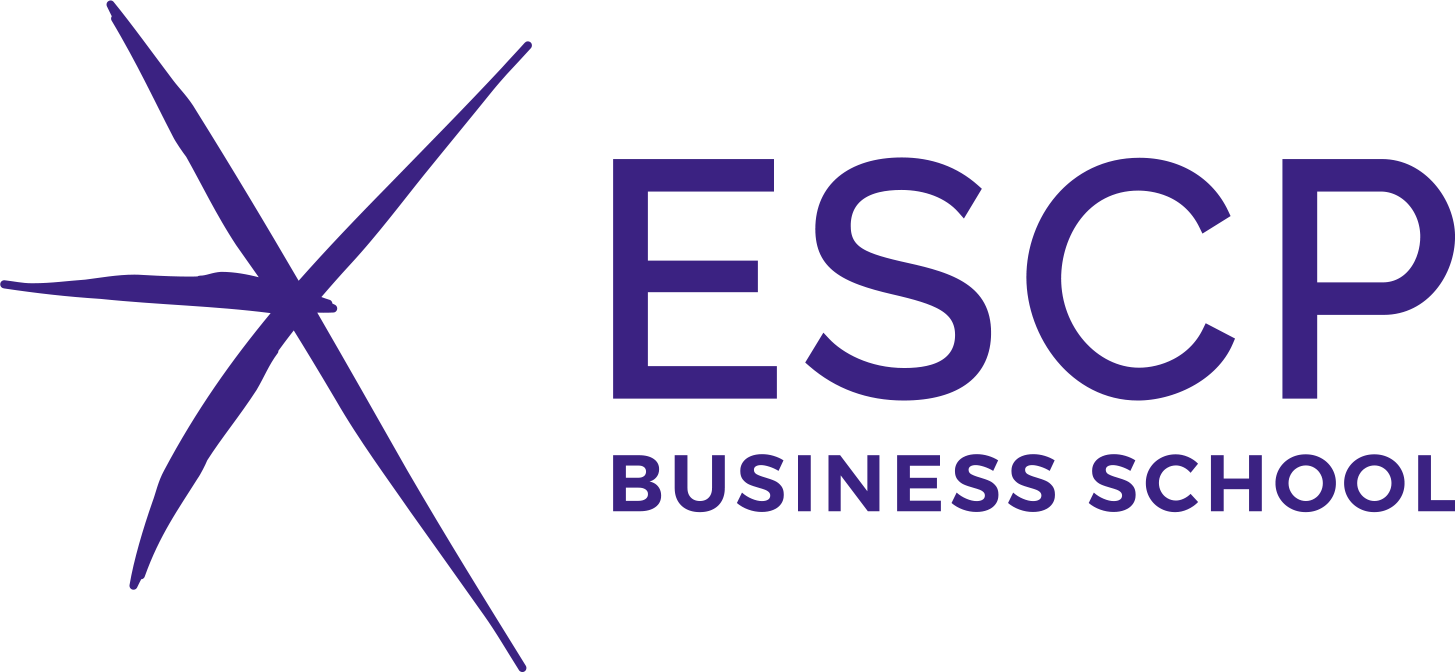
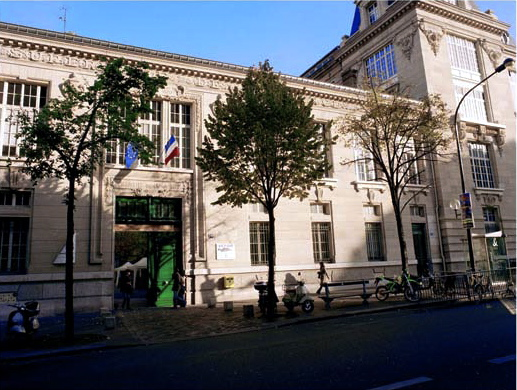
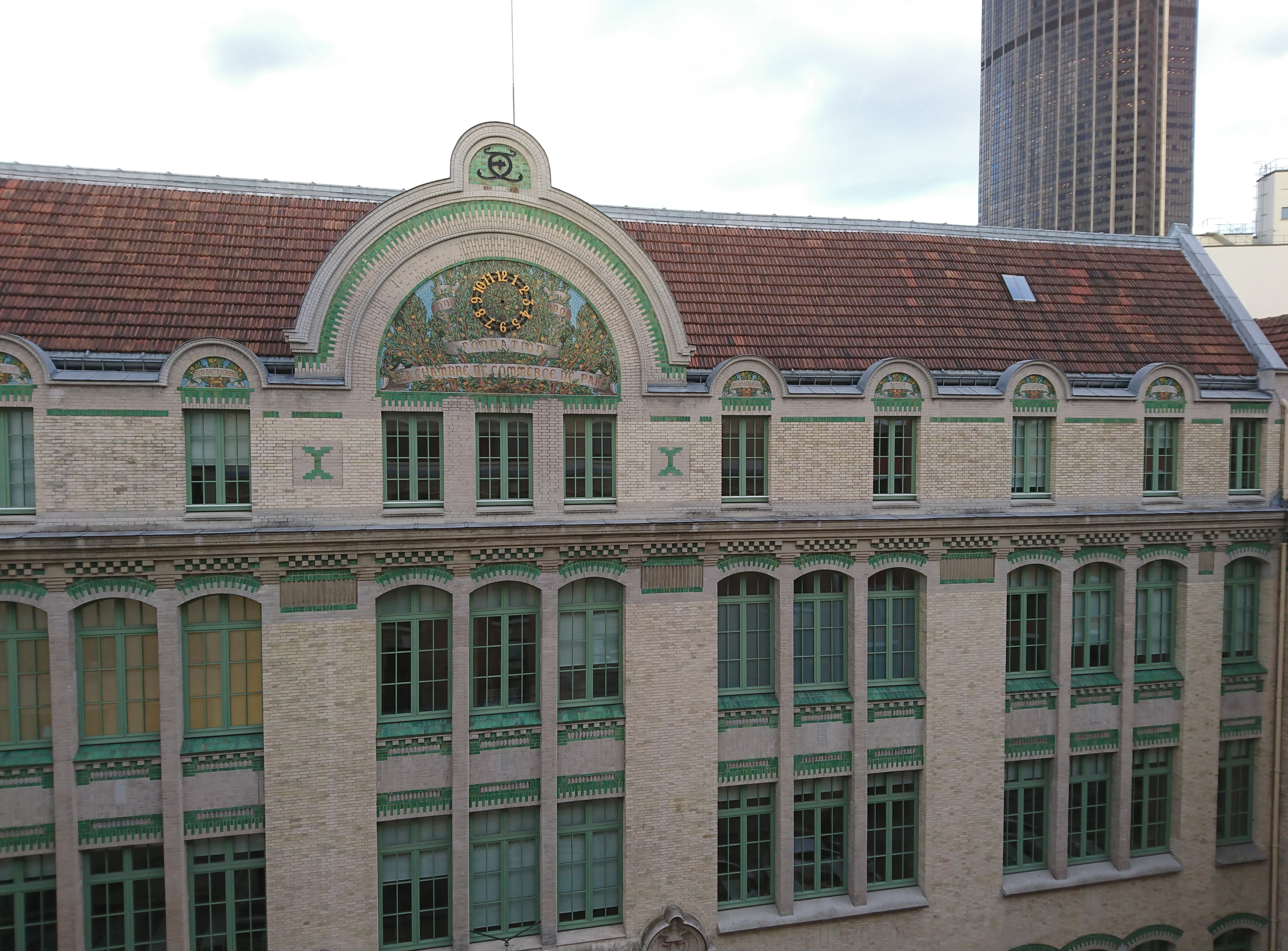
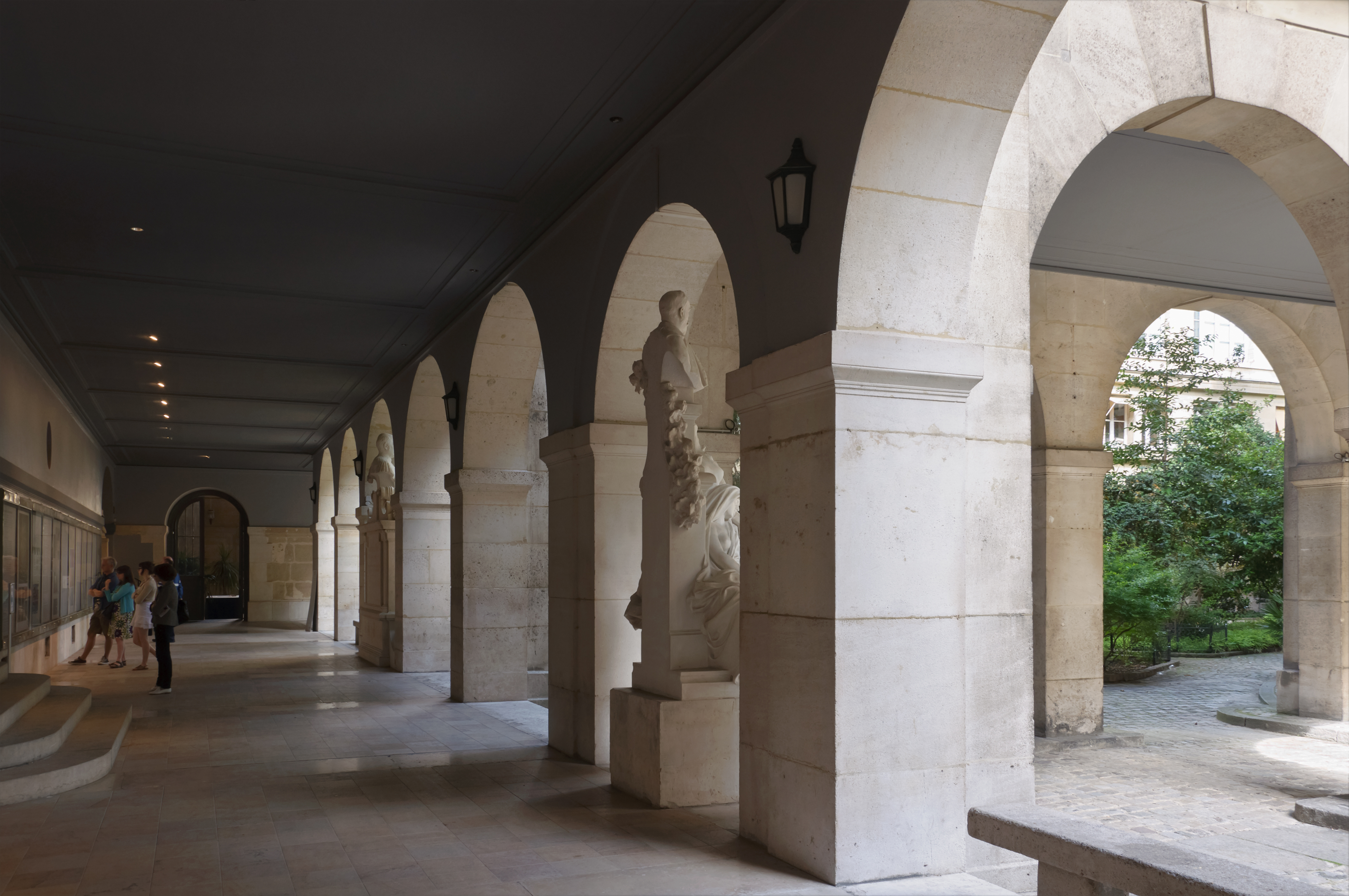
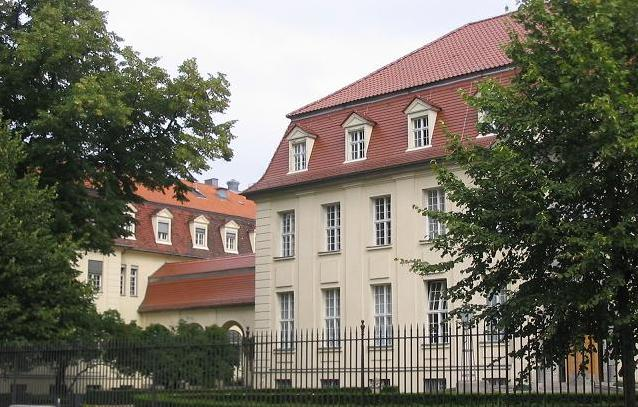
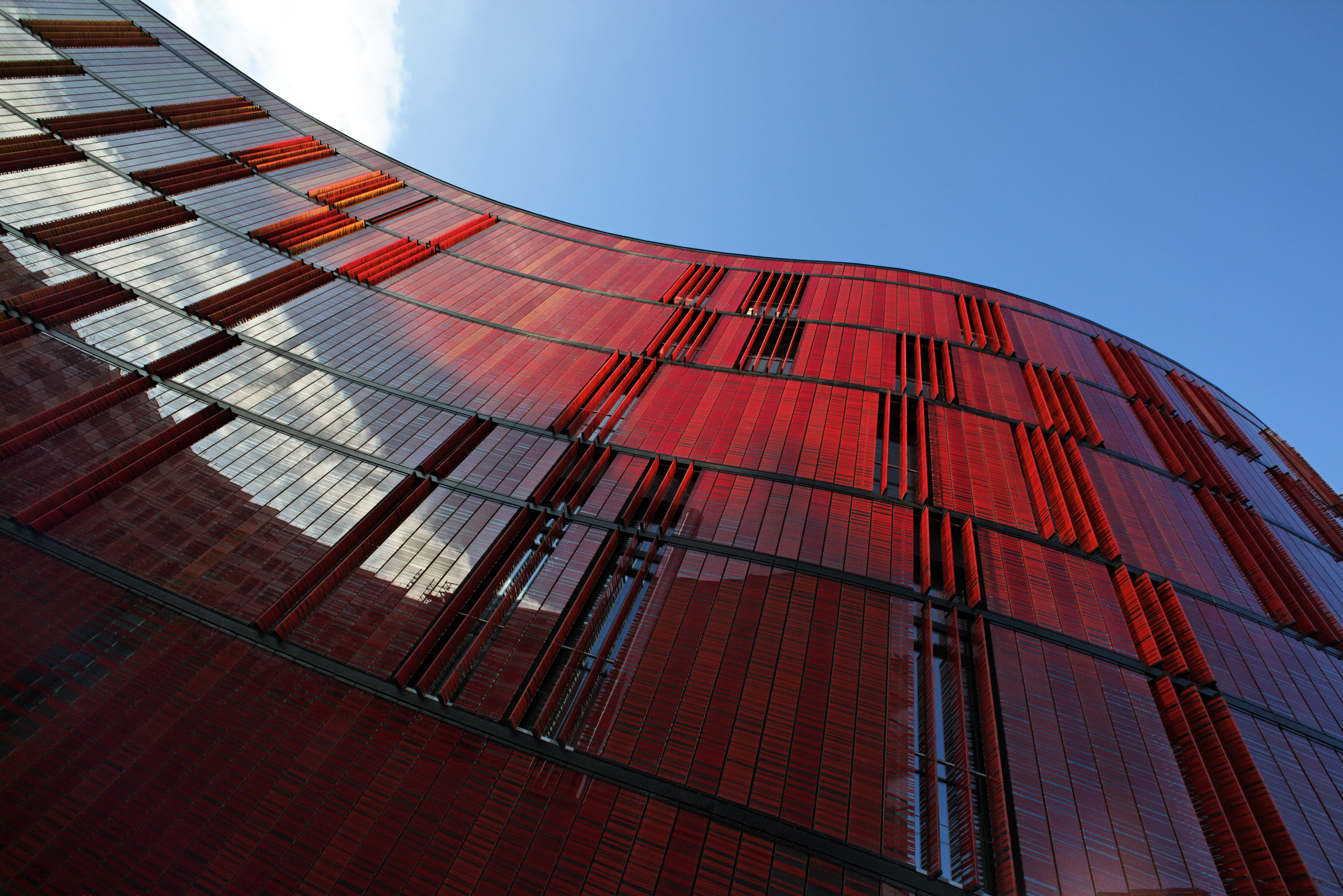
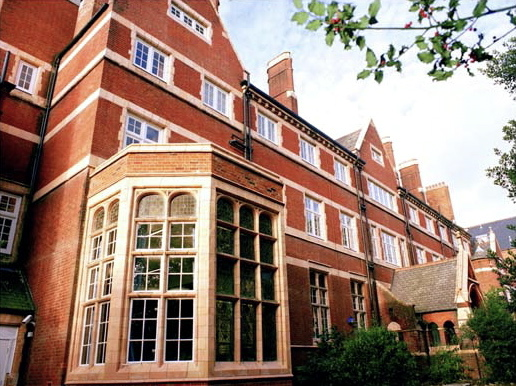
- Motto: It all starts here
- Type: Grande école de commerce et de management (Private research university Business school)
- Established: 1819; 207 years ago
- Accreditation: AACSB, EQUIS
- Academic affiliations: Conférence des grandes écoles, Sorbonne Alliance
- Budget: € 176 million (2023)
- Chairman: Philippe Houzé
- Dean: Léon Laulusa
- Faculty: 180 research professors: 100% PhD.; 38% female; 83% international
- Students: 10,000 (undergraduate & postgraduate); 5,000 (executive education)
- Location: Paris, France; Berlin, Germany; London, United Kingdom; Madrid, Spain; Turin, Italy; Warsaw, Poland
- Colors: Blue and white
- Website: escp.eu

ESCP Business School (French: École Supérieure de Commerce de Paris; English: Upper Business School of Paris) is a French business school and grande école founded in Paris and based across Europe with campuses in Paris, Berlin, London, Madrid, Turin, and Warsaw. Established in 1819, it is considered the world's oldest business school. ESCP Business School runs BSc, MBA, Executive MBA, master's degree programs in finance and management, executive education programs, and PhD programs.

It is, along with HEC and ESSEC, a member of the Parisiennes, an informal term designating the three most prestigious business schools in France.

== History ==
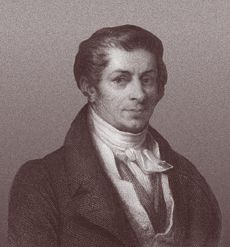
French economist and businessman Jean-Baptiste Say (1767-1832)

The school was established in Paris on 1 December 1819 by two former Napoleonic soldiers, Germain Legret and Amédée Brodart. Germain Legret had founded two business schools in Paris in 1815 and 1818, but both closed their doors rapidly. ESCP offered entrepreneurship education in the 1820s. It was modelled on the first grande école, the École Polytechnique, founded by Lazare Carnot and Gaspard Monge, but was initially more modest, in large part because it had not been supported by the state. The school, with its commercial museum, had gained international exposure since the 1820s, but it was not the only business school open to international students.. Its stature and importance ascended during the 19th century and it moved to its current Parisian location on the Avenue de la République in 1898.

In 1828, the project to put the school under the authority of the French Ministry of Commerce and Industry failed. The school remained independent by the intervention of Jérôme-Adolphe Blanqui, who took it over. Several times during the first half of the 19th century, French political developments resulted in plans to group ESCP with elite French engineering schools such as the École Polytechnique or the École Centrale Paris, but this ultimately did not happen. At the time, engineering schools in France and in Europe taught future businessmen. From 1838, the French state began to fund scholarships meant for ESCP's students.

In 1869, the Paris Chamber of Commerce took over the school, aiming to train future business leaders in modern methods in commerce and industry. In 1892, ESCP set up selective admissions processes, which continued to be retained and, today, take the form of competitive exams.

On 5 April 1973, the concept of a multi-campus business school was created, with consecutive inaugurations of campuses taking place in the United Kingdom (London in 1974, move to Oxford in 1975) and in Germany (Düsseldorf in 1975, move to Berlin in 1985). In 1974 the ESCP developed courses in entrepreneurship in response to internal and external forces. Since then, the school has deepened its European presence to become an integrated pan-European business school. In 2018, ESCP became an École consulaire, largely financed by the public Chambers of Commerce in Paris, Berlin, and Turin.

ESCP Business School campuses
- In 1985, the School's campus in Germany moved from Düsseldorf to Berlin at the invitation of the Government of Berlin.
- In 1988, a fourth campus was opened in Madrid.
- In 1999, ESCP merged with its sister school EAP.
- In 2001, the Master in Management programme taught at ESCP became validated by City St George's, University of London.
- In 2004, a fifth campus in Turin was founded, whose courses became validated by the University of Turin; Master in Management students can obtain the Italian degree of Laurea Magistrale.
- In 2005, ESCP inaugurated its London campus, having moved from Oxford.
- In 2007, the Master in Management programme was recognised by the Charles III University of Madrid; students can obtain the Spanish degree of Master Europeo en Administración y Dirección de Empresas.
- In 2015, ESCP established its sixth European campus with its partner Kozminski University in Poland.
- In 2016, the School decides to strengthen its footprint in Paris by adding a second campus located in the Montparnasse area after buying back Novancia Business School's building. The campus is dedicated to executive programs.
- In 2019, the School removed "Europe" from its name, reverting to its original name.

== Grande école degrees ==
ESCP Business School is a grande école, a French institution of higher education that is separate from, but parallel and often connected to, the main framework of the French public university system. Grandes écoles are elite academic institutions that admit students through an extremely competitive process, and a significant proportion of their graduates occupy the highest levels of French society. Similar to Ivy League universities in the United States, Oxbridge in the UK, and the C9 League in China, graduation from a grande école is viewed as the ideal prerequisite credential for any top government, administrative and corporate position in the nation.

The degrees are accredited by the Conférence des Grandes Écoles and awarded by the French Ministry of National Education. Higher education business degrees in France are organized into three levels thus facilitating international mobility: the Licence, or Bachelor's degrees, and the Master's and Doctoral degrees. The Bachelors and the Masters are organized in semesters: 6 for the Bachelors and 4 for the Masters. Those levels of study include various "parcours" or paths based on UE (Unités d'enseignement or Modules), each worth a defined number of European credits (ECTS). A student accumulates those credits, which are generally transferable between paths. A Bachelors is awarded once 180 ECTS have been obtained (bac + 3); a Masters is awarded once 120 additional credits have been obtained (bac +5). The highly coveted PGE (Programme Grande École) ends with the degree of Master in Management (MiM).

== Rankings ==
Global Rankings Business Education - Financial Times	2018	2019	2020	2021	2022	2023	2024	2025
European Business Schools	11th	14th	8th	14th	3rd	4th	5th	4th
Master in Management	5th	5th	6th	7th	5th	4th	6th	7th
Master in Finance	2nd	-	2nd	2nd	2nd	1st	1st	1st
Executive MBA	11th	14th	7th	6th	5th	3rd	2nd	3rd
Global MBA	-	-	-	-	52nd	27th	25th	
Executive Education Open	37th	51st	41st	-	19th	17th	14th	24th
Executive Education Customized	18th	18th	14th	-	12th	14th	11th	10th

== Campus ==
ESCP students can study on campuses in France (Paris), the UK (London), Spain (Madrid), Germany (Berlin), Italy (Turin), and Poland (Warsaw). They can spend either 6 months or 1 year on each campus according to their study choices. Each campus has its own specifics and develops programs with local academic institutions. For instance, in Spain, ESCP provides a Master in Business Project Management co-delivered with the Technical University of Madrid and in Italy, a double-degree program is available for engineers together with the Polytechnic University of Turin.

Since 2017, ESCP has had two campuses in Paris, one near the Place de la République (in the 11th arrondissement of Paris) and another one near the Montparnasse Tower (in the 15th arrondissement of Paris). Each campus is dedicated to a specific range of programs. The campus in the 11th arrondissement hosts all the graduate programs whereas the campus in the 15th arrondissement hosts the undergraduate education, the executive education and the school's start-up Incubator, the Blue Factory. This organization is unique to Paris; on every other campus, undergraduate, graduate and executive programmes are dispensed in the same campus.

Paris - Republique	Paris - Montparnasse

Berlin	Turin	London	Warsaw

== Partnerships ==
ESCP has over 100 partner grandes écoles and universities worldwide, several offering dual degrees.

Exchange

- University of Vienna, Austria
- Solvay Brussels School of Economics and Management, Belgium
- Fudan University, China
- Peking University, China
- Shanghai Jiao Tong University, China
- Tongji University, China
- Tsinghua University, China
- Aarhus School of Business, Denmark
- Copenhagen Business School, Denmark
- Aalto University School of Business, Finland
- Hertie School, Germany
- WHU – Otto Beisheim School of Management, Germany
- Reykjavík University, Iceland
- Trinity College Dublin, Ireland
- BI Norwegian Business School, Norway
- University of Ljubljana, Slovenia
- KAIST, South Korea
- University of Navarra, Spain
- University of Gothenburg, Sweden
- University of St. Gallen, Switzerland
- Sabancı University, Turkey
- London Business School, the UK
- Imperial College London, the UK
- Singapore Management University, Singapore
- Duke University, USA
- New York University, USA
- University of Southern California, USA

Dual degrees

- Universidad de San Andrés, Argentina
- Instituto Tecnológico de Buenos Aires, Argentina
- HEC Montréal, Canada
- Universidad de Chile, Chile
- Tongji University, China
- Tsinghua University, China
- Renmin University of China, School of Business, China
- Chinese University of Hong Kong, China
- École Centrale Paris, France
- ENSAE ParisTech, France
- Mines ParisTech, France
- École Grégoire-Ferrandi, France
- Paris 1 Panthéon-Sorbonne University, France
- Indian Institutes of Management, India
- Polytechnic University of Turin, Italy
- Università Ca' Foscari Venezia, Italy
- Waseda University, Japan
- Monterrey Institute of Technology and Higher Education, Mexico
- Rotterdam School of Management, Erasmus University, Netherlands
- Kozminski University, Poland
- Universidade Católica Portuguesa, Portugal
- Higher School of Economics, Russia
- Korea University Business School, South Korea
- Yonsei University, South Korea
- National Chengchi University, Taiwan
- Aston University, UK
- Columbia University, USA
- Cornell University, USA
- Massachusetts Institute of Technology, USA
- Sotheby's Institute of Art, USA
- University of South Carolina, USA
- University of Texas at Austin, USA
- China Europe International Business School, China
- Centre Franco-Vietnamien de Formation à la Gestion, Vietnam

== Notable alumni ==
Business

- Christophe de Margerie (ex-CEO of TotalEnergies)
- Sébastien de Montessus (born 1974). CEO of Endeavour Mining from 2016 to 2024.
- Arnaud de Puyfontaine (CEO of Vivendi)
- Victor Herrero (CEO of Guess)
- Pierre-Yves Roussel (CEO of Tory Burch LLC)
- Olaf Swantee (CEO of EE Limited)
- Federico J. González Tejera (CEO of Radisson Hotel Group)
- Tristan Nitot (President of Mozilla Europe)
- Alexandre Ricard (CEO of family business Pernod Ricard)
- François Pauly (CEO of Edmond de Rothschild Group)
- Patrick Cohen (CEO of Axa France)
- Véronique Morali (President of Fimalac)
- Edouard de Royere (CEO of Air Liquide)
- Patricia Barbizet (CEO of Christie's, Vice-chairman of the Board of Kering)
- Renaud de Lesquen (CEO of Givenchy)
- André Lacroix (CEO of Intertek)
- Patrick Thomas (CEO of Hermès)
- Arnaud Nourry (CEO of Hachette)
- Antoine Riboud (Founder of Danone)
- Thierry de La Tour d'Artaise (CEO of SEB)
- Laurent-Éric Le Lay (CEO of Eurosport)
- Philippe Heim (CEO of La Banque postale, former deputy CEO of Société Générale)
- Patrice Louvet (CEO of Ralph Lauren)
- Christian Latouche (Founder of Fiducial SA)
- Cyrille Vigneron (CEO of Cartier)
- Bertrand Dumazy (CEO of Edenred)

Politics

- Jean-Pierre Raffarin (Prime Minister of France from 2002 to 2005)
- Michel Barnier (Prime Minister of France 2025 to 2025 )
- Frédéric Salat-Baroux (Secretary-General of the Presidency of France from 2005 to 2007)
- François Zocchetto (Senator for Mayenne)
- Roxana Maracineanu (Minister of Youth Affairs and Sports)
- Claude Nougein (Senator of Corrèze)
- Stéphane Valeri (President of the Monégasque National Council from 2018 to 2022)

Research and education

- Olivier Blanchard (Chief Economist of the International Monetary Fund from 2008 to 2015, Robert M. Solow Professor Emeritus of Economics at the MIT)
- Agnès Bénassy-Quéré (Deputy governor of Banque de France & chief economist at the Direction générale du Trésor)
- Ahmad Bennani (Governor of the central bank of the Kingdom of Morocco)
- Christine Musselin (Scientific director at Sciences Po)
- Asma Mhalla (French-Tunisian political scientist and author)
- Michel Wieviorka (French sociologist at EHESS)
- Andreas Kaplan (Président at Kühne Logistics University)

Media and culture

- Leïla Slimani (Writer, Prix Goncourt laureate in 2016)
- Christophe Barbier (French journalist)
- Irma (singer)
- Hervé Hubert (French television producer)
- Aude Lancelin (French journalist)
- Jean-Marc Lofficier (Writer, publisher)
- Gilles Martin-Chauffier (Writer, Prix Interallié laureate in 1998)
- Hélène Gateau (Journalist, television presenter)

Sports

- Stéphane Diagana (Track and field gold medalist)
- Érik Boisse (Fencer gold medalist)
- Valérie Barlois (Fencer gold medalist)
- Anne-Lise Touya (Fencer gold medalist)

Associations

- Roger Cukierman (Banker, businessman and president of Conseil représentatif des institutions juives de France)
- Nathalie Boy de la Tour (President of Ligue de football professionnel)

== See also ==
- Chamber of Commerce and Industry of Paris
- HEC Paris
- ESSEC Business School
