= Christian Latouche =

French billionaire businessman

- Born: 1939 or 1940 (age 85–86); Bordeaux
- Education: ESCP Business School
- Occupation: Businessman
- Spouse: Married
- Children: 1

Christian Latouche (born 1939/1940) is a French billionaire businessman, and the founder, owner and CEO of Fiducial SA, a global accounting company.
