= Nicole de Hauteclocque =

French World War II resistance leader and politician

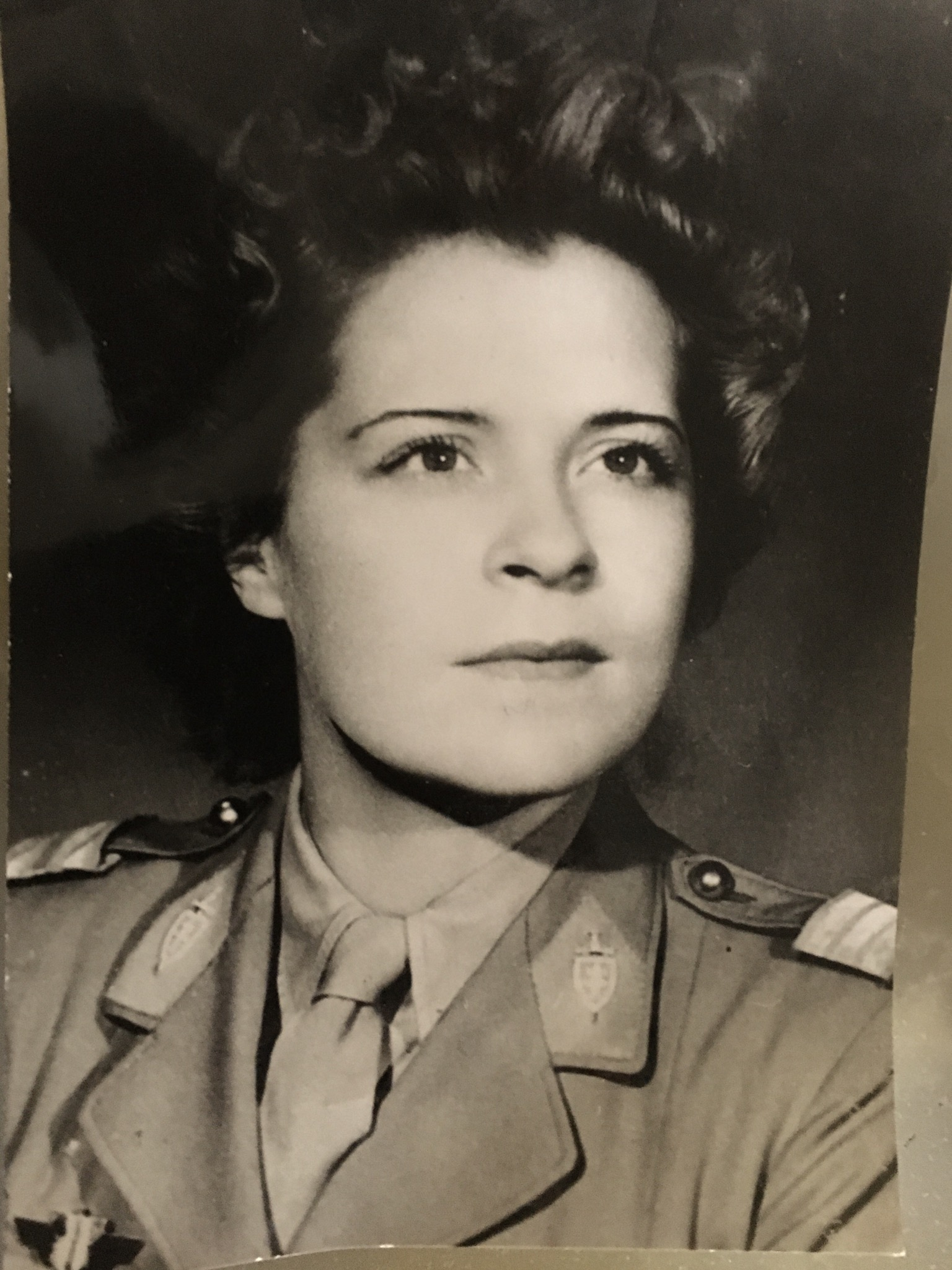

Senator for Paris
- In office 28 September 1986 – 18 January 1993

Member of the National Assembly for Paris's 18th constituency
- In office 6 December 1962 – 1 April 1986

Councilor of Paris
- In office 1947–1989

Personal details
- Born: Nicole de Saint-Denis; 10 March 1913 Commercy, Meuse, France
- Died: 18 January 1993 (aged 79) Paris, France
- Party: Rally of the French People; Union for the New Republic; Union of Democrats for the Republic; Rally for the Republic
- Spouse: Pierre de Hauteclocque (m. 1932, divorced)
- Children: 1
- Awards: Croix de Guerre 1939–1945; Resistance Medal; Commemorative medal for voluntary service in Free France; Légion d'honneur à titre militaire

Nicole de Hauteclocque (née Nicole de Saint-Denis; 10 March 1913 – 18 January 1993) was a French Second World War resistance leader and politician who served in the National Assembly as the elected representative of Paris's 18th constituency between 1962 and 1986. She also served as a councillor in the 15th arrondissement of Paris from 1947 to 1989 and as a senator for Paris in the Senate from 1986 to 1993. De Hauteclocque was awarded the Croix de Guerre 1939–1945, the Resistance Medal with Rosette, the Commemorative medal for voluntary service in Free France and the Légion d'honneur à titre militaire.

== Early life ==
On 10 March 1913, De Hauteclocque was born in Commercy, close to Nancy in Meuse. Her father, Ernest de Saint-Denis, was stationed at the barracks in Commercy and held the rank of colonel. De Hauteclocque was brought up in the Rhineland and later in the Nordic countries. She completed her education by correspondence and obtained her baccalaureate in Paris.

== Career ==
She and her parents joined the French Resistance at a meeting in Nantes in October 1940 and worked under Gilbert Renault (Colonel "Remy") until 1942, providing him with information from her relatives. De Hauteclocque moved to Paris with her daughter in late 1942. Colonel "Remy" asked radio liaison Jacques Courtaud to no longer employ De Hauteclocque in December 1942 to avoid comprising her but she was able to persuade Courtaud to make her a secretary and encryptor the following month. De Hauteclocque came into contact with an agent of a network who gave her comprehensive details on military movements in the Évreux region and on the airfields.

In June 1943, De Hauteclcocque escaped arrest when Cortuaud was detained by the Germans and ventured to Monaco with her daughter, remaining there for six weeks before returning to Paris to continue her clandestine work. She stopped working for the French Resistance in 1944. De Hauteclocque was involved in the Liberation of Paris in the Seine department in August 1944. Following the liberation of Paris, she was assigned to the Bureau Central de Renseignements et d'Action social services. De Hautecolcoque was demobilised at the rank of captain on 31 December 1946. She had been awarded the Croix de Guerre 1939–1945, the Resistance Medal with Rosette, the Commemorative medal for voluntary service in Free France and the Légion d'honneur à titre militaire.

De Hauteclocque went into politics in 1947. She became a member of the Gaullist party, the Rally of the French People, and was elected councillor of the 15th arrondissement of Paris at the 1947 French municipal elections to the Council of Paris held that October. She remained in the seat until 1989. De Hauteclocque was the Council of Paris' vice-president between 1954 and 1955 and for a second time from 1962 to 1963. She was the first woman to chair the Council of Paris between 1972 and 1973. While on the council, De Hauteclocque was a specialist in security issues such as being the rapporteur for the police budget. This saw her work closely with the Paris police authorities during the 1950s and the 1960s. De Hauteclocque was appointed Deputy Mayor of Paris in charge of police and security by the city's mayor Jacques Chirac in 1977 immediately following his election to the position.

At the 1958 French legislative election, De Hauteclocque unsuccessfully ran for election to represent Paris's 18th constituency on behalf of the Union for the New Republic party in the National Assembly. She was able to get elected at the following 1962 French legislative election and took up her seat on 25 November 1962 which she held until 1 April 1986 after agreeing with Chirac to give up her mandate and be placed last on the party's electoral list. De Hauteclocque changed parties to the Union of Democrats for the Republic and then the Rally for the Republic. She served on the Foreign Affairs Committee as well as the National Defence and Armed Forces Committee and on the Rally for the Republic's central committee.

That September, De Hauteclocque stood for election to the Senate. She was elected to serve the Paris district and took up her seat on 28 September 1986. De Hauteclocque was a member of the Foreign Affairs Committee during her time in the Senate. Her seat was vacated following her death and a special election was held to elect her successor.

== Personal life ==
In 1932, she married second lieutenant Pierre de Hauteclocque. They had a daughter. The marriage was later dissolved. On 18 January 1993, De Hauteclcoque died in Paris after a cardiac arrest.

== Legacy ==
The Square Nicole-de-Hauteclocque public space in the 15th arrondissement of Paris is named for her.
