= Nathalie Boy de la Tour =

French football executive (born 1968)

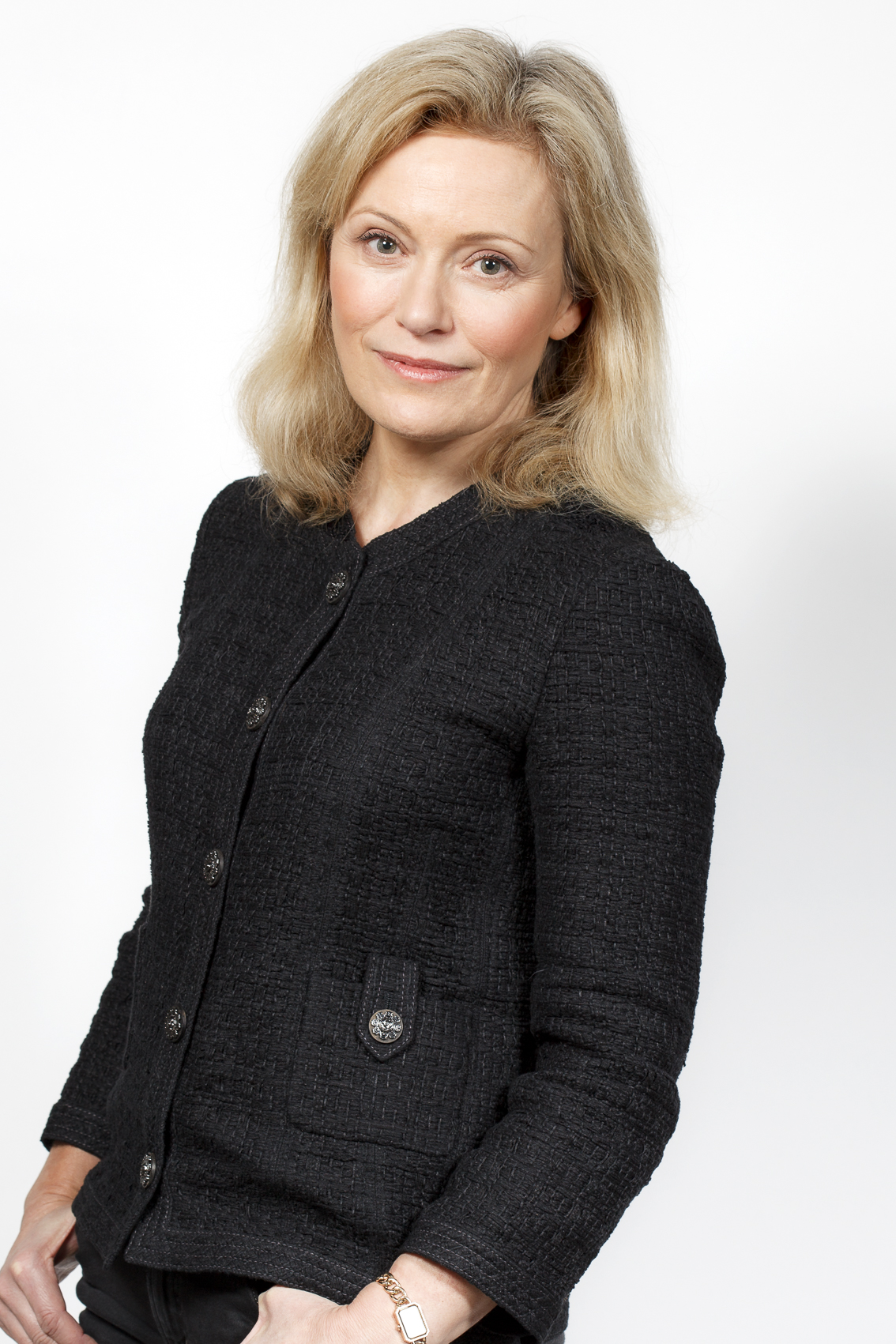
- Boy de la Tour in 2018

President of the Ligue de Football Professionnel
- In office 11 November 2016 – 10 September 2020
- Preceded by: Jean-Pierre Denis
- Succeeded by: Vincent Labrune

Personal details
- Born: Nathalie Katia Szenberg; 19 August 1968 (age 58) Saint-Cyr-l'École, France
- Education: École supérieure libre des sciences commerciales appliquées ESCP Europe
- Profession: Football executive

Nathalie Katia Boy de la Tour (French: [natali bwa d(ə) la tur]; née Szenberg; born 19 August 1968) is a French football executive. She served as president of the Ligue de Football Professionnel from 11 November 2016 to 10 September 2020.

== Biography ==
Boy de la Tour graduated with a master's degree from ESCP Europe in 1991. She later worked for consultancy firm Bossard Gemini and advertising agency BBDO. In July 2013, she became the first female member of the administrative council of the Ligue de Football Professionnel (LFP). In November 2016, she was elected president by the LFP's general assembly, defeating the council's nominee Raymond Domenech.

== Honours ==
Orders

- Knight of the National Order of Merit: 2011
