= Paris's 18th constituency =

Constituency of the National Assembly of France

18th constituency of Paris
- inline Constituency of the National Assembly of France

- Paris, showing its post 2012 legislative constituencies
- Deputy: Aymeric Caron; LFI
- Department: Paris
- Registered voters: 67,245

The 18th constituency of Paris (French: Dix-huitième circonscription de Paris) is a French legislative constituency in the Paris département (75). Like the other 576 French constituencies, it elects one MP using the two-round system. It is based in the north of the department. In the 2010 redistricting of French legislative constituencies, the 18th stayed covering the same area of Paris, with a small boundary change.

18th constituency of Paris
- inline Constituency of the National Assembly of France

- Paris, showing its legislative constituencies between 1988 and 2012
- Member: constituency abolished, 2012
- Department: Paris

Map of Paris constituencies in 1981.

Before the 1986 redistricting of French legislative constituencies, the 18th constituency referred to a constituency in the South-West of the city.

== Historic representation ==
Election	Member	Party	Source
1958	Jean-Robert Debray	CNIP	
1962	Nicole de Hauteclocque	UNR	
1967	Nicole de Hauteclocque	UDR	
1968	Nicole de Hauteclocque	UDR	
1973	Nicole de Hauteclocque	UDR	
1978	Nicole de Hauteclocque	RPR	
1981	Nicole de Hauteclocque	RPR	
1986	Proportional representation - no election by constituency		
1988	Alain Juppé	RPR	
1993	Alain Juppé	RPR	
1997	Christophe Caresche	PS	
2002	Christophe Caresche	PS	
2007	Christophe Caresche	PS	
2012	Christophe Caresche	PS	
2017	Pierre-Yves Bournazel	LR	
2017	Pierre-Yves Bournazel	Agir	
2022	Aymeric Caron	LFI	
2024	Aymeric Caron	LFI	

== Election results ==
=== 2024 ===
Legislative Election 2024: Paris's 18th constituency
Party	Candidate	Votes	%	±%
LFI (NFP)	Aymeric Caron	25,303	50.37	+5.32
HOR (Ensemble)	Pierre-Yves Bournazel	16,346	32.54	N/A
DIV	Valérie Tirefort	3,444	6.86	N/A
LR	Rudolph Granier	2,104	4.19	+0.62
DVG	Catherine Coutard	778	1.54	N/A
UDI (Ensemble)	Philippine Long	775	1.54	N/A
DVG	Pierre Bravoz	717	1.43	N/A
REC	Marguerite Pierre	503	1.00	−2.19
LO	Annie Boubault	192	0.38	N/A
Volt	Audrey Le Bœuf	64	0.13	N/A
DIV	David Thiele	8	0.02	N/A
DIV	Stéphane Manigold	0	0.00	N/A
DIV	Béatrice Faillès	0	0.00	N/A
DVC	Tasmin Berrouba	0	0.00	N/A
Turnout		50,826	75.47	+19.17
LFI hold				

=== 2022 ===
Legislative Election 2022: Paris's 18th constituency
Party	Candidate	Votes	%	±%
LFI (NUPÉS)	Aymeric Caron	17,632	45.05	-5.35
HOR (Ensemble)	Pierre-Yves Bournazel	13,922	35.57	N/A
DVG	Nicolas Ravailhe	1,553	3.97	N/A
LR (UDC)	Rudolph Granier	1,398	3.57	−28.19
RN	Julia Carrasco	1,318	3.37	+0.18
REC	Axelle Le Gal De Kerangal	1,248	3.19	N/A
DVD	Laurent Boula	870	2.22	N/A
Others	N/A	1,196		
Turnout		39,791	56.30	+0.73
2nd round result
LFI (NUPÉS)	Aymeric Caron	19,914	51.65	+5.28
HOR (Ensemble)	Pierre-Yves Bournazel	18,645	48.35	N/A
Turnout		38,559	56.44	+13.75
LFI gain from LR				

=== 2017 ===
Legislative Election 2017: Paris's 18th constituency
Party	Candidate	Votes	%	±%
LR	Pierre-Yves Bournazel	11,634	31.76	+8.88
PS	Myriam El Khomri	7,412	20.23	−24.98
LFI	Paul Vannier	6,080	16.60	N/A
EELV	Caroline De Haas	4,971	13.57	+4.02
FN	Annie Lavenier	1,170	3.19	−2.14
DVG	Violette Baranda	957	2.61	N/A
Others	N/A	4,407		
Turnout		37,371	55.57	−3.07
2nd round result
LR	Pierre-Yves Bournazel	12,954	53.61	+22.81
PS	Myriam El Khomri	11,209	46.39	−22.81
Turnout		28,706	42.69	−11.76
LR gain from PS		Swing		

=== 2012 ===
Legislative Election 2012: Paris's 18th constituency
Party	Candidate	Votes	%	±%
PS	Christophe Caresche	17,217	45.21	+7.53
UMP	Pierre-Yves Bournazel	8,715	22.88	−6.70
FG	Marie-Pierre Toubhans	3,777	9.92	+6.38
EELV	Bastien François	3,636	9.55	+2.24
FN	Annabelle Letaconnoux	2,030	5.33	+2.10
MoDem	Grégoire Artinian	1,113	2.92	−8.07
Others	N/A	1,595		
Turnout		38,083	58.64	−2.52
2nd round result
PS	Christophe Caresche	24,468	69.20	+5.91
UMP	Pierre-Yves Bournazel	10,888	30.80	−5.91
Turnout		35,356	54.45	−3.17
PS hold				

=== 2007 ===
Elections between 1988 and 2007 were based on the 1988 boundaries. The 18th constituency had minor boundary changes in the 2010 redistricting of French legislative constituencies.

Map of Paris Constituencies, 1988-2007 elections

Legislative Election 2007: Paris's 18th constituency
Party	Candidate	Votes	%	±%
PS	Christophe Caresche	12,746	37.68	
UMP	Jeannette Bougrab	10,004	29.58	
MoDem	Maxence Ansel	3,718	10.99	
LV	Sylvain Garel	2,471	7.31	
PCF	Gérald Briant	1,197	3.54	
Far left	Danielle Louseau	1,144	3.38	
FN	Cyril Bozonnet	1,094	3.23	
Others	N/A	1,449		
Turnout		34,150	61.16	
2nd round result
PS	Christophe Caresche	19,895	63.29	
UMP	Jeannette Bougrab	11,540	36.71	
Turnout		32,170	57.62	
PS hold				

=== 2002 ===
Legislative Election 2002: Paris's 18th constituency
Party	Candidate	Votes	%	±%
PS	Christophe Caresche	12,779	38.18	
UMP	Xavier Chinaud	10,386	31.03	
FN	Pierre Combe	2,656	7.93	
LV	Jean-Jacques Anding	2,483	7.42	
PCF	Fode Sylla	1,129	3.37	
DVD	Olivier Regis	952	2.84	
LCR	Anne Leclerc	815	2.43	
Pôle républicain	Olivier Jouis	615	1.84	
Cap21	Stephane Maillard	380	1.14	
Others	N/A	1,278		
Turnout		33,790	69.42	
2nd round result
PS	Christophe Caresche	17,649	57.37	
UMP	Xavier Chinaud	13,113	42.63	
Turnout		31,610	64.94	
PS hold				

=== 1997 ===
Legislative Election 1997: Paris's 18th constituency
Party	Candidate	Votes	%	±%
RPR	Patrick Stefanini	8,735	28.61	
PS	Christophe Caresche	8,352	27.35	
FN	Xavier Schleiter	3,871	12.68	
PCF	Isabelle Mayer	2,113	6.92	
LV	Anne Le Strat	2,058	6.74	
DVD	Bruneau Chauvierre	1,124	3.68	
LO	Jean-Marie Benito	836	2.74	
DVD	Arnaud Folch	671	2.20	
Others	N/A	2,775		
Turnout		31,440	63.79	
2nd round result
PS	Christophe Caresche	16,782	51.58	
RPR	Patrick Stefanini	15,751	48.42	
Turnout		33,926	68.83	
PS gain from RPR				
