= Mozilla Europe =

Non-profit organisation

- Formation: 17 February 2004
- Dissolved: 17 February 2012 (8 years)
- Type: Non-profit organisation
- Legal status: Association loi 1901
- Headquarters: 28 rue Viala, 75015 Paris, France
- Region served: Europe
- President: Tristan Nitot
- Main organ: Board of Directors
- Affiliations: Mozilla Foundation

Mozilla Europe was a non-profit organisation that promoted and deployed Mozilla products, like Firefox and Thunderbird, in Europe. It was founded on 17 February 2004 by contributors to Mozilla and other free software projects, and was an independent affiliate of the Mozilla Foundation with headquarters in Paris, France. It was disbanded on 17 February 2012 after Mozilla created an official structure in Paris in late 2011.

The organisation was managed by a board of directors, which included (as of March 2011) Tristan Nitot (President), Jean-Christophe Lapprand (Treasurer), Pascal Chevrel (Secretary General), Zbigniew Braniecki, Axel Hecht and Peter Van der Beken.

== Languages ==
As of March 2011, Mozilla Europe's web site was available in 27 languages: Albanian, Basque, Bulgarian, Catalan, Croatian, Czech, Danish, Dutch, English, Finnish, French, German, Greek, Hungarian, Italian, Lithuanian, Norwegian, Polish, Portuguese, Romanian, Russian, Serbian, Slovak, Spanish, Swedish, Turkish, and Ukrainian. Selected pages are also available in Irish Gaelic, Scottish Gaelic and Welsh.
