= Hélène Gateau =

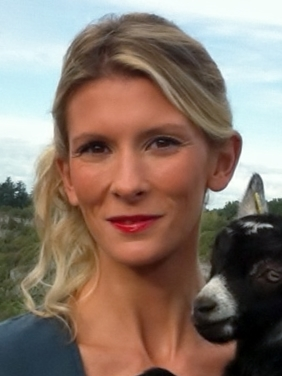
- Hélène Gateau in Rocamadour (2013)
- Born: Hélène Boucher; 7 December 1980 (age 45); Saint-Quentin, Aisne, France
- Occupations: Veterinarian, television presenter, columnist
- Notable credit: Hélène et les animaux
- Television: France 3 (2011–15); France 5 (2014–present)

Hélène Gateau (born 7 December 1980) is a French veterinarian and television presenter. Since 2011, she presents the section dedicated to animals in the daily television program Midi en France presented by Laurent Boyer on France 3. Since September 2014, she presents the documentary series Hélène et les animaux on France 5.

== Early life and education ==
Hélène Gateau was born in Saint-Quentin in the department of Aisne. After having obtained her scientific high school final exam with very good honor, she studied at the École nationale vétérinaire de Nantes and at the École nationale vétérinaire d'Alfort, where she presents at age 22 a veterinarian doctoral thesis about dog behavior. She then became a veterinarian in a liberal veterinary practice before joining industrial companies like Nestlé and Pfizer, after a master's degree at the ESCP Europe.

== Television career ==
=== France 3 ===
In December 2010, she received an invitation for a casting. She was then selected to become a columnist for the animal section in the program Midi en France with Laurent Boyer, who was the host from January 2011 to June 2015, and that began on France 3 on January 31, 2011. In the program, she presented reports about different animal species and breeds of the regions where the program took place. Every week, Hélène Gateau attempted to adopt animals who were abandoned and were saved by refuges, presenting them on the screen. She left the program in June 2015.

=== France 5 ===
In September 2014, she started presenting the documentary series Hélène et les animaux that she will present full-time in September 2015, and in which she goes exploring in France and foreign countries, the relationship between humans and animals.
