= Tristan Nitot =

French founder of Mozilla Europe (born 1966)

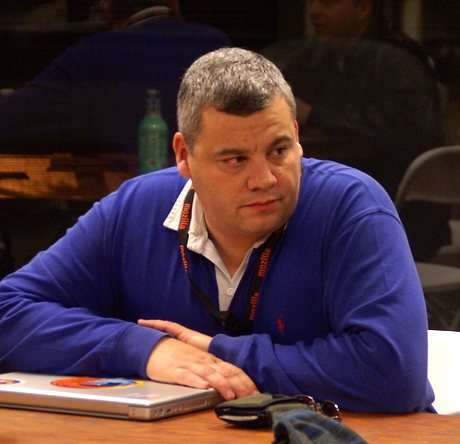
- Tristan Nitot
- Born: 19 October 1966 (age 59); Suresnes, France
- Known for: being President of Mozilla Europe

Tristan Nitot (born 19 October 1966) is the founder and former president of Mozilla Europe.

== Education ==
Tristan Nitot is a graduate of the École Supérieure d’Informatique de Paris (or SUPINFO, a school for advanced computer studies) in Paris, also known as ESI. He also has a master's degree from ESCP (management studies) in Paris, specialising in social management of organisations.

== Career ==
After having been the technical manager of a start-up specializing in computer security and having worked for Partner Soft S.A in Paris, he joined the Netscape Communications Corporation where he held various positions from 1997 to 2003, first running product marketing in Southern Europe and then acting as a Technology Evangelist, managing developer relations in Europe.

Tristan Nitot also helped to launch the OpenWeb.eu.org project in 2002, aiming at promoting Web standards and accessibility.

Since January 2004 he has been the founder and chairman of Mozilla Europe, the international affiliate of the Mozilla Foundation, a post he first occupied on a pro bono basis. In May 2005, he became an employee of Mozilla Europe, the European home of the Firefox Web browser.

He has been contributing to the project since 2001.

Nitot has been publishing material on the Web since 1996, and started blogging in 2002 on standblog.org. His blog, mostly dedicated to the promotion of open source software, reaches an average of 12,000 readers daily.

On 3 February 2015, Nitot announced that he was leaving the Mozilla Foundation. He wants to write a book denouncing the mass surveillance of citizens. On 11 March 2015, the French startup Cozy Cloud announced his hiring as chief product officer for their open source personal cloud product.

On 4 June 2018, Qwant announced that Tristan Nitot has joined their team as Vice-president Advocacy focused on Open Source and privacy.

In September 2019, Nitot became the CEO of Qwant. He left Qwant in March 2020.

== Personal life ==
Nitot is married, and has two children.
