= Ecological Revolution for the Living =

Ecological Revolution for the Living Révolution écologique pour le vivant
- Abbreviation: REV
- Founder and President: Aymeric Caron
- Vice-President: Lamya Essemlali
- Founded: 8 February 2018; 8 years ago
- Membership (2018): 4,000 (claimed)
- Ideology: Veganism; Global federalism Animal rights Deep ecology Democratic socialism Opposition to hunting
- Political position: Left-wing
- National affiliation: New Popular Front (2024–present); New Ecological and Social People's Union (2022–2024)
- Colours: Teal; Old gold
- National Assembly: 1 / 577
- Senate: 0 / 348
- European Parliament: 0 / 79
- Presidency of Regional Councils: 0 / 17
- Presidency of Departmental Councils: 0 / 101

Website
- revolutionecologiquepourlevivant.fr

The Ecological Revolution for the Living (REV; French: Révolution écologique pour le vivant) is a minor political party in France, founded in 2018 by Aymeric Caron, who was elected in 2022 as its sole Member of Parliament.

== History ==
The party was formed on 8 February 2018 following dissatisfaction with Europe Ecology – The Greens. Aymeric Caron expressed the view that The Greens lost its legitimacy to take care of the ecological crisis by embracing capitalistic values of the market instead of focusing on what is actually important.

Formerly named Ecological Union for the Living, the party adopted its actual name in 2020.

In the 2022 French legislative election, Aymeric Caron of the Ecological Revolution for the Living was elected to the National Assembly in the 18th constituency of Paris with the support of the New Ecological and Social People's Union alliance. Upon taking office, Caron, who became the party's sole Member of Parliament, chose to sit with the La France Insoumise group rather than as an independent.

== Ideology ==
A self-described anti-speciesist and deep ecologist political party, REV emphasizes the rejection of the commodity status of animals.

REV is an explicitly vegan political party claiming to refuse "the exploitation and the slaughter of non-human animals to satisfy morbid and unnecessary food cravings."

REV sets out four fundamental rights for non-human animals:

- The right not to be killed.
- The right not to be tortured.
- The right not to be locked up.
- The right not to be sold.

To achieve these rights, REV proposes the gradual closure of all meat farms, a ban on hunting and fishing, the closure of non-rehabilitative zoos and aquariums, prohibition of fur production and sale, and closure of pet stores in favor of non-kill animal shelters.

On economic issues, REV takes a democratic socialist and anti-consumerist stance. It advocates for a 28-hour working week, a strengthening of the national healthcare system, public banking, a tax on financial transactions, and a maximum income of €480,000 a year.

As an environmentalist political party, REV advocates for the transition to 100% renewable energy, followed by the gradual closure of all nuclear power plants. Additionally it advocates for free public transportation to incentivize low emission transit, a national ban on single-use plastics and the establishment of water as a common good and universal fundamental right, guaranteeing its free access for all.

On social issues, REV takes a pro-immigrant, secular and socially progressive stance. It calls for an end to police brutality, the equal status of men and women, LGBT acceptance, legalization of euthanasia, the creation of a legal route to the Schengen area, zero migrant deaths at European borders, and universal asylum for climate refugees.

REV also calls for a reformed French democracy, calling for the abolition of the Senate and the office of the President, the replacement of ballotage with a proportional representation system, and limitations on the power of lobbies in the political system.

On foreign policy, REV calls for the creation of a global federal government either through the manifestation of a new internationalist organization, or through the reformation of the United Nations. Additionally, REV calls for the gradual abandonment of borders, international nuclear disarmament, the creation of an international regulatory body to ensure trade justice, and the cancelation of "illegitimate debts" owed to developed nations from the developing world. Since the beginning of the Gaza genocide, REV has called for a trade embargo with Israel, an end to the genocide, and favored the creation of one binational secular state in Israel/Palestine.

== Presidential Elections of 2022 ==
In January 2022, the REV joined the Parliament of the People's Union to support Jean-Luc Mélenchon's candidature. It participated in writing the program, mainly concerning animals' rights. Despite the program being less ambitious than what the REV advocates for outside of this alliance, it is still considered the most viable plan for ecology as a whole.

== Legislatives Elections of 2022 ==
During the Presidential Election, the REV negotiated an agreement with LFI in regard to the candidates and to avoid competing against each other. This agreement was to be upheld in the NUPES (New Social and Ecological People's Union) which is an electoral contract between the main four leftist parties. The REV was to present 10 candidates in counties historically right-leaning. This situation ended with only one candidate elected : Aymeric Caron, the party's founder.

== European Elections of 2024 ==
In February 2024, the REV announced its alliance with La France Insoumise in order not to dilute votes any more than they actually were. Three members of the REV were candidates: Carine Sandon, Laura Vallée-Hans and Gregory Perche, respectively 11th, 55th and 66th on the list.

The People's Union came out of the election with 9 elected candidates, and thus no member of the REV was elected to the European Parliament.

=== European Parliament ===
Election	Leader	Votes	%	Seats	+/−	EP Group
2024 (Note: Run in a joint list with LFI, POI, GES, Péyi-A and PLR, that won 9 seats in total.)	Manon Aubry	2,432,976	9.87 (#4)	0 / 81	New	−

== Legislatives Elections of 2024 ==
After Emmanuel Macron's decision to have early legislatives elections, the REV naturally sided with the New Popular Front, a new alliance negotiated on what remained of the NUPES. During the discussion, it was decided the REV would present five candidates. Out of the five, Aymeric Caron was re-elected triumphantly without a second turn. Among the four others, only Victor Prandt went to a second turn but ended losing to a far-right candidate.

== See also ==
- List of political parties in France
- List of animal advocacy parties
- Animalist Party
