= Christophe Caresche =

French politician

Member of the National Assembly for Paris's 18th constituency
- In office 1997–2017
- Preceded by: Alain Juppé
- Succeeded by: Pierre-Yves Bournazel

Personal details
- Born: 2 September 1960 (age 66) Arcachon, France
- Party: Socialist Party
- Education: Sciences Po Grenoble

Christophe Caresche (born 2 September 1960 in Arcachon) was a member of the National Assembly of France from 1997 to 2017. He represented the Paris's 18th constituency as a member of the Socialiste, radical, citoyen et divers gauche.
