= Politics of Île-de-France =

The politics of Île-de-France, France takes place in a framework of a presidential representative democracy, whereby the President of Regional Council is the head of government, and of a pluriform multi-party system. Legislative power is vested in the regional council.

== Executive ==
The executive of the region is led by the President of the regional council.

=== List of presidents ===
Period		Identity	Political Party
1976	1988	Michel Giraud (1929-2011)	RPR
1988	1992	Pierre-Charles Krieg (1922-1998)	RPR
1992	1998	Michel Giraud (1929-2011)	RPR
1998	2015	Jean-Paul Huchon (1946-)	PS
2015	July 3, 2021	Valérie Pécresse (1967-)	LR, then SL
2021	Ongoing (as of July 20, 2021)	Valérie Pécresse (1967-)	SL

== Legislative branch ==
The Regional Council of Île-de-France (Conseil régional d'Île-de-France) is composed of 209 councillors, elected by proportional representation in a two-round system. The winning list in the second round is automatically entitled to a quarter of the seats. The remainder of the seats are allocated through proportional representation with a 5% threshold.

The Council is elected for a six-year term.

=== Current composition ===
List of political groups in the council
Party	Acronym	Elected	Group
Majority (125 seats)
The Republicans	LR	59	Île-de-France gathered (102 seats)
Miscellaneous right	DVD	14	Île-de-France gathered (102 seats)
Soyons Libres	SL	11	Île-de-France gathered (102 seats)
Democratic Movement	MoDem	8	Île-de-France gathered (102 seats)
La France Audacieuse	LFA	2	Île-de-France gathered (102 seats)
Radical Movement	MR	2	Île-de-France gathered (102 seats)
Agir	Agir	2	Île-de-France gathered (102 seats)
The Centrists	LC	1	Île-de-France gathered (102 seats)
Union of Democrats and Ecologists	UDE	1	Île-de-France gathered (102 seats)
Independent Ecological Movement	MEI	1	Île-de-France gathered (102 seats)
La France Vraiment	LFV	1	Île-de-France gathered (102 seats)
Union of Democrats and Independents	UDI	23	UDI (23 seats)
Opposition (84 seats)
Europe Ecology - The Greens	EELV	11	Ecologist pole (18 seats)
Génération.s	G s	5	Ecologist pole (18 seats)
Cap Écologie	CE	1	Ecologist pole (18 seats)
Ecology Generation	GÉ	1	Ecologist pole (18 seats)
Socialist Party	PS	15	Île-de-France in common (18 seats)
Radical Party of the Left	PRG	1	Île-de-France in common (18 seats)
Miscellaneous left	DVG	1	Île-de-France in common (18 seats)
Les Écolos Solidaires	LÉS	1	Île-de-France in common (18 seats)
La France Insoumise	LFI	9	LFI and related (17 seats)
French Communist Party	PCF	7	LFI and related (17 seats)
Animalist Party	PA	1	LFI and related (17 seats)
National Rally	RN	15	RN Ile-de-France (16 seats)
L'Avenir Français	LAF	1	RN Ile-de-France (16 seats)
La République En Marche!	LREM	9	Presidential majority (15 seats)
Democratic movement	MoDem	4	Presidential majority (15 seats)
Territories of Progress	TdP	1	Presidential majority (15 seats)
Agir	Agir	1	Presidential majority (15 seats)
