= Patrick Beaudouin =

French politician

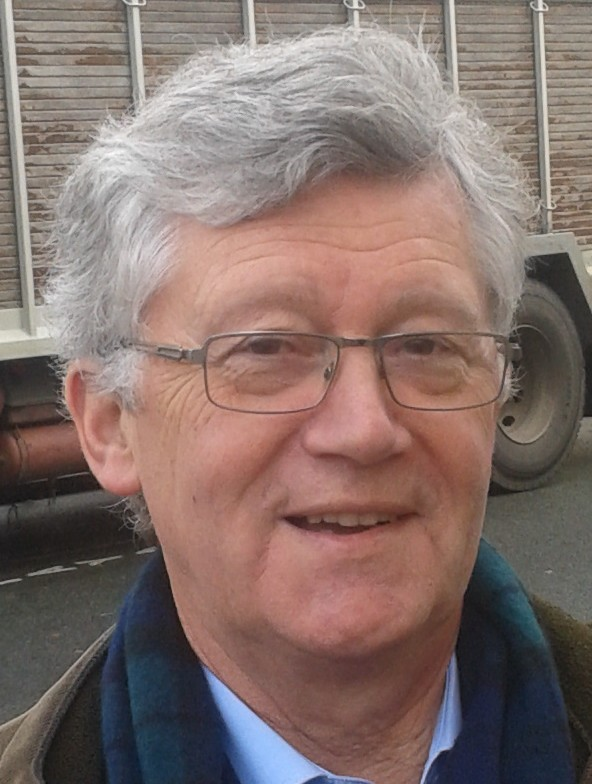

Mayor of Saint-Mandé
- Incumbent
- Assumed office 25 June 1995
- Preceded by: Robert-André Vivien

Member of the National Assembly for Val-de-Marne's 6th constituency
- In office 2002–2012
- Preceded by: Michel Giraud
- Succeeded by: Laurence Abeille

Personal details
- Born: 7 April 1953 (age 73) Brionne, France
- Party: The Republicans

Patrick Beaudouin (born 7 April 1953) is a member of the National Assembly of France. He represents the Val-de-Marne department, and is a member of the Union for a Popular Movement.

== Biography ==
Patrick Beaudouin is a communications and public relations consultant. He has been mayor of Saint-Mandé since 1995, first on the RPR list and then the Union for a Popular Movement list, after serving as a municipal councilor and then deputy mayor to Robert-André Vivien for twelve years.

After serving as Michel Giraud deputy following the 1995 by-election and then during the period 1997-2002, and following the Île-de-France public procurement scandals involving the latter, Patrick Beaudouin ran for office and was elected to the National Assembly on June 16, 2002, for the 12th legislature (2002-2007), in the 6th district of Val-de-Marne. He was re-elected on June 17, 2007, during the 2007 legislative elections. He is a member of the UMP group and belongs to The Popular Right (Parliamentary Group of the Popular Right).

He was defeated in the second round of the 2012 legislative election by Laurence Abeille, candidate for The Ecologists – The Greens-PS.

In 2014, he was re-elected mayor of Saint-Mandé after a difficult campaign in which he won in a four-way race. During the campaign, he pledged that if elected deputy, this would be his last term in office, due to the application of the law on multiple mandates.

During the 2017 legislative elections, the local and national political context prevented him from running. He ceded his place to Gildas Lecoq (UDI), who was himself defeated by Guillaume Gouffier-Cha (Larem).
