= Val-de-Marne's 6th constituency =

Constituency of the National Assembly of France

6th constituency of Val-de-Marne
- inline Constituency of the National Assembly of France

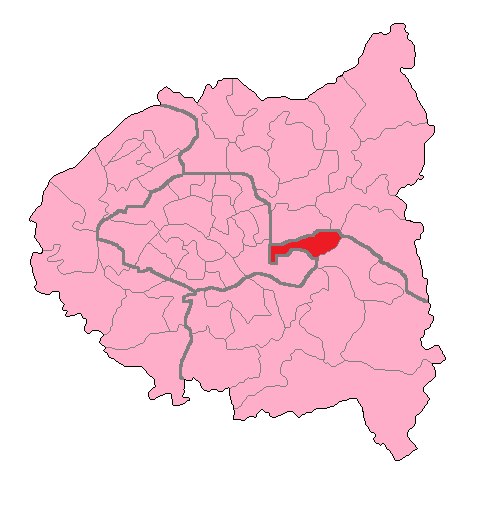
- Val-de-Marne's 6th Constituency shown within Île-de-France
- Deputy: Guillaume Gouffier-Cha; RE
- Department: Val-de-Marne
- Cantons: Fontenay-sous-Bois-Est - Fontenay-sous-Bois-Ouest - Saint-Mandé - Vincennes-Est - Vincennes-Ouest
- Registered voters: 77,995

The 6th constituency of Val-de-Marne is a French legislative constituency in the Val-de-Marne département.

== Description ==
The 6th constituency of Val-de-Marne is a wedge of territory between the Bois de Vincennes to the south and Seine-Saint-Denis to the north forming part of the eastern suburbs of Paris.

The seat returned conservatives at every election from 1988 onwards, however at the 2012 the seat was captured by Laurence Abeille of the Greens.

== Historic Representation ==
| Election | Member | Party |
|---|---|---|
| 1967 | Roland Nungesser | UDR |
| 1968 | Roland Nungesser | UDR |
| 1973 | Roland Nungesser | UDR |
| 1978 | Roland Nungesser | RPR |
| 1981 | Roland Nungesser | RPR |
| 1986 | Proportional representation – no election by constituency | |
| 1988 | Robert-André Vivien | RPR |
| 1993 | Michel Giraud | RPR |
| 1997 | Michel Giraud | RPR |
| 2002 | Patrick Beaudouin | UMP |
| 2007 | Patrick Beaudouin | UMP |
| 2012 | Laurence Abeille | EELV |
| 2017 | Guillaume Gouffier-Cha | LREM |
| 2022 | Guillaume Gouffier-Cha | RE |

== Election results ==
=== 2024 ===
| Candidate | Party | Alliance | First round | | | Second round | | |
| Candidate | Party | Alliance | Votes | % | +/– | Votes | % | +/– |
|---|---|---|---|---|---|---|---|---|
| May Bouhada | LÉ | NFP | 24,417 | 40.63 | +4.37 | 26,049 | 47.46 | |
| Guillaume Gouffier Valente | RE | ENS | 22,464 | 37.38 | +0.98 | 28,834 | 52.54 | |
| Martina Gabelica | RN | | 8,347 | 13.89 | +8.40 | | | |
| Victor Gaonach | DIV | | 2,325 | 3.87 | N/A | | | |
| Rémy Longetti | REC | | 1,099 | 1.83 | -4.43 | | | |
| Tony Renault | ÉAC | | 979 | 1.63 | N/A | | | |
| Véronique Hunaut | LO | | 290 | 0.48 | -0.13 | | | |
| Murielle Morand | EXG | | 176 | 0.29 | N/A | | | |
| Valid votes | | | 60,097 | 98.53 | -0.06 | 54,883 | 95.54 | |
| Blank votes | | | 608 | 1.00 | -0.03 | 1,941 | 3.38 | |
| Null votes | | | 287 | 0.47 | +0.09 | 622 | 1.08 | |
| Turnout | | | 60,992 | 73.99 | +19.27 | 57,446 | 69.68 | |
| Abstentions | | | 21,439 | 26.01 | -19.27 | 24,996 | 30.32 | |
| Registered voters | | | 82,431 | | | 82,442 | | |
Source: Ministry of the Interior, Le Monde
| Result | | | | | | RE HOLD | | |

=== 2022 ===
Legislative Election 2022: Val-de-Marne's 6th constituency
| Party | Candidate | Votes | % | ±% |
|---|---|---|---|---|
| LREM (Ensemble) | Guillaume Gouffier-Cha | 16,126 | 36.40 | -3.85 |
| EELV (NUPÉS) | May Bouhada | 16,061 | 36.26 | +8.88 |
| UDI (UDC) | Huguette Frieh | 2,791 | 6.30 | −12.16 |
| REC | Charles Taieb | 2,771 | 6.26 | N/A |
| RN | Catherine Chaput | 2,432 | 5.49 | +0.67 |
| DVE | Tony Renault | 961 | 2.17 | N/A |
| Others | N/A | 3,157 | | |
| Turnout | | 44,933 | 54.72 | −0.14 |
2nd round result
| LREM (Ensemble) | Guillaume Gouffier-Cha | 23,416 | 54.36 | -4.86 |
| EELV (NUPÉS) | May Bouhada | 19,661 | 45.64 | N/A |
| Turnout | | 43,077 | 54.73 | +10.60 |
| LREM hold | | | | |

=== 2017 ===
Legislative Election 2017: Val-de-Marne's 6th constituency
| Party | Candidate | Votes | % | ±% |
|---|---|---|---|---|
| LREM | Guillaume Gouffier-Cha | 17,736 | 40.25 | N/A |
| UDI | Gildas Lecoq | 8,133 | 18.46 | N/A |
| EELV | Laurence Abeille | 7,096 | 16.10 | −10.62 |
| LFI | Stéphanie Michel | 4,968 | 11.28 | N/A |
| FN | Gorete De Freitas | 2,124 | 4.82 | −2.07 |
| DIV | Charles Taieb | 2,022 | 4.59 | N/A |
| Others | N/A | 1,982 | | |
| Turnout | | 44,592 | 54.86 | −3.90 |
2nd round result
| LREM | Guillaume Gouffier-Cha | 18,923 | 59.22 | N/A |
| UDI | Gildas Lecoq | 13,030 | 40.78 | N/A |
| Turnout | | 35,876 | 44.13 | −12.75 |
| LREM gain from EELV | | Swing | | |

=== 2012 ===
Legislative Election 2012: Val-de-Marne's 6th constituency
| Party | Candidate | Votes | % | ±% |
|---|---|---|---|---|
| UMP | Patrick Beaudouin | 16,929 | 36.92 | −8.37 |
| EELV | Laurence Abeille | 12,254 | 26.72 | +21.60 |
| FG | Nora Saint-Gal | 5,592 | 12.20 | N/A |
| DVG | David Dornbusch | 4,338 | 9.46 | N/A |
| FN | Marie-Christine Madiot | 3,159 | 6.89 | +4.46 |
| MoDem | Pierre Ramadier | 1,613 | 3.52 | −6.91 |
| Others | N/A | 1,968 | | |
| Turnout | | 45,853 | 58.76 | −2.96 |
2nd round result
| EELV | Laurence Abeille | 22,602 | 50.95 | N/A |
| UMP | Patrick Beaudouin | 21,758 | 49.05 | −4.59 |
| Turnout | | 44,360 | 56.88 | +0.84 |
| EELV gain from UMP | | | | |

=== 2007 ===
Legislative Election 2007: Val-de-Marne's 6th constituency
| Party | Candidate | Votes | % | ±% |
|---|---|---|---|---|
| UMP | Patrick Beaudouin | 21,593 | 45.29 | +13.12 |
| PS | David Doenbusch | 9,454 | 19.83 | N/A |
| DVG | Gilles Saint Gal | 5,361 | 11.24 | N/A |
| MoDem | Christian Ouvray | 4,974 | 10.43 | N/A |
| LV | Pierre Serne | 2,439 | 5.12 | −15.63 |
| FN | Gérard Margalle | 1,159 | 2.43 | −4.22 |
| Far left | Sylviane Gauthier | 962 | 2.02 | N/A |
| Others | N/A | 1,736 | | |
| Turnout | | 48,097 | 61.72 | −5.52 |
2nd round result
| UMP | Patrick Beaudouin | 22,816 | 53.64 | −3.37 |
| PS | David Doenbusch | 19,719 | 46.36 | N/A |
| Turnout | | 43,658 | 56.04 | −4.50 |
| UMP hold | | | | |

=== 2002 ===
Legislative Election 2002: Val-de-Marne's 6th constituency
| Party | Candidate | Votes | % | ±% |
|---|---|---|---|---|
| UMP | Patrick Beaudouin | 14,869 | 32.17 | −2.70 |
| LV | Pierre Serne | 9,590 | 20.75 | +16.39 |
| UDF | Patrick Gerard | 8,510 | 18.41 | N/A |
| PCF | Jean-Francois Voguet | 6,696 | 14.49 | −5.40 |
| FN | Jeannine Viaud | 3,075 | 6.65 | −5.35 |
| Others | N/A | 3,483 | | |
| Turnout | | 46,749 | 67.24 | +3.51 |
2nd round result
| UMP | Patrick Beaudouin | 23,234 | 57.01 | +2.93 |
| LV | Pierre Serne | 17,518 | 42.99 | N/A |
| Turnout | | 42,092 | 60.54 | −7.28 |
| UMP hold | | | | |

=== 1997 ===
Legislative Election 1997: Val-de-Marne's 6th constituency
| Party | Candidate | Votes | % | ±% |
|---|---|---|---|---|
| RPR | Michel Giraud | 15,121 | 34.87 | |
| PCF | Louis Bayeurte | 8,625 | 19.89 | |
| PS | Michel Morzière | 7,173 | 16.54 | |
| FN | Régine Mousson | 5,203 | 12.00 | |
| LV | Michèle Perrigueux-Carre | 1,893 | 4.36 | |
| DVD | Jean-Pierre Duchiron | 1,304 | 3.01 | |
| GE | Stéphane Pellier | 914 | 2.11 | |
| LO | Jacques Decoupy | 909 | 2.10 | |
| Others | N/A | 2,226 | | |
| Turnout | | 44,702 | 63.73 | |
2nd round result
| RPR | Michel Giraud | 24,516 | 54.08 | |
| PCF | Louis Bayeurte | 20,816 | 45.92 | |
| Turnout | | 47,570 | 67.82 | |
| RPR hold | | | | |

== Sources ==
Official results of French elections from 2002: "Résultats électoraux officiels en France" (in French).
