= Hélène Gassin =

French politician

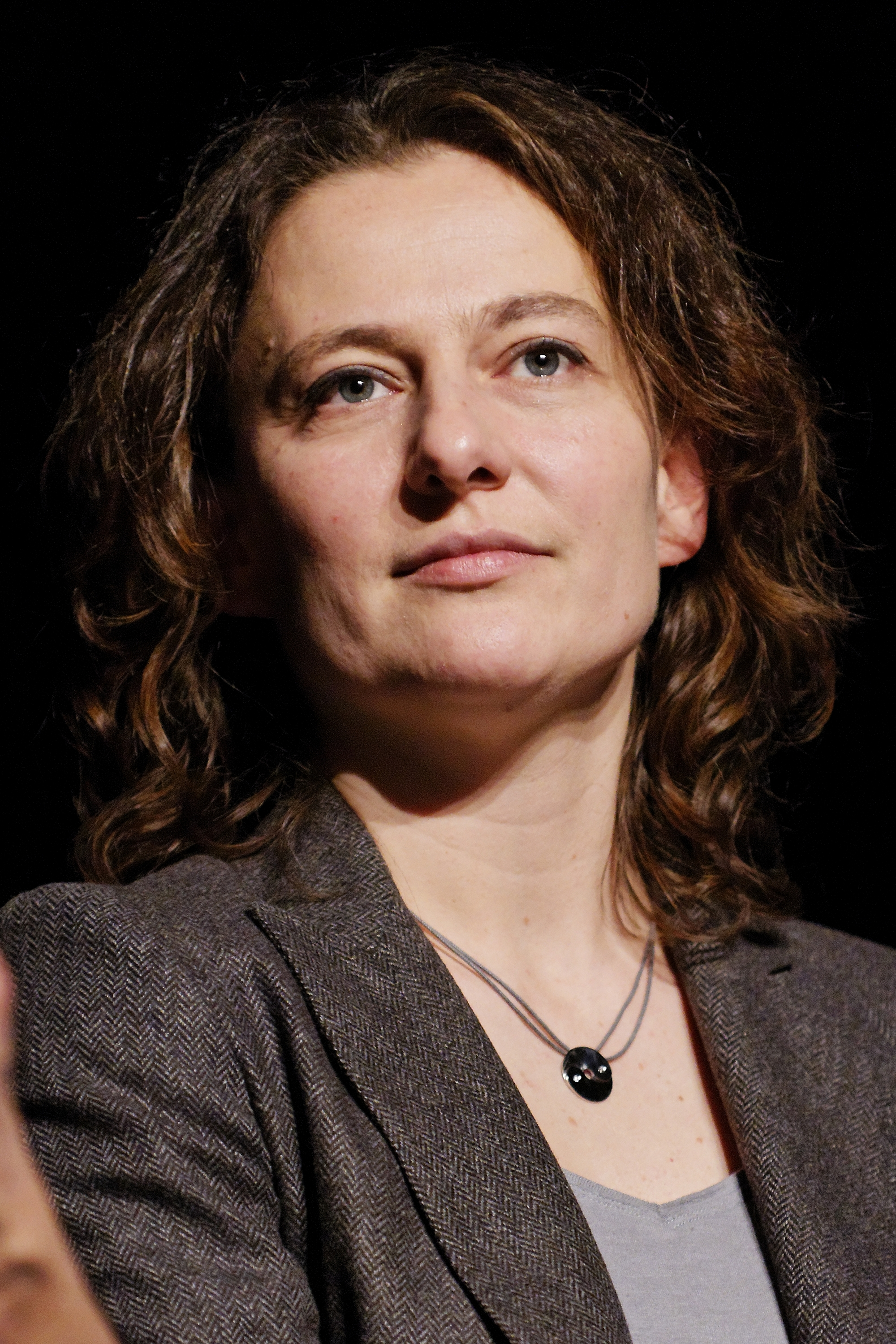
- Hélène Gassin at a public meeting in Antony for the 2010 French regional elections.

Vice-President of Council of European Energy Regulators
- President: Garett Blaney

Vice-President of the Regional Council of Île-de-France
- In office 2010–2015
- President: Jean-Paul Huchon

Personal details
- Born: September 25, 1975 (age 50)
- Party: EELV

Hélène Gassin (born September 25, 1975) is a French politician. She was appointed as the fourth vice-president of the Île-de-France regional council, with the delegation as minister for the environment, agriculture and energy.

== Biography ==
Master of Science and Technology in environmental management, she was in charge of the Energy campaign at Greenpeace France from 1998 to 2006. She also participated in the creation of Enercoop. She was a member of negaWatt and Global Chance associations and an independent consultant in energy-environment issues when she joined Europe Ecology in September 2008. She coordinated the development of the “Green Contract for Europe”.

She was a candidate for Europe Ecology in the regional elections of 2010, on the list presented in Hauts-de-Seine, the head of which was Pierre Larrouturou. She was thus elected regional councilor for Île-de-France. She contributed to the objectives and the creation of SEM Énergie POSIT'IF, of which she was Chairman of the Supervisory Board.

She was a member of the executive board of EELV from the creation of the political party in 2010 until March 2013. During the 2012 presidential campaign, Hélène Gassin was the “Energy and climate” advisor to EELV candidate Éva Joly.

In 2017, she was appointed the vice-president of Council of European Energy Regulators (CEER) by Energy Regulatory Commission (CRE).

Since June 2019, she is a consultant in territorial energy strategies.

== Publications and appearances ==
=== Bibliography ===
- So Watt? L’énergie: une affaire de citoyens, with Benjamin Dessus, Paris, Éditions de l'Aube, 2004 (ISBN 2-7526-0075-5)
- Cosmopolitiques, N^{o} 9: Cette énergie qui nous manque, with Dominique Boullier, Yves Cochet, Bernard Laponche, Paris, Éditions Apogée, 2005 (ISBN 978-2-84398-184-5)

=== Appearances ===
Hélène Gassin was represented in an interview with the Saison Brune comic strip, published in 2012.
