= Regional Council of Île-de-France =

Regional legislature of Île-de-France, France

Regional Council of Île-de-France Conseil régional d'Île-de-France
- Logo of Île-de-France region

Type
- Type: Unicameral

Leadership
- President: Valérie Pécresse, LR since 18 December 2015

Structure
- Seats: 209
- Political groups: Executive (125): The Republicans (102); Union of Democrats and Independents (23); Opposition (84): Socialist Party (19); Europe Ecology - The Greens (18); National Rally (15); Ensemble Citoyens (15); La France Insoumise (10); French Communist Party (7)

Elections
- Last general election: 27 June 2021
- Next election: March 2028

Meeting place
- Saint-Ouen-sur-Seine

The Regional Council of Île-de-France (French: Conseil régional d'Île-de-France) is the regional council of Île-de-France, France's most populous administrative region. Made up of 209 regional councillors elected for 6 years, it is headquartered in Saint-Ouen-sur-Seine, just north of Paris. The council has been presided over since 18 December 2015 by Valérie Pécresse. She succeeded Jean-Paul Huchon, who had presided over the council since 23 March 1998.

== Finances ==
Administrative accounts of the Region (in million euros)
	2015	2016	2017	2018	2019
Revenue excluding loans	4,209	4,075	4,174	4,305	4,541
Loans	712	650	530	600	200
Functionary costs	2,780	2,678	2,636	2,553	2,543
Investment expenditure	2,138	2,047	2,150	2,108	2,235
Outstanding debt	5,363	5,577	5,587	5,660	5,384

== List of presidents of the Regional Council ==
#	President	Party	Took office	Left office	Other positions held
1	Michel Giraud	RPR	1976	1988	Professeur du lettres; Vice President of the General Council of Val-de-Marne (1977 → 1988); Mayor of Le Perreux-sur-Marne (1971 → 1992)
2	Pierre-Charles Krieg	RPR	1988	1992	Lawyer; Mayor of the 4th arrondissement of Paris (1983 → 1997)
3	Michel Giraud	RPR	1992	1998	Professeur du lettres; Deputy of Val-de-Marne (1995 → 2002); Mayor of Le Perreux-sur-Marne (1971 → 1992)
4	Jean-Paul Huchon	PS	15 March 1998	17 December 2015	Civil administrator; Mayor of Conflans-Sainte-Honorine (1994 → 2001)
5	Valérie Pécresse	LR, SL	18 December 2015	Incumbent	Master of Requests to the Council of State; Member of Yvelines (2002 → 2007 and 2012 → 2016)

== Current composition ==
=== Assembly ===
List of political groups in the council
Party	Acronym	Elected	Group	President
Majority (125 seats)
The Republicans	LR	59	Île-de-France gathered (102 seats)	Vincent Jeanbrun
Miscellaneous right	DVD	14	Île-de-France gathered (102 seats)	Vincent Jeanbrun
The Republicans-Soyons libres	LR-SL	11	Île-de-France gathered (102 seats)	Vincent Jeanbrun
Democratic Movement	MoDem	8	Île-de-France gathered (102 seats)	Vincent Jeanbrun
Radical Party	PRV	2	Île-de-France gathered (102 seats)	Vincent Jeanbrun
Agir	Agir	2	Île-de-France gathered (102 seats)	Vincent Jeanbrun
Horizons	Horizons	2	Île-de-France gathered (102 seats)	Vincent Jeanbrun
The Centrists	LC	1	Île-de-France gathered (102 seats)	Vincent Jeanbrun
Union of Democrats and Ecologists	UDE	1	Île-de-France gathered (102 seats)	Vincent Jeanbrun
Independent Ecological Movement	MEI	1	Île-de-France gathered (102 seats)	Vincent Jeanbrun
La France Vraiment	LFV	1	Île-de-France gathered (102 seats)	Vincent Jeanbrun
Union of Democrats and Independents	UDI	23	UDI (23 seats)	Jean-Francois Vigier
Opposition (84 seats)
Europe Ecology - The Greens	EELV	11	Ecologist pole (18 seats)	Ghislaine Senée
Génération.s	G s	5	Ecologist pole (18 seats)	Ghislaine Senée
Cap Écologie	CE	1	Ecologist pole (18 seats)	Ghislaine Senée
Ecology Generation	GÉ	1	Ecologist pole (18 seats)	Ghislaine Senée
Socialist Party	PS	16	Socialist, Ecologist and Radical Group (19 seats)	Jonathan Kienzlen
Radical Party of the Left	PRG	1	Socialist, Ecologist and Radical Group (19 seats)	Jonathan Kienzlen
Miscellaneous left	DVG	1	Socialist, Ecologist and Radical Group (19 seats)	Jonathan Kienzlen
Les Écolos Solidaires	LÉS	1	Socialist, Ecologist and Radical Group (19 seats)	Jonathan Kienzlen
National Rally	RN	15	RN Ile-de-France (16 seats)	Wallerand de Saint-Just
L'Avenir Français	LAF	1	RN Ile-de-France (16 seats)	Wallerand de Saint-Just
La République En Marche!	LREM	9	Presidential majority (15 seats)	Laurent Saint-Martin
Democratic movement	MoDem	4	Presidential majority (15 seats)	Laurent Saint-Martin
Territories of Progress	TdP	1	Presidential majority (15 seats)	Laurent Saint-Martin
Agir	Agir	1	Presidential majority (15 seats)	Laurent Saint-Martin
La France Insoumise	LFI	9	LFI and related (10 seats)	Paul Vannier
Animalist Party	PA	1	LFI and related (10 seats)	Paul Vannier
French Communist Party	PCF	7	Communist left, ecologist and citizen (7 seats)	Céline Malaisé

=== Vice-presidencies ===
The new executive formed in 2021 has, in addition to the president, fifteen vice-presidents.

List of vice-presidents of the Île-de-France regional council
Order	Name	Party	Departmental constituency	Charge(s)	Other mandate
1st	Jean-Didier Berger	SL	Hauts-de-Seine	Finances, Evaluation of public policies and European Fund.	Mayor of Clamart; President of the regional public establishment Vallée Sud - Grand Paris
2nd	Othman Nasrou	SL - LR	Yvelines	Youth, Republicanism, Guidance and professional integration, Higher education and Research.	
3rd	Alexandra Dublanche	LR	Yvelines	Recovery, Attractiveness, Economic Development and Innovation.	Deputy Mayor of Sartrouville
4th	Jean-Philippe Dugoin-Clement	UDI - PR	Essonne	Housing, sustainable land use planning and SDRIFE.	Mayor of Mennecy
5th	Marie-Carole Ciuntu	LR - SL	Val-de-Marne	General administration, Social dialogue and Digital transformation.	Mayor of Sucy-en-Brie
6th	Patrick Karam	LR	Paris	Sports, JOP, Leisure, Citizenship, City policy and Associative life.	
7th	Farida Adlani	MoDem	Seine-Saint-Denis	Solidarity, Health and Family.	Mayor of Villepinte
8th	Yann Wehrling	MoDem	Paris	Ecological transition, Climate and Biodiversity.	
9th	Florence Portelli	SL	Val-d'Oise	Culture, Heritage and Creation.	Mayor of Taverny
10th	Frédéric Péchenard	LR	Paris	Security and Victim Assistance.	Paris Councilor
11th	Sylvie Mariaud	UDI	Hauts-de-Seine	Social and solidarity economy and responsible purchasing.	Deputy Mayor of Bois-Colombes
12th	Stephane Beaudet	DVD	Essonne	Transport.	Mayor of Évry-Courcouronnes
13th	Valérie Lacroute	LR	Seine-et-Marne	Agriculture and Food.	Mayor of Nemours
14th	James Cheron	UDI	Seine-et-Marne	High schools.	Mayor of Montereau-Fault-Yonne
15th	Marie-Do Aeschlimann	LR	Seine-et-Marne	Employment and vocational training.	Deputy mayor of Asnières-sur-Seine

=== Special Delegates ===
Valérie Pécresse also appointed 18 special delegates in charge of “strategic issues”:

Special Delegates
Delegates	Charge(s)
Grégoire de Lasteyrie	Sustainable Mobility
Hamida Rezeg	Tourism
Pierre Deniziot	Republican Promise, Handicap and Accessibility
Babette de Rozières	Gastronomy
Frédéric Valletoux	Rurality, Commerce, Handicrafts and Rural Contracts
Sophie Deschiens	Circular Region and Animal Friend
Laurent Jeanne	Urban Renovation and City Policy
Marianne Duranton	Organic and Short Circuits
Jérémy Redler	Major International Events and Trade Shows
Nelly Garnier	Smart Region
Anne-Louise Mesadieu	Solidarity Development
Olivier Blond	Fight against air pollution
Yasmine Camara	Olympic and Paralympic Games
Charlotte Baelde	Gender Equality
Ludovic Toro	Fight against medical desertification
Faten Hidri	Fight against early school leaving
Daniel-Georges Courtois	Evaluation of public policies, Certification of Accounts and Management of European Funds and Evaluation Committee
Pascal Pelain	Relations with the Greater Paris Metropolis

== Headquarters ==
A selection process led in May 2016 to retain three potential sites, where the move could be done quickly, in Ivry-sur-Seine, Saint-Denis and Saint-Ouen. In early 2018, the construction of the new site started in the district of Docks in Saint-Ouen, moving from its previous office in the 7th arrondissement. The second building, including a hemicycle, was delivered in 2019. The first plenary meeting of the regional council in Saint-Ouen was announced to be held in March 2020. The site is served by Mairie de Saint-Ouen Paris Métro station.

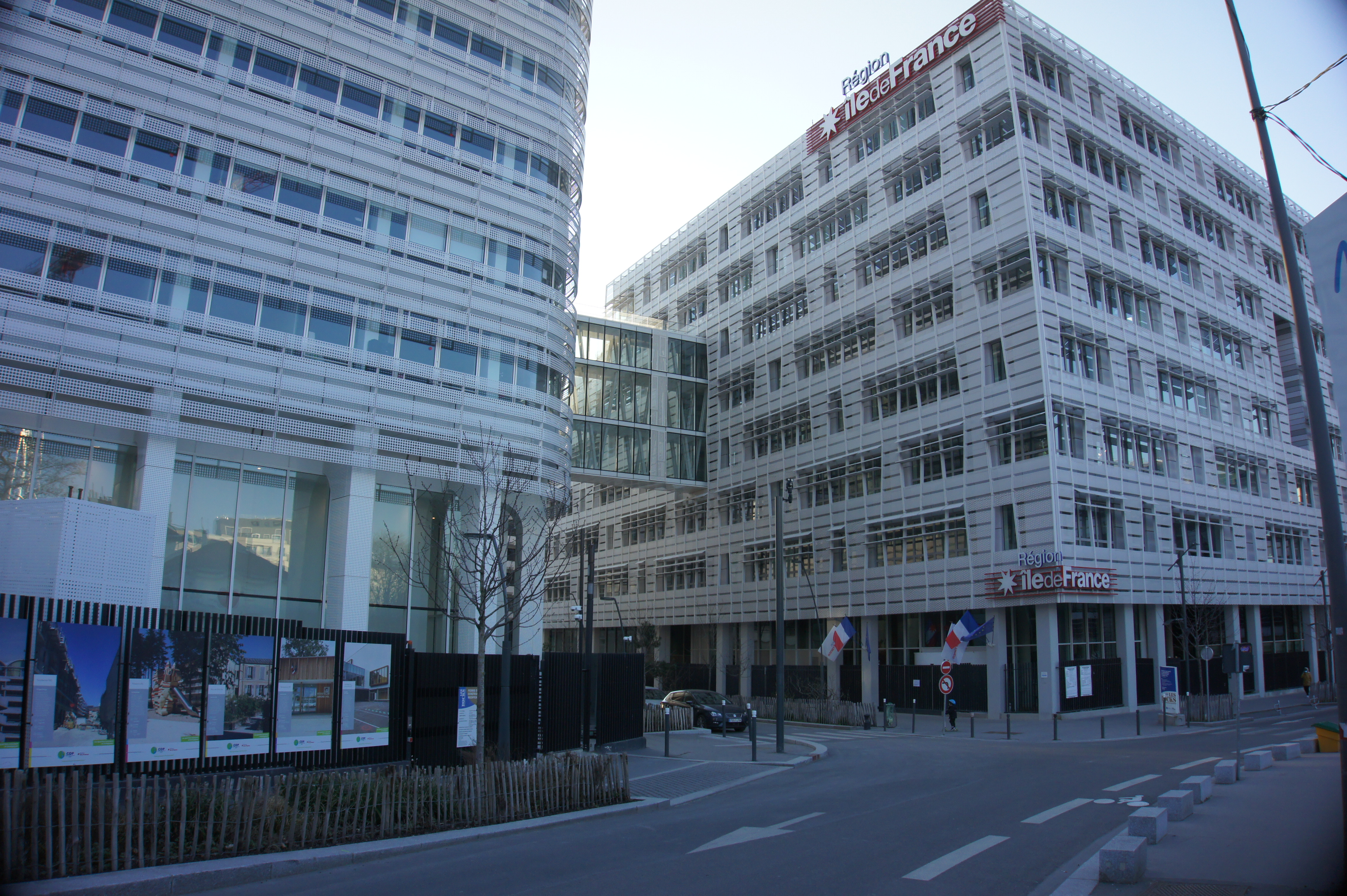
Current seat of the regional council, 2 rue Simone-Veil in Saint-Ouen-sur-Seine.

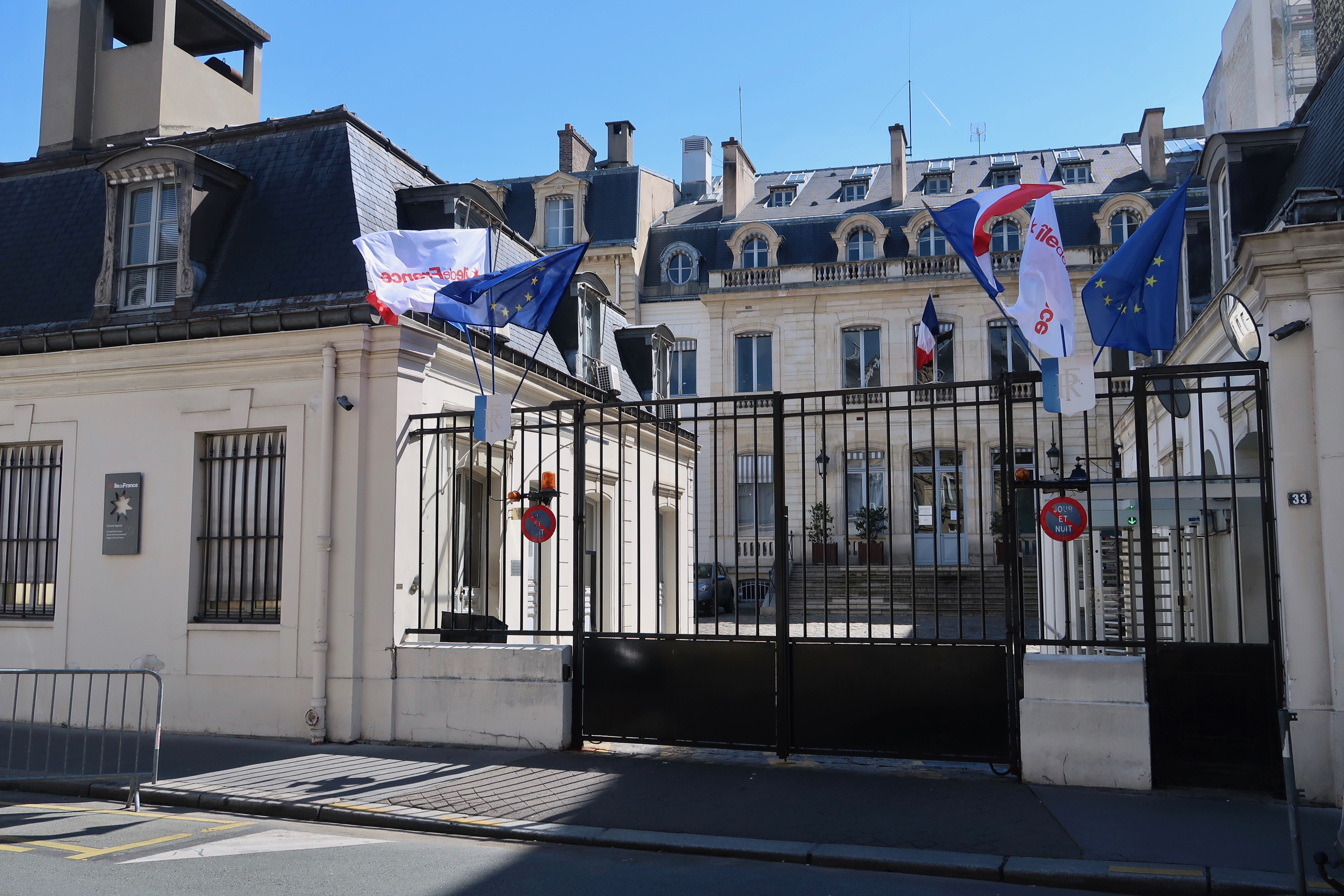
Former seat of the regional council in rue Barbet-de-Jouy (7th arrondissement).

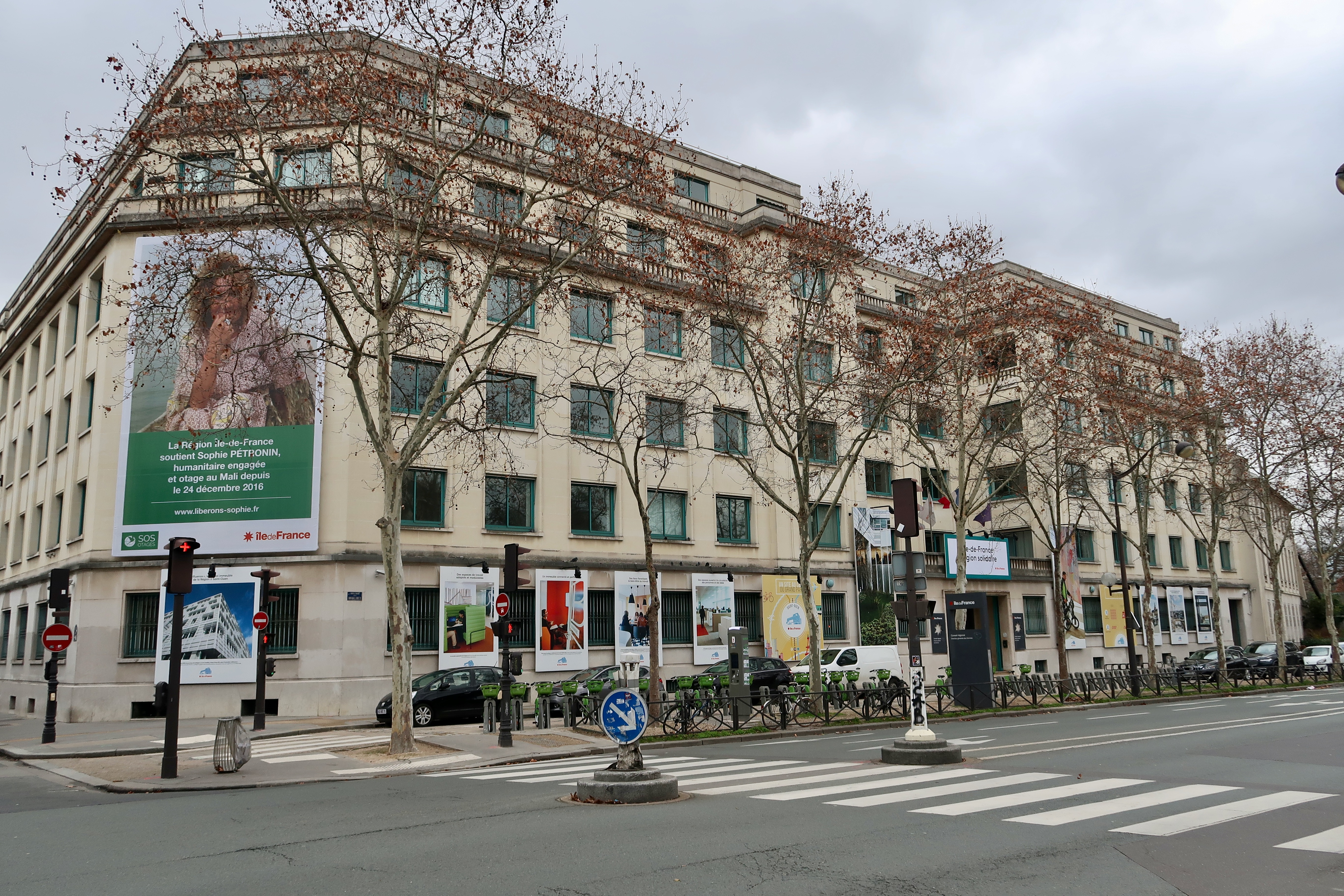
Former building of the Services Department, 35 boulevard des Invalides.

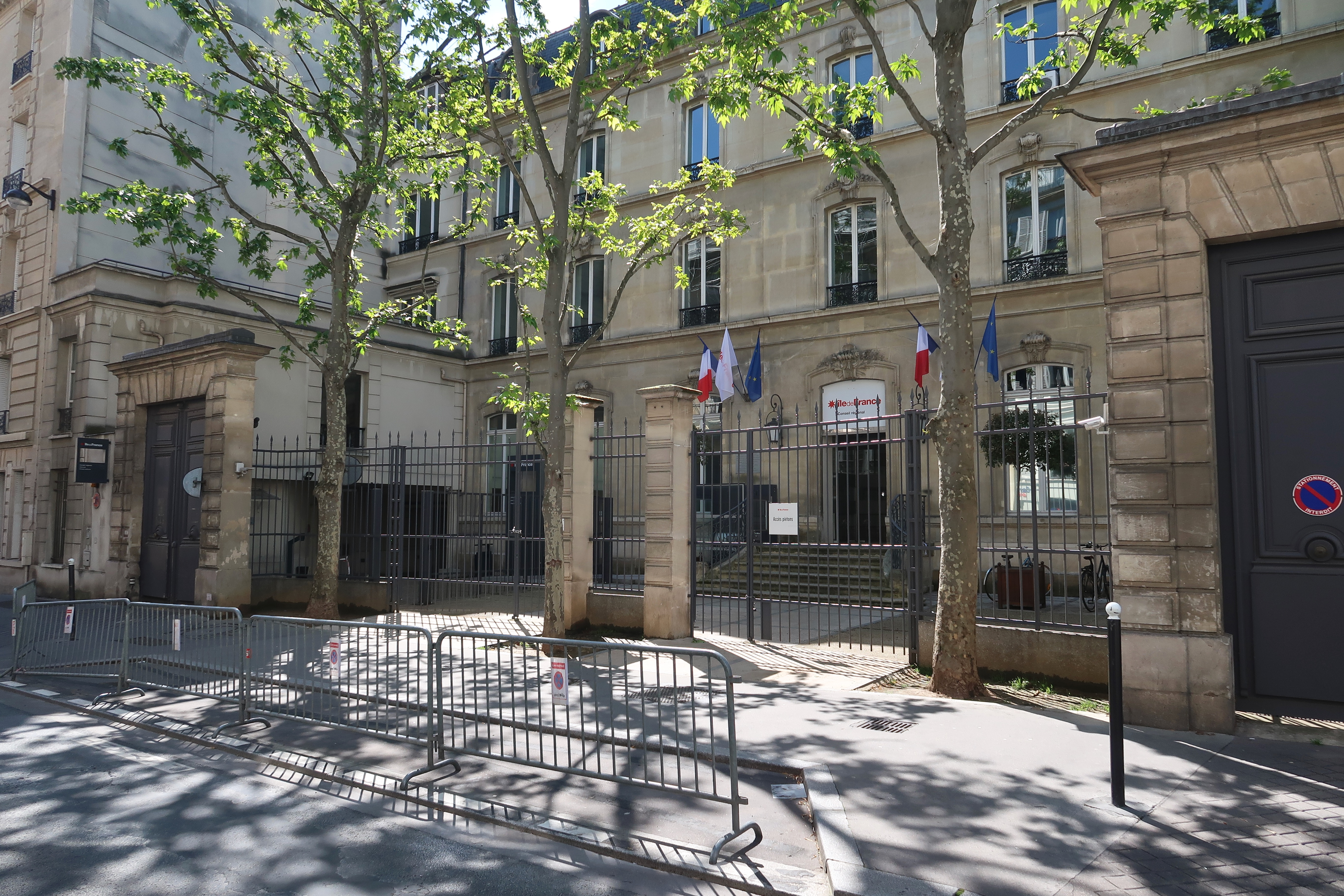
Former building in 57 rue de Babylone

== Visual identity (logo) ==
Logo of Île-de-France from 2005 to 2019.

Official 2019 logo of Île-de-France

Since 2005, the logo of the Île-de-France region has been composed of an eight-pointed star of red-orange color next to the name of the region in lowercase. The eight branches of the star, already present on the previous logo, symbolized the eight Île-de-France départements. The creation of the logo would have costed 40,000 euros and the change of letterhead that it entailed more than 100,000 euros.

== Regional Councilors' Scarf ==
The scarf worn by the regional councilors who are members of the Île-de-France Regional Council is red (narrow band), white (narrow band), blue, white (narrow band), red (narrow band).

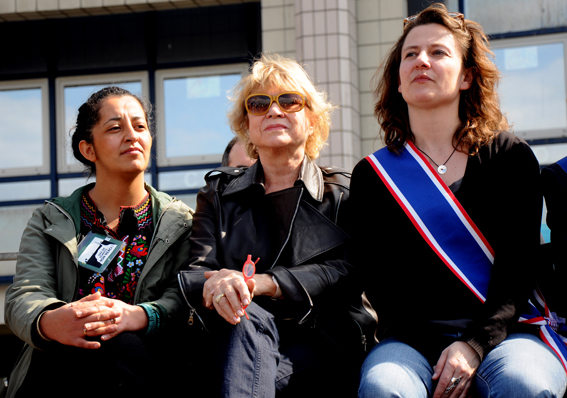
Regional councilor Hélène Gassin wearing the scarf (2011).

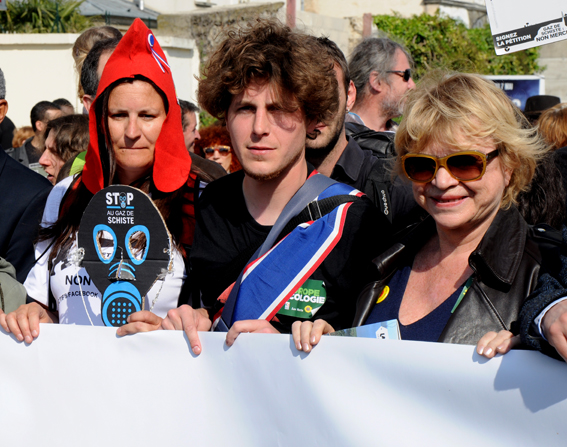
The regional councilor Julien Bayou girds his scarf, worn by mistake on the left shoulder (2011).

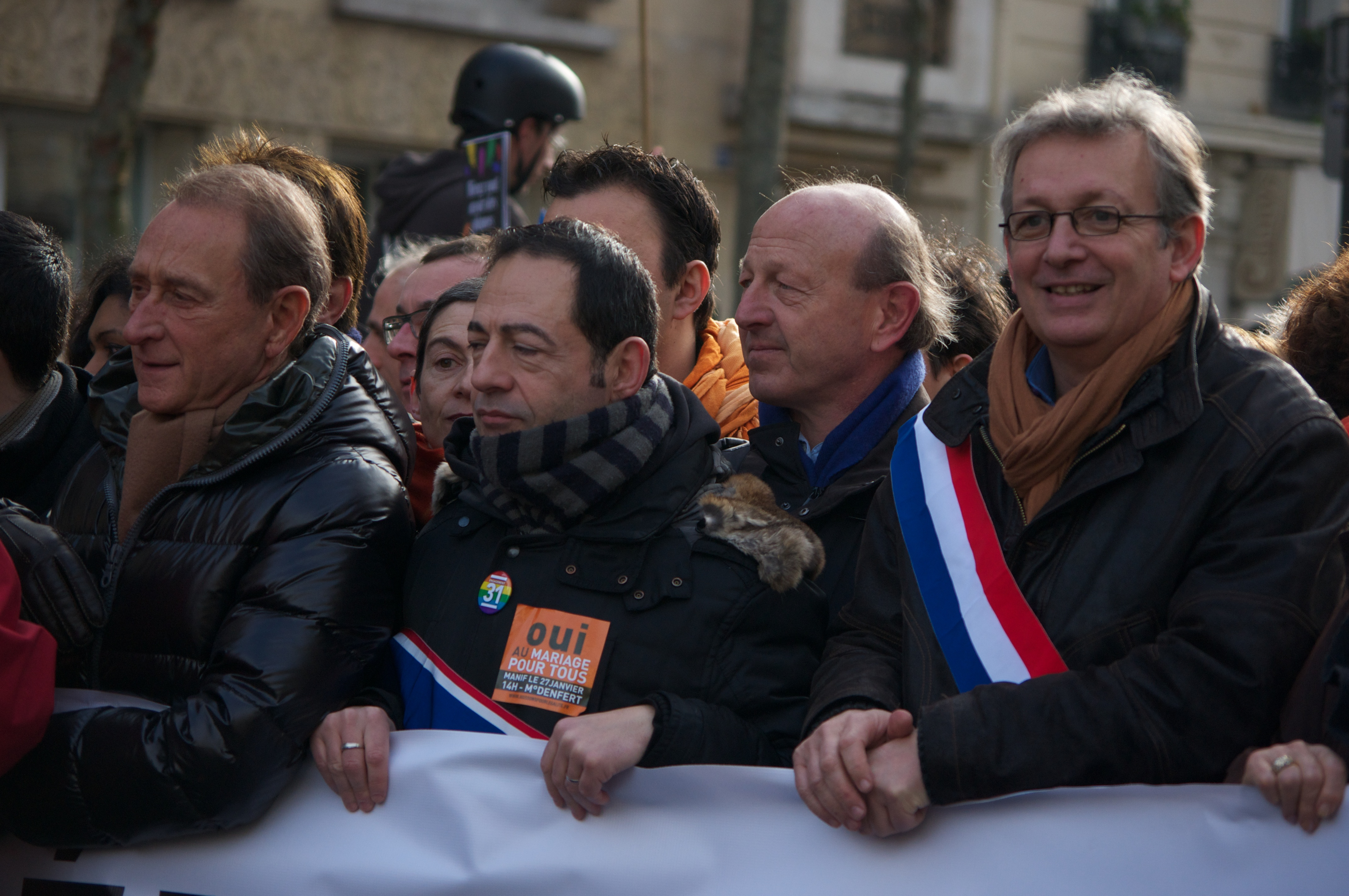
Regional councilor Jean-Luc Romero girds his scarf (2013).

== Regional Youth Council of Île-de-France ==
The Conseil régional des jeunes d'Île-de-France (CRJ or transl. Regional Youth Council of Île-de-France) is an assembly created by the regional council of Île-de-France. It is made up of 148 full advisors.

The advisers meet in plenary session in the hemicycle of the regional council 3 times a year and sit on several committees:

- Guidance, Studies, Employment
- Transport
- Europe
- Health
- Commission Against Discrimination
- Gender Equality

In plenary session, 2 voluntary moderators are drawn to lead this session.
