= Prisca Thevenot =

French politician (born 1985)

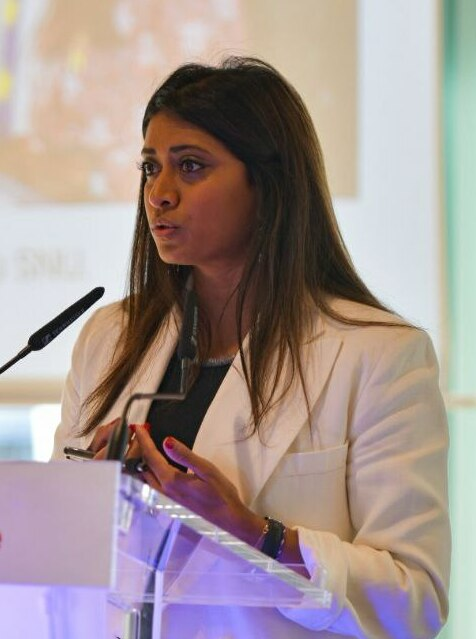
- Thevenot in 2023

Minister Delegate for Democratic Renewal Spokesperson of the Government
- In office 11 January 2024 – 16 July 2024
- Prime Minister: Gabriel Attal
- Preceded by: Olivier Véran
- Succeeded by: Maud Bregeon

Member of the National Assembly for Hauts-de-Seine's 8th constituency
- Incumbent
- Assumed office 8 July 2024
- Preceded by: Virginie Lanlo
- In office 22 June 2022 – 20 August 2023
- Preceded by: Jacques Maire
- Succeeded by: Virginie Lanlo

Secretary of State for Youth and the National Universal Service
- In office 20 July 2023 – 11 January 2024
- Prime Minister: Élisabeth Borne
- Minister: Gabriel Attal
- Preceded by: Sarah El Haïry
- Succeeded by: Sarah El Haïry (as Minister Delegate)

Member of the Regional Council of Île-de-France
- Incumbent
- Assumed office 2 July 2021
- President: Valérie Pécresse

Personal details
- Born: Prisca Balasubramanem; 1 March 1985 (age 41) Strasbourg, France
- Party: Renaissance
- Children: 2
- Education: Emlyon Business School

Prisca Thevenot, née Balasubramanem (French: [pʁiska tevəno]; born 1 March 1985), is a French politician of Renaissance, who served in the Borne government as secretary of state for youth and the National Universal Service between July 2023 and January 2024, then in the Attal government as Minister Delegate for Democratic Renewal and Spokesperson of the Government, between January and July 2024.

Thevenot previously served as spokesperson for Renaissance from November 2020. She was elected deputy for Hauts-de-Seine's 8th constituency in the 2022 legislative election.

== Early life and education ==
Thevenot was born in Strasbourg to Mauritian parents who settled in France at the end of the 1970s to pursue university studies. In 1987, the family moved to the Paris region.

She completed a classe préparatoire aux grandes écoles at Lycée Saint-Louis-de-Gonzague, and continued her studies at the EM Lyon Business School, from which she graduated in 2009.

== Political career ==
In the 2017 legislative election, Prisca Thevenot contested Seine-Saint-Denis's 4th constituency, but was defeated by incumbent communist member Marie-George Buffet.

In November 2020, Thevenot was appointed spokeswoman for Emmanuel Macron’s party, La République en marche (LaREM), jointly with Maud Bregeon.

In the June 2021 regional election, she was elected to the Regional Council of Île-de-France for Seine-Saint-Denis, on the list led by Laurent Saint-Martin.

In the 2022 legislative election, Thevenot ran in Hauts-de-Seine's 8th constituency for LaREM’s Together coalition. She won the most votes in the first round, and was elected deputy in the second round with 65,75% of the votes cast, against Annie Larroque Comoy (LFI - NUPES). She became a member of the Social Affairs Committee in the National Assembly.

In July 2023, Thevenot was appointed secretary of state for youth and the National Universal Service in the Borne government, a junior position jointly under the minister of the armed forces and the minister of national education and youth.

In the Attal government formed in January 2024, she became deputy minister for democratic renewal and spokeswoman of the Government.

In April 2024, eight members of her team resigned. Six of them spoke to the newspaper Le Monde to complain of repeated moral harassment and humiliation.

On 3 July 2024, while Thevenot and a supporter were putting up campaign posters for the 2024 French legislative election in Meudon, they were attacked by man screaming “By the Quran, get everyone here!” who was soon joined by 20 others. The attack was premeditated. Several suspects were arrested. Thevenot’s deputy and a supporter were hospitalized, the latter with a broken jaw.

== Personal life ==
Thevenot is married and has two children.

== See also ==
- List of deputies of the 16th National Assembly of France
