= Jean-Luc Romero =

French politician (born 1959)

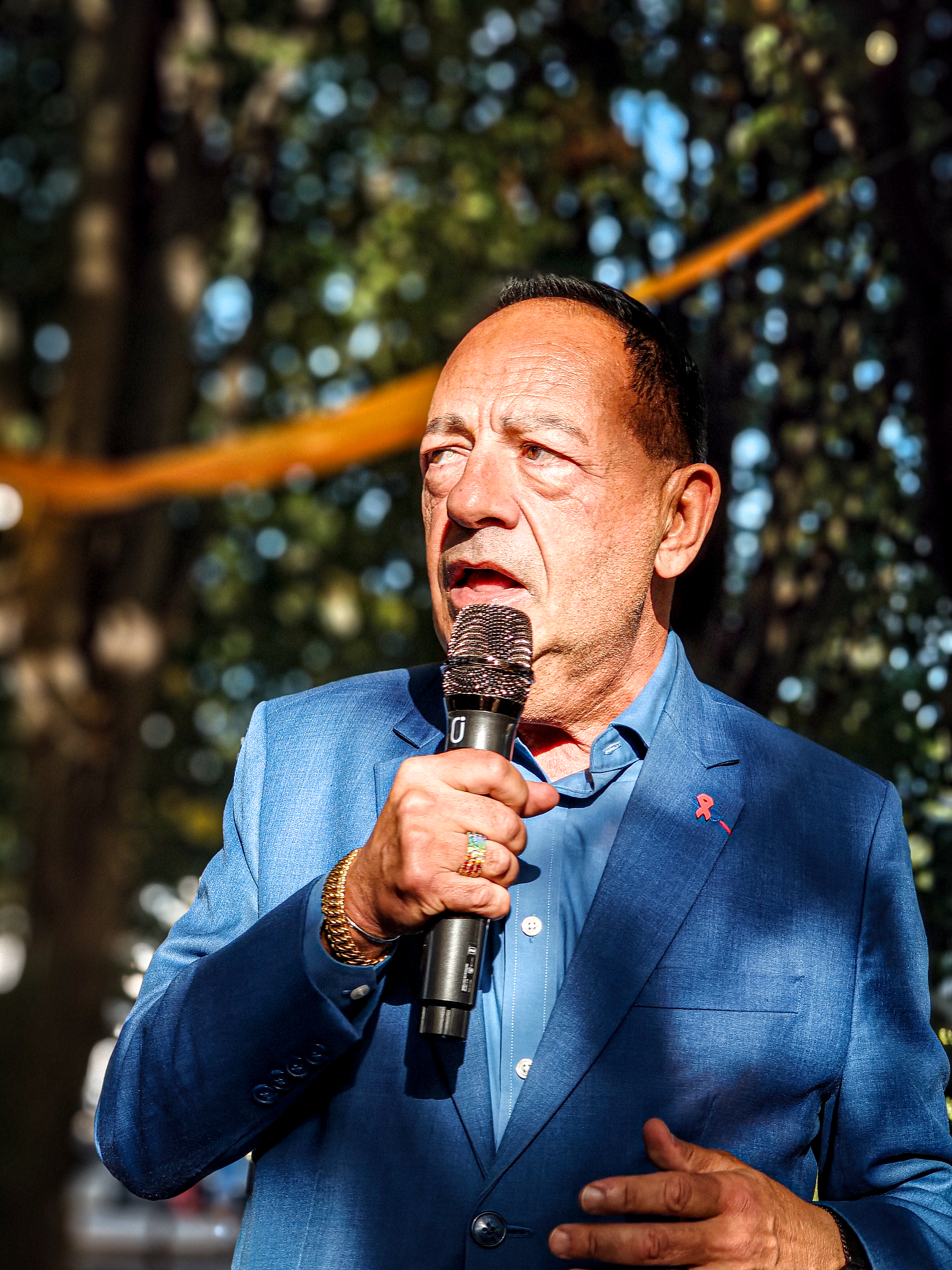

Member of the Regional Council of Île-de-France
- Incumbent
- Assumed office 20 March 1998
- President: Jean-Paul Huchon; Valérie Pécresse

Personal details
- Born: 30 June 1959 (age 67) Béthune, France
- Party: Socialist Party
- Spouse: Christophe Michel (m. 2013–2018)
- Education: Panthéon-Assas University
- Occupation: Politician; Writer

Jean-Luc Romero (born 30 June 1959) is a French politician, writer and NGO leader.

== Biography ==
Jean-Luc Romero was born in Béthune in the Pas-de-Calais region (France) on June 30, 1959. His father was a Spaniard and his mother French of Spanish descent.

He has many activities in the field of politics and non-profitable organizations, both of which are targeting the human being as the same goal.

He is the first and the only French politician to have reveal his HIV-infection, which he did in May 2002, in a book called Virus de Vie (Virus of life).

== Political career ==
In May 2002, Jean-Luc Romero became the first French politician who revealed having AIDS.

He is a former national Secretary of UMP about AIDS. He joined Socialist Party in December 2009 and was elected with Anne Hidalgo in Jean-Paul Huchon's campaign.

He is a regional councillor of the Ile-de- France region. He has been in office since 1998.

He is deputy-mayor of Paris 12th in charge of culture and tourism, a title he has held since May 2014.

== Fight for a dignified death ==
He is president of ADMD (association pour le Droit de Mourir dans la Dignité) which is a Right-To-Die-society, created in 1980 and reaching nearly 60.000 members today. ADMD is fighting for the right of every human being to decide when and how to die from the moment he/ she is about to lose his/her dignity according to his/her own perception. ADMD has brought about significant changes in the current end-of-life legislation. Its ultimate goal however is to achieve the legalization of euthanasia. He is a former member of the board of the World Federation of right to die societies (WFRtDS) who co-organized the 17th world conference about euthanasia in Paris. He is the founder of the International Day for the Right to Die with Dignity on November 2.

== Fight against AIDS ==
For over 20 years, Jean-Luc Romero is an activist in the fight against AIDS. In May 2002, Jean-Luc Romero became the first French politician who revealed having AIDS.; He is president and founder of the ELCS Association (Local Elected against Aids : 13.000 local elected in this society), President of the Crips Ile-de-France (an organization which aims at fighting aids in the Ile-de-France region and educating high school students). The Crips Ile-de-France coordinates the stand of France during the international conferences about AIDS. He is also a member of the National Council AIDS.

In 2004, he convinced the Prime Minister to declare AIDS as a national priority and became president of the group responsible for managing this year.

Since 2006, Jean-Luc Romero began a great movement against restrictions on freedom of movement and settlement imposed by many states of the United Nations for people living with HIV / AIDS in 2014, 41 countries impose such discrimination. A first success is achieved in January 2010 with the change of legislation in the United States. This development was followed by another equally important: China now allows people living with HIV to enter its territory.

== Fight for equal rights ==
He fought vigorously to have homophobic remarks as severely punished as racist ones. He wrote the books « On m' a volé ma vérité » (my truth was stolen from me) and « Homopoliticus, comme ils disent " (Homopoliticus, as they say) about this issue. As president of Crips Ile-de–France, he fights homophobia and hiv-aids phobia amongst the young. He is elected gay of the year 2011 by the readers of Yagg.fr. He fought also for the legalization of marriage for all and He married Christophe Michel, 27 September 2013 at the town hall of the 12th arrondissement of Paris. The ceremony was presided over by the mayor of Paris, Bertrand Delanoë.

== Books ==
- Ma mort m'appartient - 100% des Français vont mourir, les politiques le savent-ils (My death belongs to me - 100% of French people are going to die. Do politicians know it?)Editions Michalon, avril 2015
- Monsieur le président, laissez-nous mourir dans la dignité!, Jean-Claude Gawsewitch Editeur, septembre 2013
- Homo Politicus : Politique et homosexualité de 1960 à nos jours, Paris, Éditions Florent-Massot, 2011. Ré-édité en 2012 aux éditions Gaies et Lesbiennes-La Cerisaie
- Les voleurs de liberté : une loi de liberté sur la fin de vie pour tous les Français ! - Éditions Florent-Massot, septembre 2009
- La Nuit des petits couteaux : qui gagnera la bataille de Paris ? - Jean-Claude Gawsewitch Éditeur, février 2006
- Je n'ai jamais connu Amsterdam au printemps, Ramsay, septembre 2004
- Contribution à Addictions et toxicomanie, éditions Frison Roche, septembre 2004
- Lettre à une droite maladroite, Ramsay, mars 2003
- Virus de vie, Éditions Florent-Massot, Présente, mai 2002
- On m'a volé ma vérité, Le Seuil, juin 2001

== Movies ==
Homopoliticus, written with Aleksandar Dzerdz, INA editions 2013

== Distinctions ==
He is Knight of the Legion of Honour, the National Order of Merit and the Ordre des Arts et des Lettres (Fine Arts). Elected politician of the year 2001 by the readers of VSD. Gay of the year (2011) by the readers of yagg.fr. MDV Awards 2012 for his involvement in the fight against aids.

== See also ==
- Monique Mayère
