= Jacques Maire =

French politician (born 1962)

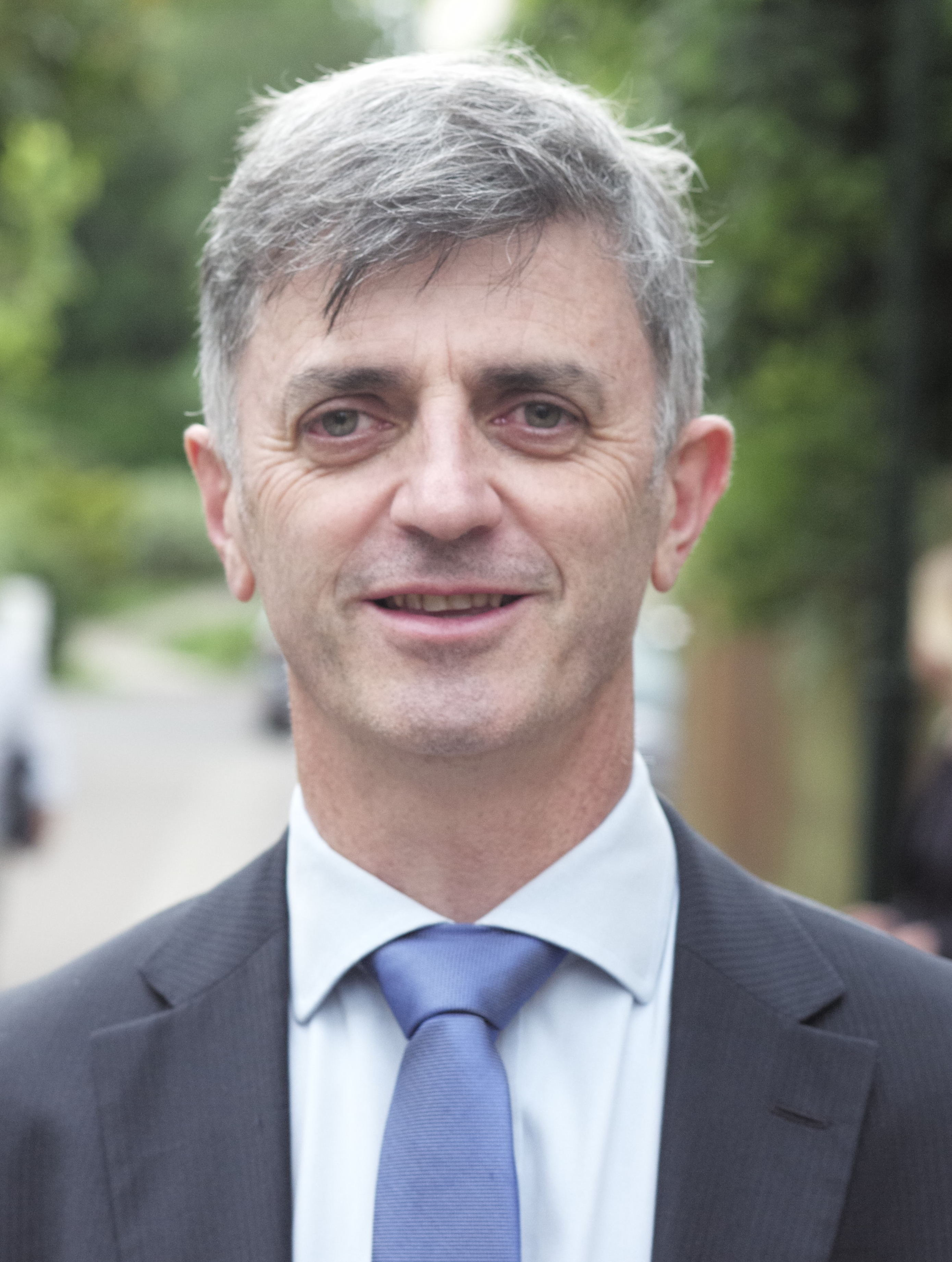

Member of the National Assembly for Hauts-de-Seine's 8th constituency
- In office 21 June 2017 – 21 June 2022
- Preceded by: Jean-Jacques Guillet
- Succeeded by: Prisca Thévenot

Personal details
- Born: 4 April 1962 (age 64) Enghien-les-Bains, France
- Party: La République En Marche! (since 2016)
- Other political affiliations: Socialist Party (until 2016)
- Parent: Edmond Maire (father)
- Education: Paris Dauphine University; Sciences Po; École nationale d'administration

Jacques Maire (French pronunciation: [ʒak mɛːʁ]; born 4 April 1962) is a French politician who represented the 8th constituency of the Hauts-de-Seine department in the National Assembly from 2017 to 2022. He is a member of La République En Marche! (LREM).

== Career ==
In Parliament, Maire serves as deputy chairman of the Committee on Foreign Affairs. He is also a member of the Franco-Japanese Friendship Group and the Franco-Australian Friendship Group.

In addition to his committee assignments, Maire has been a member of the French delegation to the Parliamentary Assembly of the Council of Europe since 2017. In this capacity, he serves on the Committee on Political Affairs and Democracy and as the Assembly's rapporteur on Algeria (2019) and the poisoning of Alexei Navalny (2020).

In September 2018, after François de Rugy's appointment to the government, Maire supported Barbara Pompili's candidacy for the presidency of the National Assembly. Since 2020, he has been serving as his parliamentary group's co-rapporteur on the government's pension reform plans, alongside Guillaume Gouffier-Cha, Carole Grandjean and Corinne Vignon. He co-founded a new political party alongside Pompili; En Commun in 2020.

In April 2021, Maire was included in a list of eight public officials that were banned by Russia's Ministry of Foreign Affairs from entering the country in retaliation for EU sanctions on Russians.

== Political positions ==
In 2019, Maire voted in favour of the French ratification of the European Union's Comprehensive Economic and Trade Agreement (CETA) with Canada. In 2020, Maire co-authored (along with Michèle Tabarot) a parliamentary report recommending tighter parliamentary oversight of government decisions on arms exports.

== See also ==
- 2017 French legislative election
