= Edmond Maire =

French labor union leader from 1971-1988

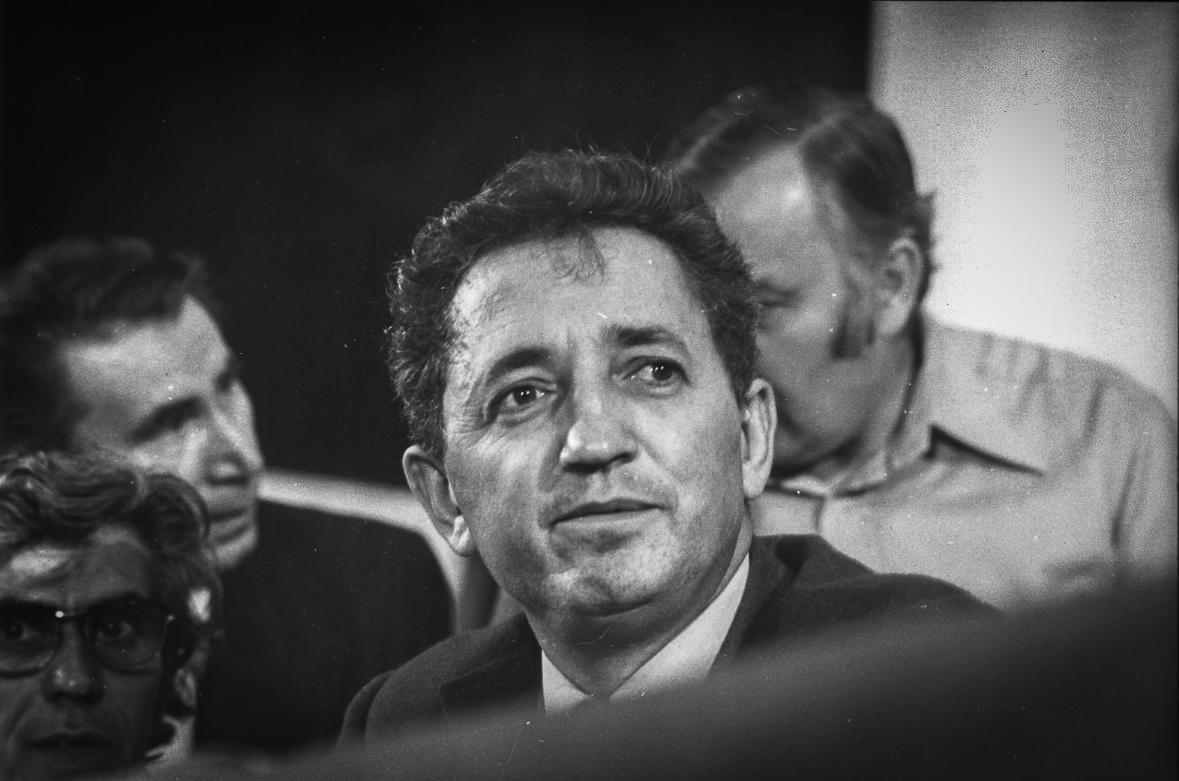
- Edmond Maire in 1978

General Secretary of the CFDT
- In office 1971–1988
- Preceded by: Eugène Descamps
- Succeeded by: Jean Kaspar

Personal details
- Born: Edmond Louis Marie Maire; 24 January 1931 Épinay-sur-Seine, France
- Died: 1 October 2017 (aged 86) Paris, France
- Children: Jacques Maire
- Education: Lycée Jacques-Decour
- Alma mater: CNAM

Edmond Maire (French pronunciation: [ɛdmɔ̃ mɛːʁ]; 24 January 1931 – 1 October 2017) was a French labor union leader. He was the secretary general of the French Democratic Confederation of Labour (CFDT) from 1971 to 1988. He was dismissive of strike actions and supported a more equal division of labour.

== Early life ==
Edmond Maire was born on 24 January 1931 in Épinay-sur-Seine near Paris. His father was a railroad employee for the SNCF at the Gare du Nord, and his mother was a housewife. He was raised as a devout Roman Catholic alongside six siblings.

Maire was educated at the Collège-lycée Jacques-Decour in Paris and did not go to university. He began working at 18 and took evening classes in chemistry at the Conservatoire national des arts et métiers. He subsequently did his military service.

== Career ==
Maire began his career as a chemist for Pechiney in Aubervilliers near Paris. He quit his job to focus on activism. After he retired from the CFDT, he became the chief executive of Villages Vacances Familles, a chain of affordable holiday villages later known as Belambra Clubs.

== Activism ==
Maire first joined the French Confederation of Christian Workers in 1954. In 1964, he was a co-founder of a secular splinter group, the French Democratic Confederation of Labour. Maire succeeded Eugène Descamps as the secretary general of the CFDT from 1971 to 1988. He took on a more centrist approach, which led more left-wing labour leaders like Jacques Julliard to criticize him. For example, Maire dismissed strike actions as "old labour mythology." Instead, he was a proponent of a more equal division of labour. In 1981, he complained that French public intellectuals were not sufficiently supportive of his efforts. He was succeeded by Jean Kaspar.

Maire joined the Socialist Party in 1974. He was close to Pierre Mendès France, Michel Rocard and Jacques Delors. He was a supporter of the 35-hour workweek passed by the Socialist government under Prime Minister Lionel Jospin in 2000.

== Death and legacy ==
Maire died on 1 October 2017 at the age of 86. One of his sons, Jacques Maire, is a member of the National Assembly for En Marche!

Upon his death, Muriel Pénicaud, the French Minister of Labour, tweeted that Maire "transformed and inspired industrial relations."
