= Monique Mayère =

French artist

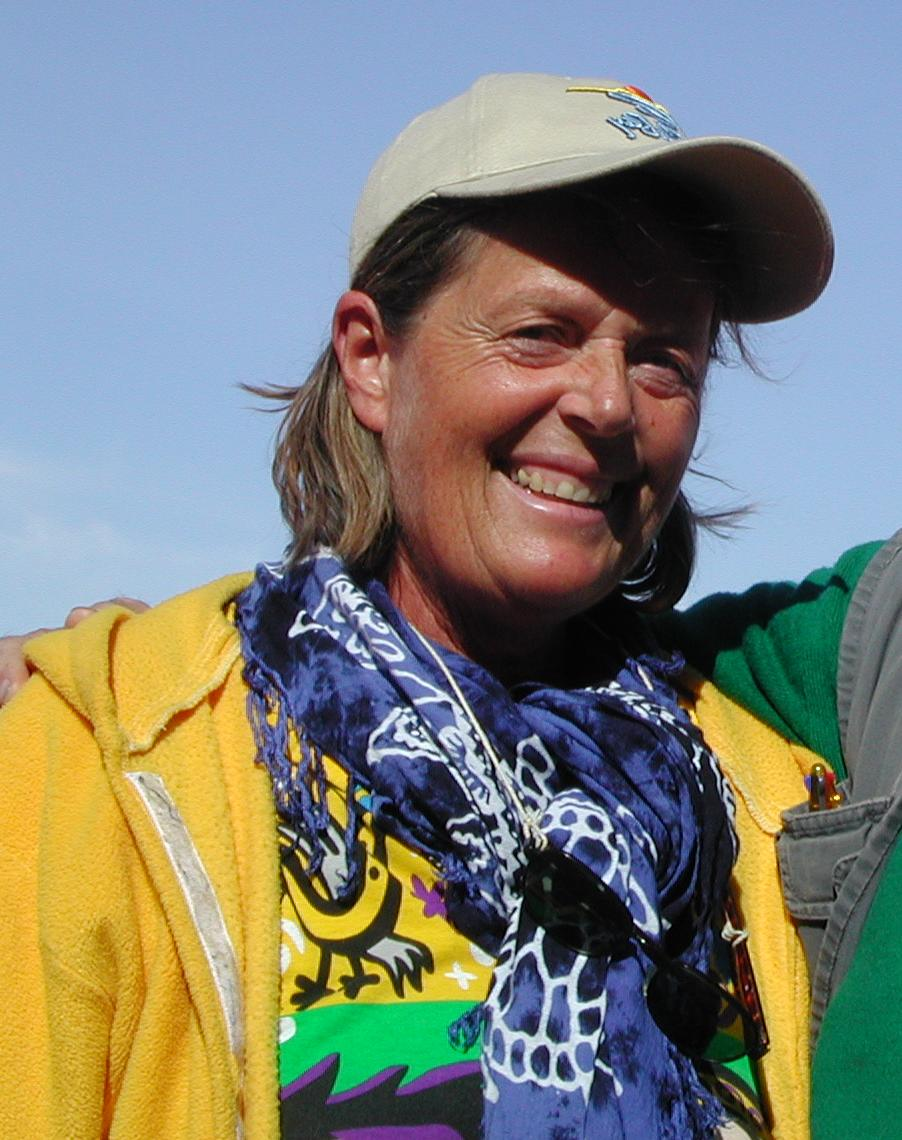
- Monique in 2006
- Born: Monique Mayère; 1944 (age 81–82); Rive-de-Gier, France
- Known for: Sculpture, painting

Monique Uhl (born Monique Mayère; 1944) is a French sculptor and painter.

== Biography ==
Older twin girl of an 8-children family with Henri, Monique was a nurse in the 1960s. She also is a cousin of Philippe Bourguignon and Anne Mayère. As spouse of Jean-Claude Rodet, she had 3 children: Emmanuel (1968), Daniel (1969) and Bruno (1971). Monique co-founded a charismatic community "Le Soly" at Thurins in 1974. Then she worked in an interior architecture company "Cheminée décor" specialized in chimneys at Saint-Cézaire-sur-Siagne.

She got married on 11 April 1987 with Charles Uhl then created her company at Peymeinade and an art gallery named Chantepierre in Nice. She sculpted statues and objects in different matters : woods, stones, plexiglas, resin and metals such as bronze, iron or gold. She also produced woodcut or lithography arts and sculpted on PVC for handicraft printmaking. During the following decade, she travelled sailing in Mediterranean Sea on a boat named Iris, travel writing and painting. In 2007, she was saved from a shipwreck in Eritrea. In 2009, she gave her lithographic printing press to an art school of Grasse. She is militant with Jean-Luc Romero in the French NGO ADMD attached to the World Federation of Right to Die Societies and member of the French Riviera's CSA close to WWOOF.

== Bibliography ==
- Liesse, Editions Gabriel Riqueti, 2018, ISBN 979-10-97458-29-4.
- CATSi et la mer, with Charles Uhl texts, Editions Gabriel Riqueti, 2018, ISBN 979-10-97458-18-8.

== See also ==
- List of sculptors
- Minimalism
