= Jean-Jacques Guillet =

French politician

Mayor of Chaville
- Incumbent
- Assumed office 16 March 2008
- Preceded by: Jean Levain

Member of the National Assembly for Hauts-de-Seine's 8th constituency
- In office 1993–2017
- Preceded by: Claude Labbé
- Succeeded by: Jacques Maire

Personal details
- Born: 16 October 1946 (age 79) Clichy, France
- Party: Independent
- Education: Lycée Condorcet
- Alma mater: University of Paris; Sciences Po

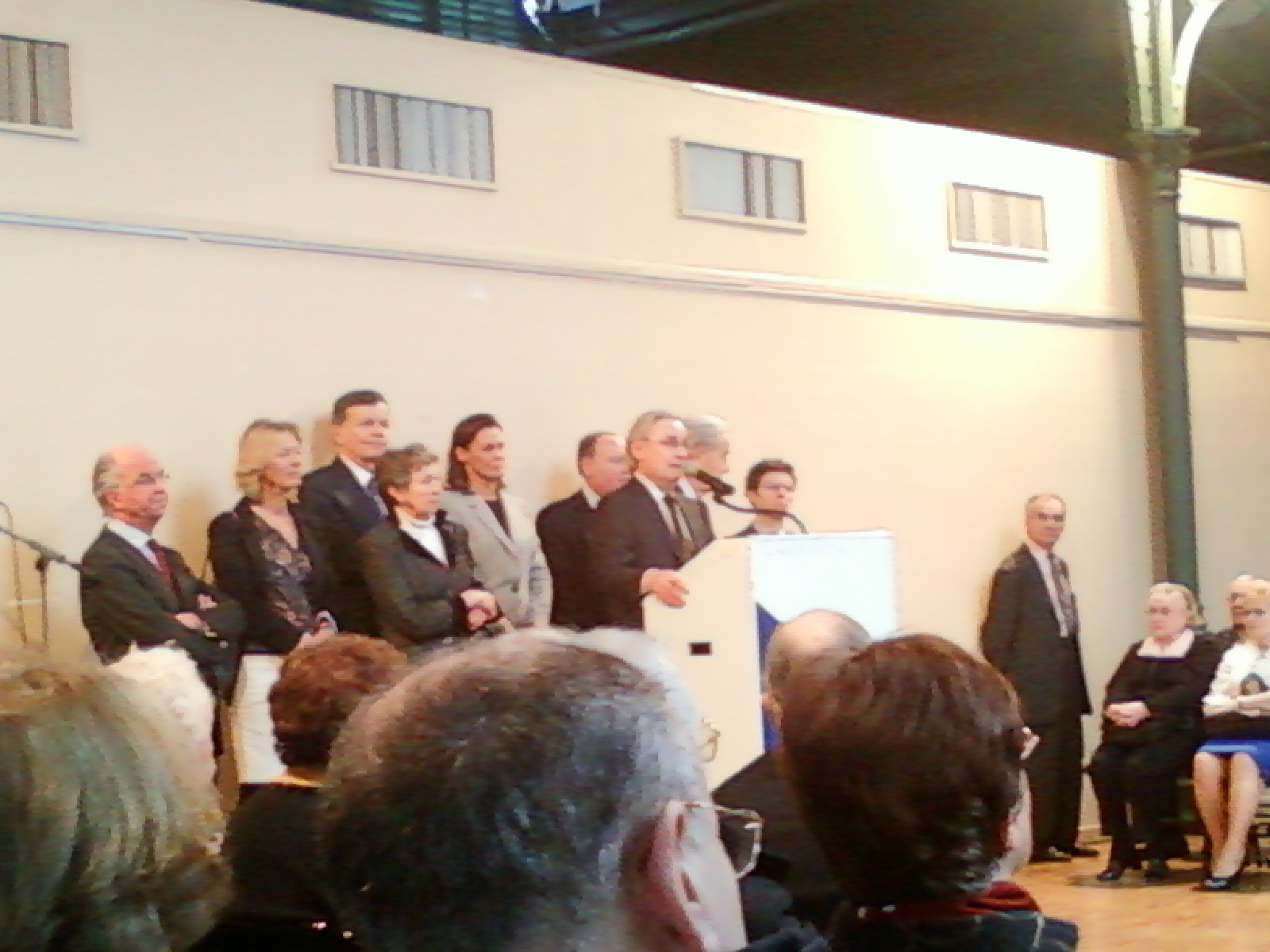
Wishes of MP Jean-Jacques Guillet

Jean-Jacques Guillet (born 16 October 1946) is a French politician. He is mayor of Chaville. He was the deputy for Hauts-de-Seine's 8th constituency in the National Assembly of France from 1993 to 2017, as a member of Rally for the Republic, Rally for France and then The Republicans.

In 2019, he left The Republicans.
