= Hauts-de-Seine's 8th constituency =

Constituency of the National Assembly of France

8th constituency of Hauts-de-Seine
- inline Constituency of the National Assembly of France

- Deputy: Prisca Thévenot; RE
- Department: Hauts-de-Seine
- Cantons: Chaville, Meudon, Sèvres.
- Registered voters: 67,019

The 8th constituency of the Hauts-de-Seine is a French legislative constituency in the Hauts-de-Seine département.

== Description ==
Hauts-de-Seine's 8th constituency lies in the south west of the department and borders Yvelines to the west. The constituency includes the towns of Chaville, Meudon and Sèvres all of which surround the northern edge of the Forest of Meudon.

The seat is traditionally strongly conservative and has elected deputies from the Gaullist right since its creation in 1967.

== Historic Representative ==
Election	Member	Party
1967	Jacques Baumel	UDR
1968		UDR
1969	Jean-Marie Toutain	UDR
1973	Jacques Baumel	UDR
1978	Jacques Baumel	RPR
1981	Jacques Baumel	RPR
1986	Proportional representation – no election by constituency	
1988	Claude Labbé	RPR
1993	Jean-Jacques Guillet	RPR
1997	Jean-Jacques Guillet	RPR
1999	Jean-Jacques Guillet	RPF
2002	Jean-Jacques Guillet	UMP
2007	Jean-Jacques Guillet	UMP
2012	Jean-Jacques Guillet	UMP
2017	Jacques Maire	LREM
2022	Prisca Thévenot	RE

== Election results ==
=== 2024 ===
Candidate	Party	Alliance	First round			Second round		
Candidate	Party	Alliance	Votes	%	+/–	Votes	%	+/–
Prisca Thévenot	RE	ENS	20,274	39.91	-0.21	27,453	62.44	-3.31
Salomé Nicolas-Chavance	PS	NFP	15,392	30.30	+6.05	16,516	37.56	+3.31
Delphine Veissiere	RN		7,979	15.71	+10.34			
Cécile Richez	LR		4,959	9.76	-5.91			
Miron Cusa	DVE		968	1.91	-2.86			
Adélaïde Motte	REC		626	1.23	-4.53			
Adam Brahimi-Semoer	DVE		350	0.69	N/A			
Philippe Hénique	LO		196	0.39	-0.37			
Jean-Baptiste Layly	DIV		49	0.10	N/A			
Valid votes			50,793	98.44	+0.24	43,969	92.51	-1.21
Blank votes			687	1.33	-0.26	3,041	6.40	+0.98
Null votes			117	0.23	+0.02	517	1.09	+0.23
Turnout			51,597	75.65	+17.65	47,527	69.67	+13.80
Abstentions			16,608	24.35	-17.65	20,695	30.33	-13.80
Registered voters			68,205			68,222		
Source: Ministry of the Interior, Le Monde
Result						RE HOLD		

=== 2022 ===
Legislative Election 2022: Hauts-de-Seine's 8th constituency
Party	Candidate	Votes	%	±%
LREM (Ensemble)	Prisca Thévenot	15,547	40.12	-7.91
LFI (NUPÉS)	Annie Larroque Comoy	9,398	24.25	+11.23
LR (UDC)	Cécile Richez	6,073	15.67	−7.18
REC	Chantal Taranne	2,233	5.76	N/A
RN	Sarena Habib	2,082	5.37	+0.79
DVE	Miron Cusa	1,848	4.77	N/A
Others	N/A	1,568		
Turnout		39,458	58.00	−0.44
2nd round result
LREM (Ensemble)	Prisca Thévenot	23,431	65.75	+4.72
LFI (NUPÉS)	Annie Larroque Comoy	12,204	34.25	N/A
Turnout		35,635	55.87	+6.59
LREM hold				

=== 2017 ===
Candidate	Label	First round		Second round	
Candidate	Label	Votes	%	Votes	%
Jacques Maire	REM	19,055	48.03	19,126	61.03
Gilles Boyer	LR	9,066	22.85	12,215	38.97
Nelly Pasquelin	FI	3,156	7.95		
Renaud Dubois	ECO	2,010	5.07		
Marc Thomas	FN	1,818	4.58		
Françoise Roure	PRG	1,300	3.28		
Stéphane de Saint Albin	DVD	787	1.98		
Robin Eppling	DIV	678	1.71		
Romain Chetaille	DVD	641	1.62		
Alexandre Machillot	DIV	356	0.90		
Sandra Merouchi	DIV	273	0.69		
Philippe Hénique	EXG	230	0.58		
Frédéric Schneider	DIV	170	0.43		
Christophe Paillard	DVD	134	0.34		
Votes		39,674	100.00	31,341	100.00
Valid votes		39,674	98.74	31,341	92.50
Blank votes		441	1.10	2,230	6.58
Null votes		65	0.16	312	0.92
Turnout		40,180	58.44	33,883	49.28
Abstentions		28,569	41.56	34,868	50.72
Registered voters		68,749		68,751	

=== 2012 ===
2012 legislative election in Hauts-De-Seine's 8th constituency
Candidate	Party	First round		Second round	
Candidate	Party	Votes	%	Votes	%
Jean-Jacques Guillet	UMP	15,466	37.58%	21,451	54.21%
Catherine Lime-Biffe	PS	13,440	32.65%	18,118	45.79%
Romain Chetaille		2,754	6.69%		
Anne Le Baut	FN	2,740	6.66%		
Catherine Candelier	EELV	1,770	4.30%		
Nadia Mordelet-Carriere	MoDem	1,572	3.82%		
Dominique Rabany	FG	1,432	3.48%		
Michel Becq	DLR	333	0.81%		
Stéphane Castera	PP	312	0.76%		
Emmanuel Sala	PLD	258	0.63%		
Naïma Moghir	AEI	241	0.59%		
Nicolas Tardieu	Cap 21	220	0.53%		
Louise Beniere	CNIP	173	0.42%		
Miguel Segui	NPA	115	0.28%		
Philippe Henique	LO	87	0.21%		
Christophe Paillard	AR	76	0.18%		
Lydia Viera	PFE	71	0.17%		
Jean Grillard	SP	68	0.17%		
Renaud Bouchard		32	0.08%		
Valid votes		41,160	99.00%	39,569	97.39%
Spoilt and null votes		415	1.00%	1,061	2.61%
Votes cast / turnout		41,575	62.04%	40,630	60.61%
Abstentions		25,443	37.96%	26,409	39.39%
Registered voters		67,018	100.00%	67,039	100.00%

=== 2007 ===
Legislative Election 2007: Hauts-de-Seine's 8th constituency
Party	Candidate	Votes	%	±%
UMP	Jean-Jacques Guillet	21,168	50.09	
PRG	Caroline Roy	8,928	21.13	
MoDem	Bernard Lehideux	6,080	14.39	
LV	Luc Blanchard	1,685	3.99	
FN	Annie Dequeant	1,162	2.75	
Others	N/A	3,238		
Turnout		42,845	63.53	
UMP hold				

=== 2002 ===
Legislative Election 2002: Hauts-de-Seine's 8th constituency
Party	Candidate	Votes	%	±%
UMP	Jean-Jacques Guillet	13,554	30.61	
UDF	Herve Marseille*	10,934	24.69	
PRG	Jean-Marie Levain	10,373	23.43	
FN	Marie-Claire De Montalivet	2,813	6.35	
LV	Claudine Cormerais	1,532	3.46	
DIV	Catherine Bitker	969	2.19	
Others	N/A	4,106		
Turnout		44,667	69.38	
2nd round result
UMP	Jean-Jacques Guillet	22,654	59.29	
PRG	Jean-Marie Levain	15,555	40.71	
Turnout		39,945	62.05	
UMP hold				

* Withdrew before the 2nd round

=== 1997 ===
Legislative Election 1997: Hauts-de-Seine's 8th constituency
Party	Candidate	Votes	%	±%
RPR	Jean-Jacques Guillet	16,697	40.25	
PRG	Jean Levain	9,844	23.73	
FN	Sophie Brissaud	5,007	12.07	
PCF	Bernard Jasserand	3,058	7.37	
LV	Anne-Paule Mulleris-Konopnicki	2,432	5.86	
DVD	Silian Journé	1,796	4.33	
GE	Caroline Ballot-Lena	1,340	3.23	
Others	N/A	1,309		
Turnout		43,023	67.29	
2nd round result
RPR	Jean-Jacques Guillet	25,626	59.19	
PRG	Jean Levain	17,669	40.81	
Turnout		45,340	70.92	
RPR hold				

== Sources ==
- Official results of French elections from 1998: "Résultats électoraux officiels en France" (in French). Archived from the original on 20 December 2011.
