= Pierre-Charles Krieg =

French lawyer and politician (1922–1998)

Mayor of the 4th arrondissement of Paris
- In office 13 March 1983 – 14 June 1997
- Succeeded by: Lucien Finel

President of the Regional Council of Île-de-France
- In office 1988–1992
- Preceded by: Michel Giraud
- Succeeded by: Michel Giraud

Member of the first constituency of Paris
- In office 25 November 1962 – 1 April 1986
- Preceded by: Jean Legaret

Personal details
- Born: 18 January 1922 Lille
- Died: 6 June 1998 (aged 76) Paris
- Party: RPR

Pierre-Charles Krieg (born 18 January 1922 in Lille, died 6 June 1998) was a French politician and lawyer.

== Biography ==
As a student, he participated in the parade of 11 November 1940 on the Champs-Élysées, braving the German occupation. He was arrested and deported for entering the Resistance. He escaped in 1943 and joined RPF under Charles de Gaulle in 1947.

After becoming a lawyer, he was also a member of the first constituency of Paris from 1962 to 1986. He was elected chairman of the Law Commission in 1972.

He entered the Council of Paris in 1971 and became the mayor of the 4th arrondissement of Paris between 1983 and 1997.

Member of the Council of Europe as the representative of France from January 1969 to 19 May 1972, then from 2 July 1973 to 30 June 1975, he then sat in the first European Parliament elected by universal suffrage.

He chaired the regional council of Île-de-France between 1988 and 1992.

For health reasons, he resigned from the mayoralty on 4 June 1997, ceding his post to Lucien Finel (UDF).
