= Lucien Finel =

French politician

Mayor of the 4th arrondissement of Paris
- In office 14 June 1997 – 2 April 2001
- Preceded by: Pierre-Charles Krieg
- Succeeded by: Dominique Bertinotti

Personal details
- Born: Lolek Finkelstein; 4 May 1928 Warsaw, Poland
- Died: 24 May 2013 Paris, France
- Party: UDF

Lucien Finel (born Lolek Finkelstein; 4 May 1928 – 24 May 2013) was a resistance fighter and French politician. He was a member of the Union for French Democracy and mayor of the 4th arrondissement of Paris from 1997 to 2001.
