= Philippe Bourguignon =

French businessman

Philippe Bourguignon (born 1948) is a French businessman who served as the chief executive officer of Euro Disney, executive vice president of Disney Europe, the chairman and chief executive of Club Med, and the co-chief executive officer of the Davos-based World Economic Forum in 2003 and 2004. He was also vice chairman of Revolution Places, founded by America Online (AOL) cofounder Steve Case and is the executive co-chairman of Exclusive Resorts until the end of 2024. He is the cofounder with his daughter Emilie of Le Shack, a place for sharing, meeting, working et reconnecting with oneself and others.

== Biography ==
Bourguignon was born in Salins, France. He spent his boyhood in Morocco, then as a teen moved to Aix-en-Provence. He has a master's degree in economics from the Université Paul Cézanne Aix-Marseille III and holds a postgraduate diploma from the Institut d'Administration des Entreprises de Paris (IAE Paris). Bourguignon is married with two children.

== Career ==
Bourguignon spent 14 years with the Accor group from 1974 to 1988, and was eventually promoted to president of Accor for the Asia/Pacific region. During this time he relocated to the US to develop the Sofitel and Novotel brands, and oversaw the construction of Novotel New York, which opened in 1984.

While still in the U.S., Bourguignon was recruited by The Walt Disney Company as the head of real estate development. After joining Disney, he spent two years in California before relocating to Paris in October 1992 to be the CEO of Euro Disney.

In 1997 Bourguignon was appointed chairman and CEO of Club Méditerranée (Club Med), a position he held until 2003. In 2003, Bourguignon became co-CEO of the World Economic Forum (known as Davos), and during 2005 he was the chairman of Aegis Media France. Bourguignon was then vice chairman of Revolution Places, executive co-chairman of Exclusive Resorts until December 2024. He was chairman of the advisory board of Primonial, the largest independent wealth management firm in France between early 2017 and December 2022. He is an active investor in OneRagtime, the venture platform that invests in early stage technology startups and joined the board of Positiv in November 2024, which mission is to promote the economic inclusion of residents of underprivileged neighborhoods.

== Publishing ==
Bourguignon is a co-founder of the Monthly Barometer, a subscription service that enables executives and leaders from around the world to anticipate and leverage emerging trends, using “contextual intelligence” methods to analyze the macro issues relevant to decision-makers.

In 2005, Bourguignon published his first book, Hop! a revealing discussion on the paradoxes of the world and the French economy.

== Boards ==
Bourguignon sat on the boards of CAVA, a fast casual Mediterranean food company founded in Washington, D.C.; Vinfolio, serving wine-enthusiasts and collectors worldwide (USA); Neiman Marcus; busbud; mintHouse; Operation Hope; Positive Planet; Worldview; and is an adviser at startups including SRS Acquiom, and Framebridge. He previously sat on the Boards of Zipcar, a car sharing company (USA) that was acquired by Avis and eBay. He was chairman of the "Scientific Committee of Law and Economics" at the French Ministry of Justice in 2004 and 2005) after being an adviser to the French Minister of foreign affairs in 2003. He was also on the board of Meetic (how Match.com), Canal +, the newspaper Libération, the museum Palais de Tokyo and the Aspen France Institute.

Bourguignon was CEO of Miraval resorts, an exclusive wellness resort. The first Miraval resort covered 400 acres (1.6 km^{2}) at the base of the Catalina Mountains near Tucson, Arizona. In July 2011, Bourguignon was named CEO of Exclusive Resorts. Exclusive Resorts was founded in 2002 and has grown to be the world's largest and best destination club.

Bourguignon has been named Chevalier of the Legion of Honor and Officer in the Ordre national du Mérite in France, and received the Moroccan Wissam Al Alaoui Order.

== Personal ==
Bourguignon is married, and the father of two children. He races yachts with Bruno Peyron and set a record for crossing the English Channel. He also won the Bermuda World Series America’s Cup with Team New Zealand I in May 2016.

== See also ==
- Monique Mayère
