= Guillaume Gouffier-Cha =

French politician

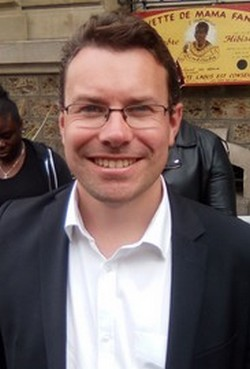
- Guillaume Gouffier-Cha in June 2017

Member of the National Assembly for Val-de-Marne's 6th constituency
- In office 21 June 2017 – 9 June 2024
- Preceded by: Laurence Abeille

Personal details
- Born: 1 February 1986 (age 40) Beauvais, France
- Party: Renaissance
- Education: University of Paris-Est Créteil

Guillaume Gouffier-Cha (born 1 February 1986) is a French politician of La République En Marche! (LREM) who has been serving as a member of the French National Assembly from 2017 to 2024, representing the department of Val-de-Marne.

== Early career ==
In 2016, Gouffier-Cha joined the office of Defence Minister Jean-Yves Le Drian as advisor on relations with Parliament and elected officials.

== Political career ==
Since entering parliament, Gouffier-Cha has been the treasurer of the LREM parliamentary group under the leadership of successive chairmen Richard Ferrand (2017-2018) and Gilles Le Gendre (2018-2020). He also serves as member of the Committee on Legal Affairs. In this capacity, he has been serving as his parliamentary group's co-rapporteur on the government's pension reform plans since 2020, alongside Carole Grandjean, Jacques Maire and Corinne Vignon. Within his parliamentary group, he co-chairs (alongside Bérangère Couillard) a working group on fighting domestic violence.

He was re-elected in the 2022 elections.

In addition to his committee assignments, Gouffier-Cha is part of the French-Egyptian Parliamentary Friendship Group.

== Political positions ==
In July 2019, Gouffier-Cha voted in favor of the French ratification of the European Union’s Comprehensive Economic and Trade Agreement (CETA) with Canada.

== See also ==
- 2017 French legislative election
- 2022 French legislative election
