= 2028 French regional elections =

Election in France

- March 2028

All 17 regional presidencies All 1,757 regional councillors All 169 territorial councillors
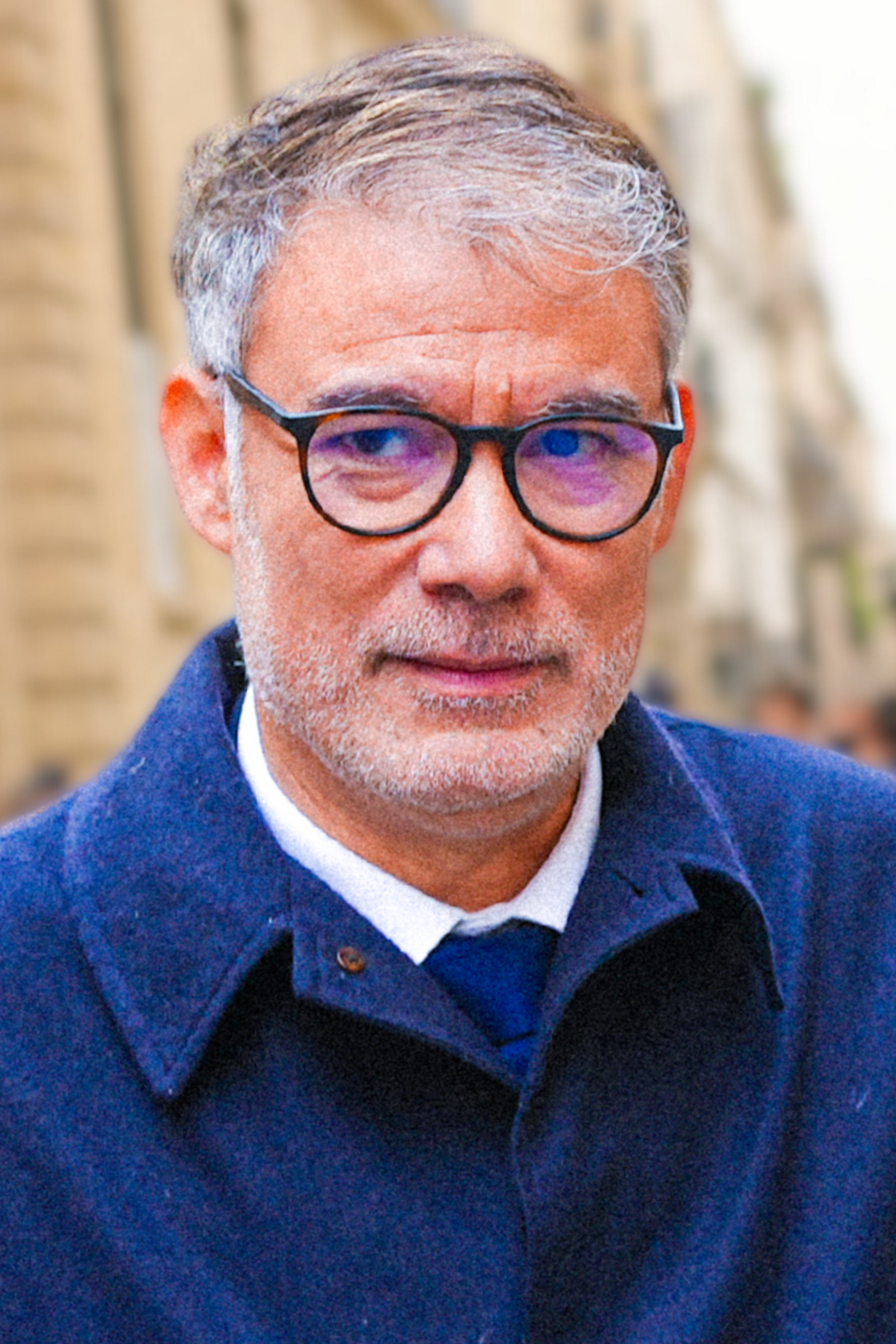

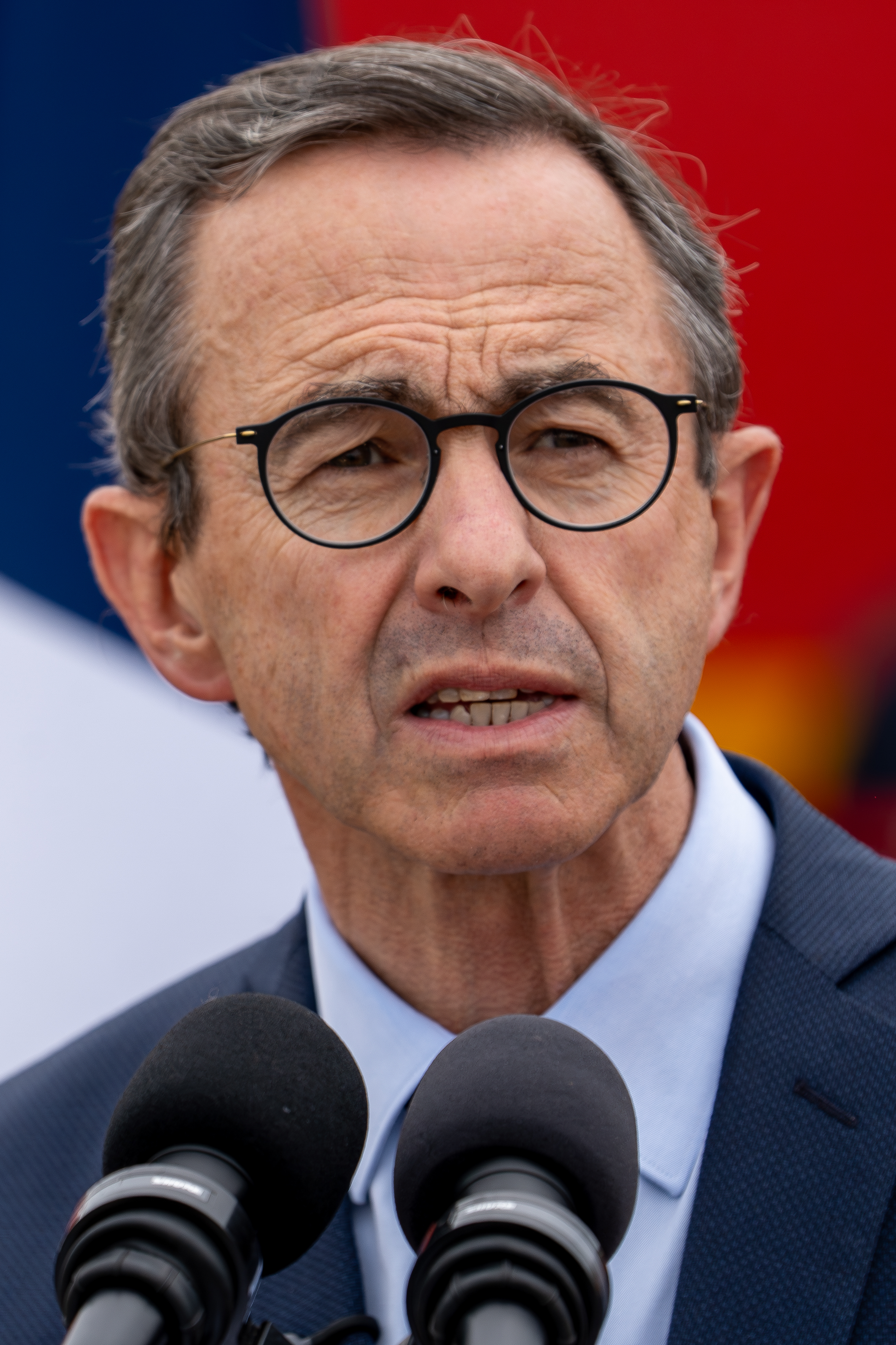

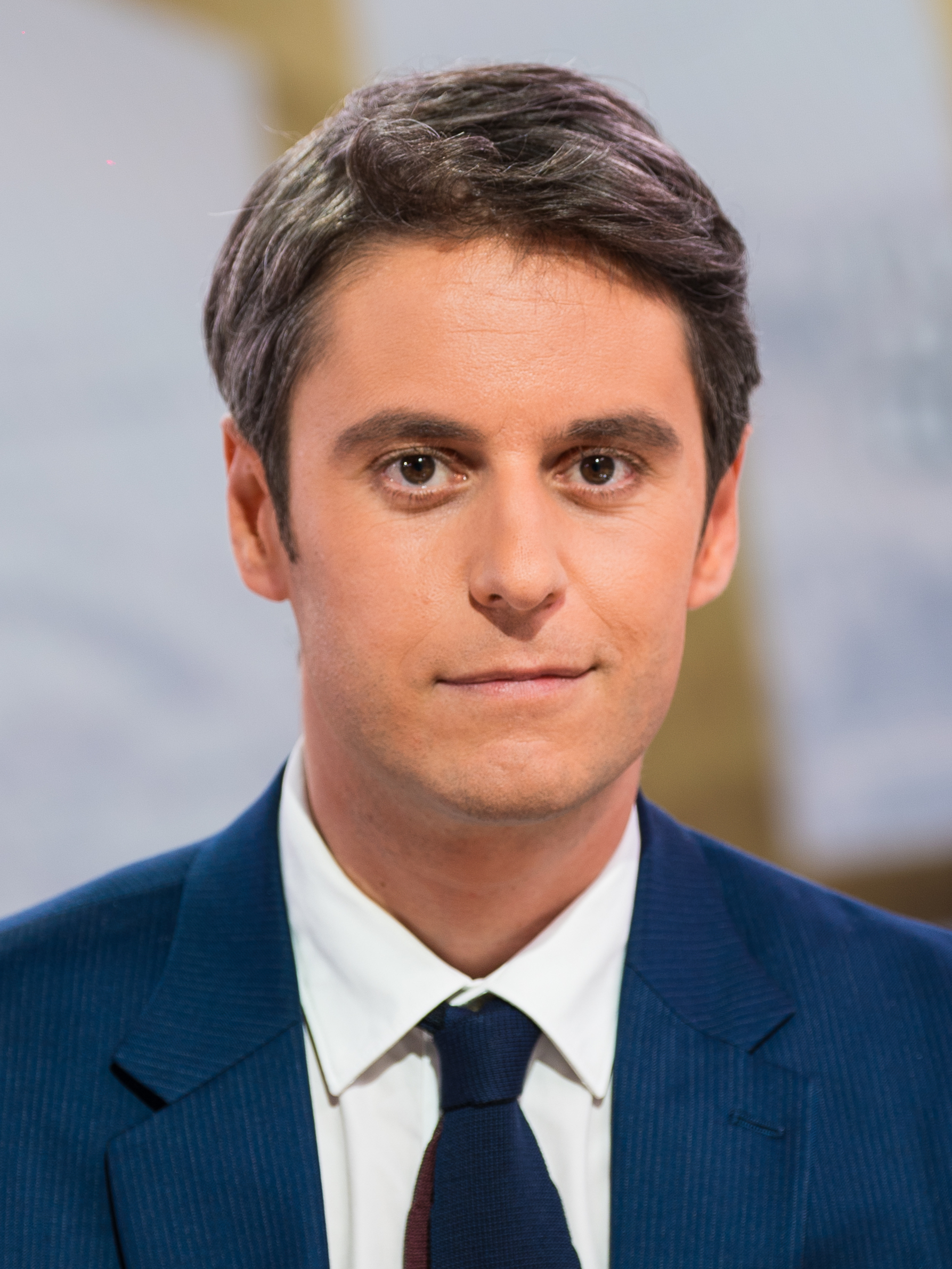
	First party	Second party	Third party
Leader	Olivier Faure	Bruno Retailleau	Gabriel Attal
Party	PS	LR	RE
Alliance	Left	Right	Ensemble
Regions held	5 + 1 (PCR) + 1 (PPM) + 1 (Péyi-G)	4 + 1 (LC) + 1 (SL) + 1 (DVD)	1 (GUSR)
	Fourth party
	REG
Leader	None
Party	Regionalist
Regions held	1 (FC)

The 2028 French regional elections will renew the 1,757 regional councillors and the 169 territorial councillors who make up the 17 regional councils. They are scheduled for March 2028, simultaneously with the departmental elections.

== See also ==
- Elections in France
