= Jean-Paul Huchon =

French politician (1946–2026)

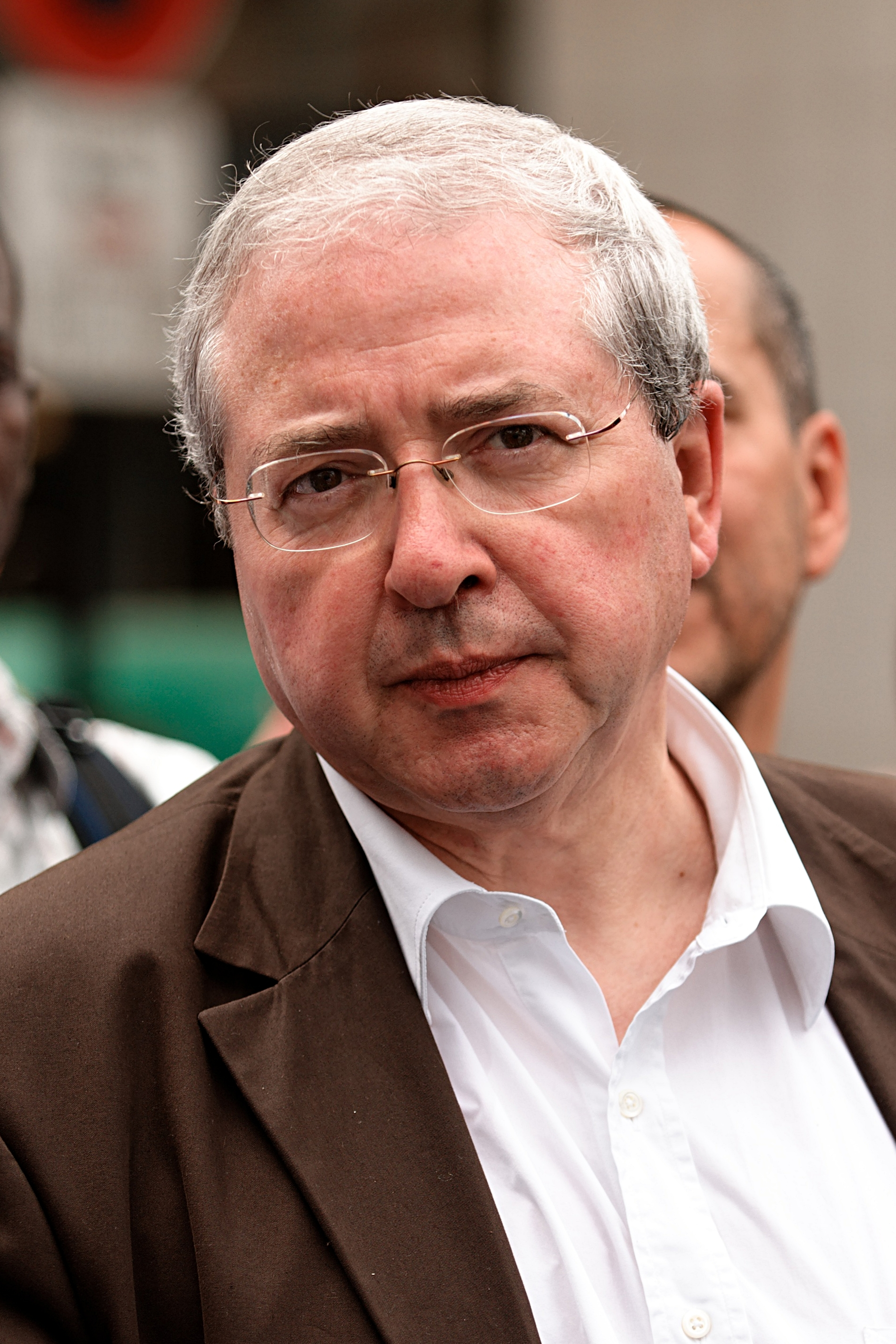
- Huchon in 2008

President of the Regional Council of Île-de-France
- In office 15 March 1998 – 17 December 2015
- Preceded by: Michel Giraud
- Succeeded by: Valérie Pécresse

Mayor of Conflans-Sainte-Honorine
- In office 19 July 1994 – 18 March 2001
- Preceded by: Michel Rocard
- Succeeded by: Philippe Esnol

Personal details
- Born: 29 July 1946 Paris, France
- Died: 23 October 2026 (aged 80) Paris, France
- Party: Socialist Party
- Education: Sciences Po; École nationale d'administration
- Occupation: Civil servant

Jean-Paul Huchon (French pronunciation: [ʒɑ̃ pɔl yʃɔ̃]; 29 July 1946 – 23 October 2026) was a French civil servant and politician of the Socialist Party (PS) who served as Mayor of Conflans-Sainte-Honorine from 1994 to 2001 and President of the Regional Council of Île-de-France from 1998 until 2015.

== Background ==
Huchon graduated from Sciences Po in 1967 and from the École nationale d'administration in 1971. Jean-Claude Trichet was a classmate. His father was a teacher. His first wife was Odile Vadot. Together, they had a son in 1981. Huchon married a second time, to Dominique Le Texier, a civil administrator.

== Early career ==
- 1971 to 1975: civil administrator at the Budget Directorate of the Ministry of Finance
- 1975 to 1978: civil administrator at the International Relations Directorate of the Ministry of Labour and Social Affairs
- 1978 to 1981: head of the Agriculture and European Office at the Budget Directorate of the Ministry of Finance
- 1981 to 1985: Chief of Staff to Michel Rocard (Planning Commission, then Agriculture Ministry)
- 1985 to 1986: general manager of Crédit Agricole
- 1988 to 1991: Chief of Staff to Michel Rocard (Prime Minister of France)
- 1991 to 1998: general manager for François Pinault
- 2006 to 2015: president of the Metropolis organisation

== Political career ==
=== Career in local politics ===
- Mayor of Conflans-Sainte-Honorine: 1994–2001. Elected in 1994, after the resignation of Michel Rocard. Reelected in 1995.
- Deputy Mayor of Conflans-Sainte-Honorine: 1977–1994. Reelected in 1983, 1989.
- Municipal councillor of Conflans-Sainte-Honorine: 1977–2014. Reelected in 1983, 1989, 1995, 2001, 2008
- He tried to be elected in 1997 to legislative elections for the 7th constituencies of Yvelines. He represented the socialist party. He was defeated by Pierre Cardo.

=== President of the Regional Council of Île-de-France, 1998–2015 ===
In 2004, Huchon served as the vice president of the bidding committee for the 2012 Summer Olympics.

Huchon had the longest territorial mandate entire the French Fifth Republic from 1998 to 2015.

In 2007, Huchon was found guilty of illegal taking of interest together with his wife Dominique Le Texier in a case of public contracts awarded in 2002 and 2003. On appeal in 2008 he was found guilty again and sentenced to a suspended prison sentence of 6 months and a €60,000 fine.

He was a keynote speaker at the 2008 Metropolis congress in Sydney, October 2008. He addressed world mayors and industry leaders on issues of eco-regions and governance in the 21st century.

In the Socialist Party's 2011 primaries, Huchon endorsed Martine Aubry as the party's candidate for the 2012 presidential election.

On 11 February 2014, Huchon was among the guests invited to the state dinner hosted by U.S. President Barack Obama in honor of President François Hollande at the White House.

Huchon eventually did not run for reelection in 2015.

== Life after politics ==
Huchon was an adjunct professor at HEC Paris.

Ahead of the 2017 presidential election, Huchon endorsed Emmanuel Macron. In 2018, he was named honorary president of the regional council.

== Death ==
Huchon's death from cancer, aged 80, was announced on 23 October 2026.

== Awards ==
- Légion d'honneur officer
- Ordre national du Mérite
- Mérite Agricole

== Books ==
Jean-Paul Huchon writted several books about the French Left and Michel Rocard :

- 1972: Le Marché Commun
- 1993: Jours tranquilles à Matignon
- 2002: La Montagne aux singes
- 2005: Ceux qui aiment ne peuvent pas perdre

Political offices
Preceded by Michel Rocard	Mayor of Conflans-Sainte-Honorine; 1994–2001	Succeeded by Philippe Esnol
Preceded by Michel Giraud	President of the Regional Council of Île-de-France; 1998–2015	Succeeded by Valérie Pécresse
