= Michel Giraud =

French politician

President of the Regional Council of Île-de-France
- In office 1992–1998
- Preceded by: Pierre-Charles Krieg
- Succeeded by: Jean-Paul Huchon
- In office 1976–1988
- Succeeded by: Pierre-Charles Krieg

Mayor of Le Perreux-sur-Marne
- In office 1971–1992
- Preceded by: Louis Brulas
- Succeeded by: Gilles Carrez

French Minister of Labor
- In office 1993–1995
- President: François Mitterrand
- Prime Minister: Édouard Balladur
- Preceded by: Martine Aubry
- Succeeded by: Jacques Barrot

Personal details
- Born: 14 July 1929 Pontoise, France
- Died: 27 October 2011 (aged 82) Île-de-France, France
- Party: RPR

Michel Giraud (14 July 1929 – 27 October 2011) was a French politician. He was notably Minister of Labor, deputy of Val-de-Marne, President of the Regional council of Île-de-France and president of the Mayors' Association of France. In 2006, he founded the Cœurs en Chœurs association, which enables disabled singers to perform in mixed (handi-handicapped) choirs. He was the organizer of the first concert held at the Palais des Congrès in Paris, live on Direct 8, presented by Philippe Labro.

== Biography ==
A professor of literature, he began his political career as a Gaullist in the late 1960s, becoming a member of the Val-de-Marne departmental council and then mayor of Le Perreux-sur-Marne.

A member of Jacques Chirac RPR party and a staunch supporter of decentralization, he was elected in 1976 as the first president of Île-de-France and is considered the “founding father” of the region. He imposed the term “Francilien,” coined in 1983, and led the region almost uninterruptedly for 22 years.

Finally, he decided not to run for another term in the 1998 regional elections, finding himself at the center of a political and financial scandal involving the funding of high schools in the Île-de-France region, brought to light by Claude-Annick Tissot, head of the tender committee, who was nicknamed the Rally for the Republic clean lady.” On October 26, 2005, after a long trial, he was sentenced to four years' suspended imprisonment and a fine of €80,000 for complicity in corruption involving the RPR, then led by Jacques Chirac. Michel Giraud did not appeal his conviction, unlike most of the other defendants.

He was appointed Minister of Labor in 1993 in Édouard Balladur's coalition government and introduced the five-year law on the annualization of working hours and the use of partial unemployment. He created the first service voucher scheme. He defended the Professional Integration Contract (CIP), which was withdrawn in 1994 under pressure from students who denounced the creation of a “youth minimum wage.”

Having gradually abandoned all political activity, Michel Giraud headed the Fondation de la deuxième chance (Second Chance Foundation) between 1998 and 2011. Recognized as a public utility (Official Journal of February 9, 2006), the foundation was created on the initiative of Vincent Bolloré and is dedicated to helping young people integrate into society.

He is the founder of the Vent d'Est choir, of which he was the amateur choir director in the 1950s. He created a campsite for choir members in Erquy. Vent d'Est still exists today, and many current and former choir members spend their vacations at this campsite.

In 2006, he founded the association Cœurs en Chœurs, which enables singers with disabilities to sing in mixed choirs (disabled and able-bodied). He organized the first concert, which was held at the Convention center in Paris, broadcast live on Direct 8, and presented by Philippe Labro.
