= Jean-Pierre Lecoq =

French politician (born 1954)

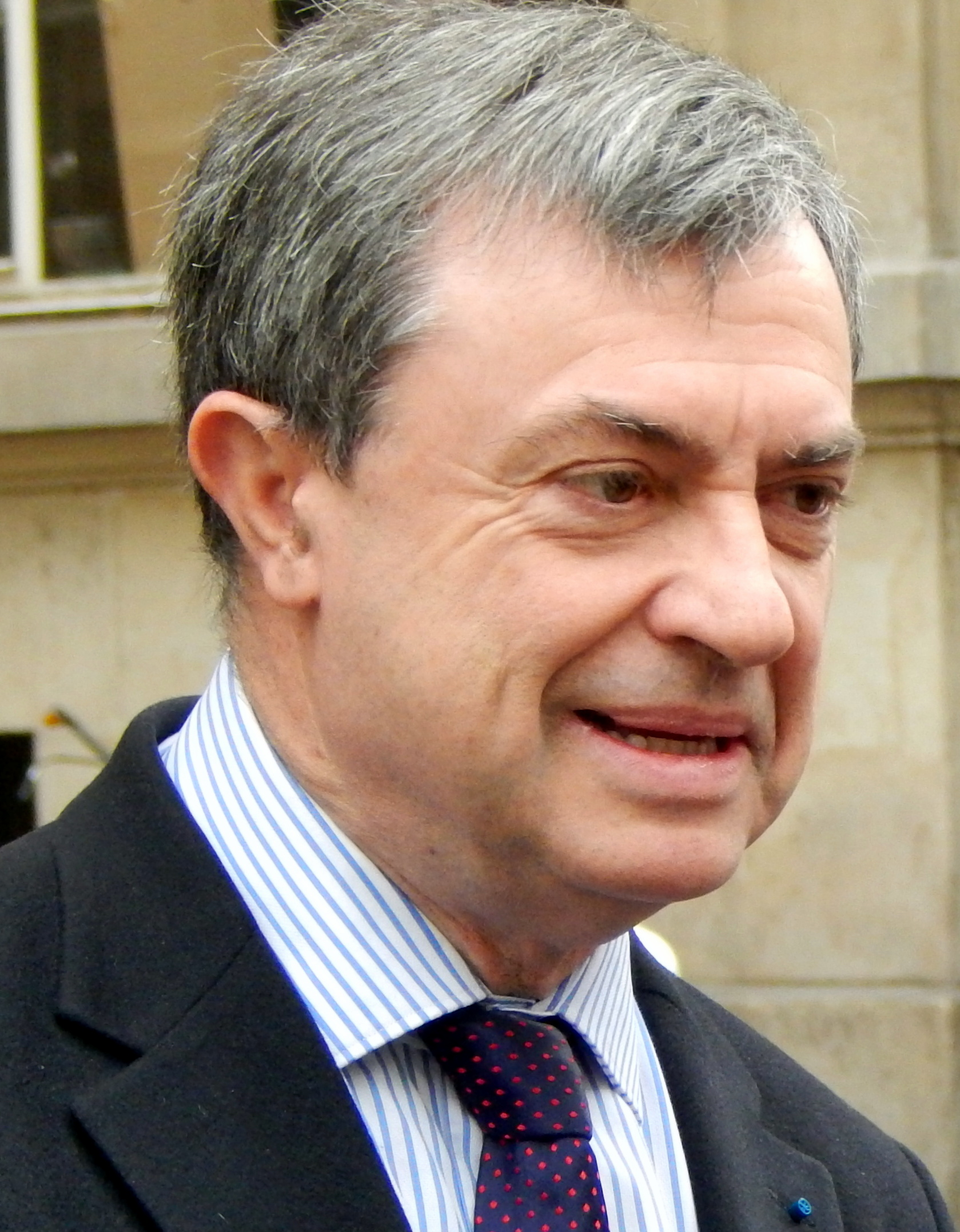
- Lecoq in 2016

Mayor of 6th arrondissement of Paris
- Incumbent
- Assumed office 10 October 1994
- Preceded by: François Collet

Regional Councilor for Île-de-France
- Incumbent
- Assumed office 18 December 2015

Metropolitan Councilor of Grand Paris
- Incumbent
- Assumed office 28 June 2020

Member of the Council of Paris
- Incumbent
- Assumed office 3 January 1993

Personal details
- Born: July 18, 1954 (age 71) Paris, France
- Party: LR (since 2016)

Jean-Pierre Charles Lecoq (French pronunciation: [ʒɑ̃pjɛʁ ləkɔk]; born 18 July 1954) is a French politician who has held the mayorship of the 6th arrondissement of Paris since 1994.

== Early career ==
A former student of Lycée Montaigne, Jean-Pierre Lecoq graduated from ESCP Europe in 1976 and from the Paris Institute of Political Studies in 1978. He pursued a professional career in a major financial group.

== Career in politics ==
A councillor for the 6th arrondissement of Paris since 1983 (initially with the RPR and later with the UMP), he became the deputy to Mayor François Collet. Upon Collet's death in 1994, Lecoq was elected mayor of the 6th arrondissement and re-elected in 1995.

In 2001, after leading a dissident list in the first round against those of Jean-Dominique Giuliani and Claude Roland, representing the lists of Philippe Séguin and Jean Tiberi respectively, his list won the second round with 57.8% of the votes against the socialist Alain Morell, resulting in his re-election as mayor. In 2008, his list won again with 56.04% of the vote against the left-wing union list. During the 2011 senatorial elections, he supported Pierre Charon's dissident list, which resulted in Charon's election as a senator.

From 1997 to 2012, he was the deputy of Martine Aurillac, the MP for Paris's 3rd constituency. In 2012, he ran in the legislative elections for Paris's 11th constituency against socialist mayor of the 14th arrondissement, Pascal Cherki. He came in second in the first round, then garnered 43.5% of the votes in the second round.

On 10 October 2013, Nathalie Kosciusko-Morizet designated him as the UMP leader in the 6th arrondissement for the 2014 municipal elections in Paris. He led a union list of UMP-MoDem-UDI, with Marielle de Sarnez, vice-president of MoDem, in second position. On March 23, 2014, Jean-Pierre Lecoq's list won in the first round, obtaining 52.6% of the votes. He won the three seats on the Council of Paris and 12 of the 13 seats on the arrondissement council.

He supported Nicolas Sarkozy for the 2016 Republican presidential primary. On 3 March 2017, amid the Fillon affair, he withdrew his support for LR candidate François Fillon in the presidential election and endorsed Alain Juppé. Between the two rounds of the 2017 presidential election, he announced his vote for the En Marche candidate.

In the 2017 legislative elections, he ran as a center-right candidate in Paris's 2nd constituency, opposing Nathalie Kosciusko-Morizet. As a result, the LR party initiated suspension proceedings against him. He received 9.2% of the vote in the first round and did not issue a voting directive for the second round.

He was re-elected mayor of the 6th arrondissement of Paris for the fifth time in the 2020 municipal elections, with 52.26% of the vote in the second round.

In late January 2024, Jean-Pierre Lecoq renounced his candidacy to succeed Rachida Dati at the head of the Groupe Changer Paris. His decision meant that Senator Catherine Dumas remained the only candidate in the field to succeed Dati as the head of the opposition group on the Paris Council.

== Honors ==
- Officer of the Legion of Honor
- Officer of the National Order of Merit
- Officer of the Order of Academic Palms
- Officer of the Order of Arts and Letters
