= Val-d'Oise's 7th constituency =

French legislative constituency

7th constituency of Val-d'Oise
- inline Constituency of the National Assembly of France

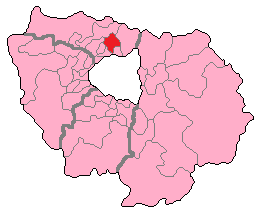
- Val-d'Oise's 7th Constituency shown within Île-de-France
- Deputy: Dominique Da Silva; RE
- Department: Val-d'Oise
- Cantons: Domont - Écouen - Montmorency - Sarcelles-Sud-Ouest
- Registered voters: 67,588

The 7th constituency of Val-d'Oise is a French legislative constituency in the Val-d'Oise département. It is currently represented by Dominique Da Silva of Renaissance (RE).

== Description ==
The 7th constituency of Val-d'Oise lies in the east of the department and includes a portion of Sarcelles and the whole of Montmorency and Domont together they form the northernmost suburbs of the Paris Metropolitan Area.

The seat has historically swung between left and right, however it was held, albeit narrowly, in three successive elections by the UMP from 2002 to 2012, before falling to LREM in 2017.

== Historic Representation ==
Election	Member	Party
1986	Proportional representation – no election by constituency	
1988	Marie-France Lecuir	PS
1993	Raymond Lamontagne	RPR
1997	Yves Cochet	LV
2002	Jérôme Chartier	UMP
2007	Jérôme Chartier	UMP
2012	Jérôme Chartier	UMP
2017	Dominique Da Silva	LREM
2022	Dominique Da Silva	RE

== Election results ==
=== 2024 ===
Candidate	Party	Alliance	First round			Second round		
Candidate	Party	Alliance	Votes	%	+/–	Votes	%	+/–
Romain Eskenazi	PS	NFP	16,797	37.94	+6.35	24,713	60.57	
David Quentin	RN		12,065	27.25	+12.35	16,068	39.43	
Dominique Da Silva	RE	ENS	10,241	23.13	-4.35	WITHDREW		
Jean-Pierre Yalcin	LR		3,891	8.79	+1.11			
Virginie Vieville	REC		696	1.57	-4.71			
Valérie Suarez	LO		578	1.31	+0.29			
Marie-Christine Chastaing	DIV		3	0.01	N/A			
Didier Arnal	DVG		0	0.00	N/A			
Linda Uzan	DVD		0	0.00	N/A			
Aurélien Gavois	NFP		0	0.00	N/A			
Valid votes			44,271	97.78	-0.36	40,801	92.57	
Blank votes			712	1.57	+0.17	2,674	6.07	
Null votes			294	0.65	+0.19	603	1.37	
Turnout			45,277	66.06	+24.12	44,078	64.27	
Abstentions			23,262	33.94	-24.12	24,500	35.73	
Registered voters			68,539			68,578		
Source: Ministry of the Interior, Le Monde
Result						PS GAIN FROM RE		

=== 2022 ===
Legislative Election 2022: Val-d'Oise's 7th constituency
Party	Candidate	Votes	%	±%
PS (NUPÉS)	Romain Eskenazi	9,018	31.59	+5.70
LREM (Ensemble)	Dominique Da Silva	7,846	27.48	-8.50
RN	Bruno Marcel	4,253	14.90	+4.39
LR (UDC)	Andrijana Topuzovic	2,193	7.68	−16.58
REC	Olivier Le Guevel	1,794	6.28	N/A
DVE	François Sacerdot	1,235	4.33	N/A
DVG	Philippe Demaret	790	2.77	N/A
Others	N/A	1,419		
Turnout		29,089	41.94	−1.80
2nd round result
LREM (Ensemble)	Dominique Da Silva	13,936	50.37	-3.51
PS (NUPÉS)	Romain Eskenazi	13,732	49.63	N/A
Turnout		27,668	42.44	+4.86
LREM hold				

=== 2017 ===
Candidate	Label	First round		Second round	
Candidate	Label	Votes	%	Votes	%
Dominique Da Silva	REM	10,776	35.98	12,801	53.88
Jérôme Chartier	LR	7,265	24.26	10,958	46.12
Gilles Monsillon	FI	3,837	12.81		
Bruno Marcel	FN	3,147	10.51		
Rita Maalouf	PS	2,382	7.95		
Célia Jousserand	ECO	1,104	3.69		
Nicole Le Manach	PCF	430	1.44		
Christine Jacquelet	ECO	314	1.05		
Philippe Mounier	DIV	304	1.01		
Gilles Bonhomme	EXG	207	0.69		
Lisa Luchier	DVG	185	0.62		
Votes		29,951	100.00	23,759	100.00
Valid votes		29,951	98.39	23,759	90.85
Blank votes		338	1.11	1,827	6.99
Null votes		151	0.50	567	2.17
Turnout		30,440	43.74	26,153	37.58
Abstentions		39,148	56.26	43,432	62.42
Registered voters		69,588		69,585	
Source: Ministry of the Interior

=== 2012 ===
Legislative Election 2012: Val-d'Oise's 7th constituency
Party	Candidate	Votes	%	±%
PS	Charlotte Brun	14,153	39.35	
UMP	Jérôme Chartier	13,772	38.29	
FN	Denise Aissi	4,143	11.52	
FG	Anne Levaillant	1,768	4.92	
EELV	Hervé Hababou	740	2.06	
Others	N/A	1,393		
Turnout		35,969	53.03	
2nd round result
UMP	Jérôme Chartier	18,176	50.29	
PS	Charlotte Brun	17,967	49.71	
Turnout		36,143	53.21	
UMP hold				

=== 2007 ===
Legislative Election 2007: Val-d'Oise's 7th constituency
Party	Candidate	Votes	%	±%
UMP	Jérôme Chartier	21,905	47.77	
PS	Didier Arnal	11,488	25.05	
MoDem	Martine Cabassut	3,465	7.56	
FN	Lydie Braconnier	2,222	4.85	
LV	Michèle Loup	1,479	3.23	
Far left	Alice Pelletier	1,331	2.90	
PCF	Sandrine Berger	962	2.10	
Others	N/A	3,000		
Turnout		46,456	57.45	
2nd round result
UMP	Jérôme Chartier	24,553	56.78	
PS	Didier Arnal	18,693	43.22	
Turnout		44,284	54.76	
UMP hold				

=== 2002 ===
Legislative Election 2002: Val-d'Oise's 7th constituency
Party	Candidate	Votes	%	±%
UMP	Jérôme Chartier	17,638	38.08	
PS	Didier Arnal	13,021	28.11	
FN	Roger Eliman	5,887	12.71	
UDF	Sylvie Noachovitch	3,367	7.27	
LV	Abdou Vodounnou	1,359	2.93	
PCF	Annick Lassot-Ferrari	1,299	2.80	
Others	N/A	3,744		
Turnout		46,960	64.13	
2nd round result
UMP	Jérôme Chartier	24,363	57.71	
PS	Didier Arnal	17,854	42.29	
Turnout		43,574	59.51	
UMP gain from LV				

=== 1997 ===
Legislative Election 2007: Val-d'Oise's 7th constituency
Party	Candidate	Votes	%	±%
RPR	Raymond Lamontagne	13,044	28.13	
LV	Yves Cochet	12,526	27.01	
FN	Dominique Joly	9,023	19.46	
PCF	Serge Durand	3,582	7.73	
GE	Françoise Paris	1,981	4.27	
DVD	Albert Magarian	1,722	3.71	
LO	François Delobelle	1,574	3.39	
MRC	Michel Lacoux	1,489	3.21	
Others	N/A	1,427		
Turnout		48,199	66.79	
2nd round result
LV	Yves Cochet	22,891	44.68	
RPR	Raymond Lamontagne	21,911	42.76	
FN	Dominique Joly	6,436	12.56	
Turnout		52,533	72.81	
LV gain from RPR				

== Sources ==
Official results of French elections from 2002: "Résultats électoraux officiels en France" (in French).
