= Section des sourds et malentendants socialistes =

French political organization

Section des Sourds et Malentendants Socialistes
- Abbreviation: SSMS
- Formation: June 19, 2010; 16 years ago
- Founder: Raphaël Bouton & Joël Chalude
- Type: NGO
- Legal status: Association
- Purpose: Advocacy, Activism
- Region served: France
- Method: Donations and Grants
- Official language: French
- President: Raphaël Bouton
- Secretary General: Christophe Le Gall
- Main organ: gral. assembly, administrative committee
- Website: www.sourds-socialistes.fr

The Section des Sourds et Malentendants Socialistes : Organization of Socialist Deaf and Hard of Hearing People (SSMS) is a French political organization. This is an organization of French policy of all activists, deaf supporters, all those who want to build a different future at the left. It is an organization of reflection and proposals on socialism, on the issues of deafness and disability.

== Historical ==
A section of the deaf in Paris socialists was existed in 1999 in Paris with the first Secretary of section : Patrick Didden, and Christophe Le Gall, Rachid Mimoun, Daniel Hureau (Founder of the League for the Rights of the Deaf). After reaching 60 members, it has unfortunately disappeared for lack of militants, because of statutory restrictions about geography, imposed by the Socialist Federation of Paris. Antennas have existed in Toulouse, Strasbourg, Lille.

Campaigners deaf socialist meet difficulties of integration in the local sections of the Socialist Party: isolation, difficulty of communication, lack of accessibility of information of their party in despite their high motivation to be full participants, their thirst for recognition, their willingness to go beyond the associative framework, for to all areas. For this, a group of deaf activists was formed November 26, 2006. This group has been active in the presidential campaign and made accessible to the presidential program of Ségolène Royal.

In 2010, the Parti Socialiste and Charlotte Brun, National Secretary are aware of the difficulties deaf activists. A section of Deaf and Hard of Hearing Socialists (SSMS), was created June 19, 2010 by Raphaël Bouton and Joël Chalude sponsored by Charlotte Brun, national secretary in charge of the elderly, disability and dependency.

== Presentation of the SSMS ==
The SSMS is an association law 1901. Although the SSMS is not comply with the statutes of the Parti Socialiste, but it is a thematic local group of the Parti Socialiste.

The association maintains contact with its European counterparts via Deaf European Socialists - Sourds Socialistes Européens (DES-SES).

It also participates in events organized by the parti socialiste at the national level (Congress, Universities) and federal (Fêtes de la Rose, federal commissions). The SSMS has several regional offices in Brest, Dijon, Périgueux, Pau, Strasbourg, Nantes, Valenciennes ...

She translated many documents of the Parti Socialiste in French Sign Language (LSF).

The SSMS militates at the national level and in all departments to enable people with disabilities access to equal rights and the exercise of their citizenship.

Raphaël Bouton is the First Secretary of the SSMS since June 19, 2010. She was unanimously re-elected September 10, 2011.

== Objectives ==
- Fighting for the disappearance of all discrimination based on hearing loss, to claim equal rights for deaf and hard of hearing;
- Allow the emergence of a philosophy and reflection coherent policy on the issue of deafness in socialism;
- Participate fully in the fight for democratic socialism in the country;
- Practice of solidarity among its members;
- Contribute to the development of civic education and fight against injustice;
- Promote accessibility of socialist ideas and debates within the Socialist Party and dissemination;

== Partner organizations in Europe ==
- Skynet.be.
