= Departmental Council of Landes =

Departmental legislature in France

Departmental Council of Landes Conseil départemental des Landes

Leadership
- President: Xavier Fortinon, PS since 21 March 2017

Structure
- Seats: 30
- Political groups: Government (26): PS (19); PCF (4); DVG (2); G.s (1); Opposition (4): DVD (3); MoDem (1); www.landes.fr

The Departmental Council of Landes (French: Conseil Départemental des Landes) is the deliberative assembly of the Landes department in the region of Nouvelle-Aquitaine. It consists of 30 members (general councilors) from 15 cantons and its headquarters are in Mont-de-Marsan.

The president of the general council is Xavier Fortinon.

== See also ==
- Landes (department)
- General councils of France
