= Nicole Catala =

French academic and politician (1936–2022)

Member of the National Assembly for Paris's 11th constituency
- In office 23 June 1988 – 18 June 2002
- Preceded by: None (proportional representation)
- Succeeded by: Yves Cochet

Vice-president of the National Assembly
- In office 10 February 1999 – 18 June 2002
- In office 24 March 1998 – 30 September 1998
- In office 7 April 1993 – 21 April 1997

Councillor of Paris
- In office 24 March 1989 – 21 March 2008
- Mayor: Jacques Chirac; Jean Tiberi; Bertrand Delanoë

Secretary of State in charge of Vocational education
- In office 20 March 1986 – 10 May 1988
- President: François Mitterrand
- Prime Minister: Jacques Chirac
- Preceded by: Roland Carraz
- Succeeded by: Robert Chapuis

Personal details
- Born: 2 February 1936 Millau, France
- Died: 19 October 2022 (aged 86) Paris, France
- Party: RPR
- Spouse: Raymond Franjou
- Children: 1
- Profession: Professor

Nicole Catala (2 February 1936 – 19 October 2022) was a French academic and politician.

== Biography ==
Catala was born in Millau on 2 February 1936 and was the sister of law professor Pierre Catala. An associate professor of private law, she taught in Dakar from 1962 to 1964 before returning to France and teaching in Dijon in 1969.

=== Political career ===
Catala began her political involvement with the Rally for the Republic (RPR). She was a member of the Economic and Social Council from 1979 to 1984. In 1981, she founded the think tank Club 89 alongside Michel Aurillac and Alain Juppé. On 20 March 1986, she was nominated by Prime Minister Jacques Chirac to become Secretary of State for Vocational Training.

In 1988, Catala was elected to the National Assembly to represent Paris's 11th constituency. She was re-elected in 1993 and became Vice-President of the National Assembly alongside Philippe Séguin. She was re-elected once again in 1997 and served as Vice-President of the National Assembly for two more stints.

While serving in the National Assembly, Catala was a member of the Council of Paris, first elected in 1989 and re-elected in 1995 and 2001 on the list of the 14th arrondissement. In 1998, she was elected President of the RPR in Paris.

In 2002, the RPR was dissolved and succeeded by the Union for a Popular Movement (UMP), which chose Dominique Versini as their candidate in that year's legislative election. Catala ran as an independent, but ultimately lost her seat in the National Assembly.

From 2005 to 2008, Catala chaired the Centre d'information et de documentation jeunesse. In 2014, she joined the presidential primary committee of The Republicans for the 2016 primary.

=== Personal life and death ===
On 7 July 1965, Catala married Raymond Franjou, the Socialist Party Mayor of Forcalquier, whom she divorced in 1972 after having a daughter, Marianne, in 1970 with him.

Catala died on 19 October 2022 in Paris at the age of 86.

== Decorations ==
- Officer of the National Order of Merit (2012)
