= Jérôme Chartier =

French politician (born 1966)

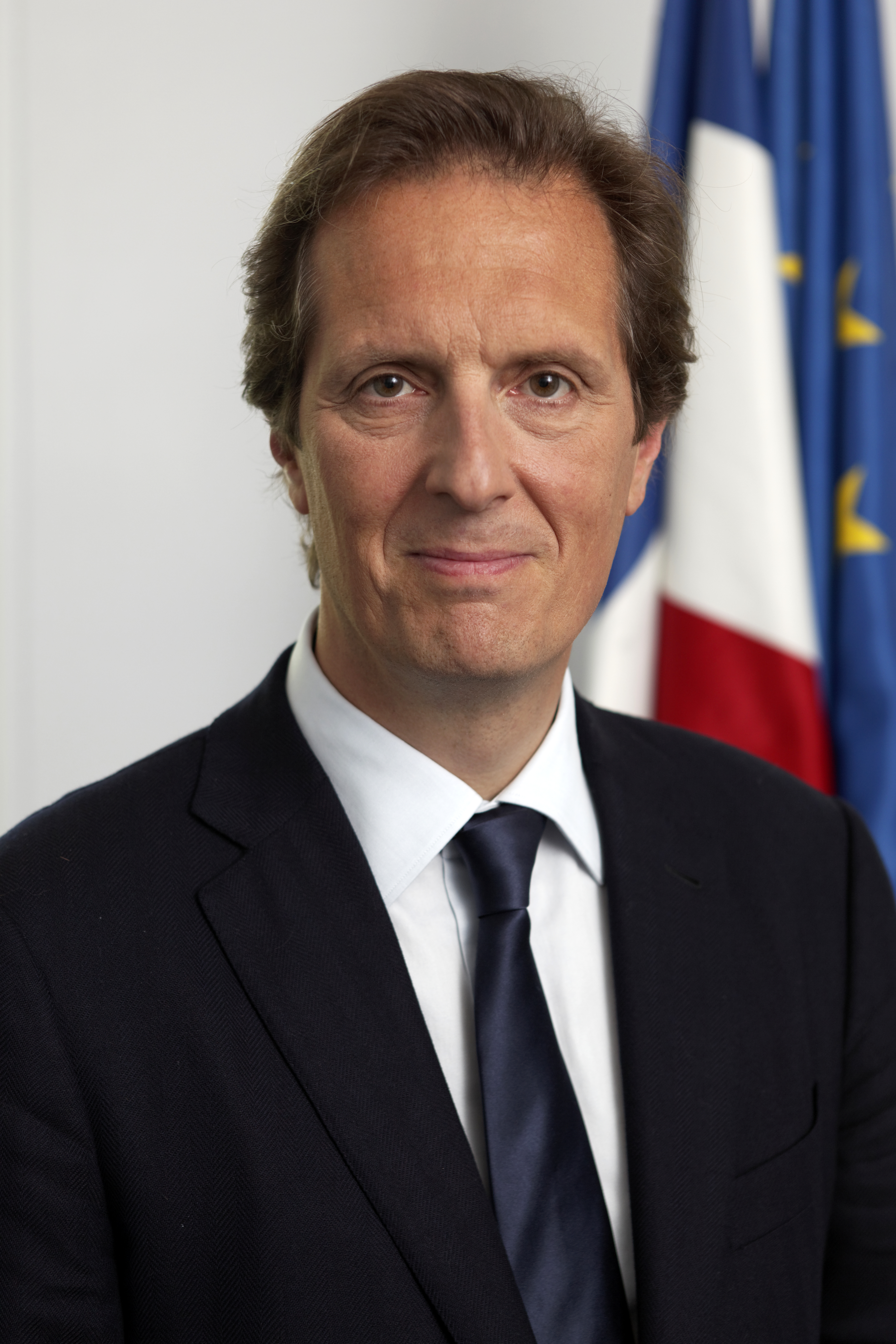

Member of the National Assembly for Val-d'Oise's 7th constituency
- In office 16 June 2002 – 19 June 2017
- Preceded by: Yves Cochet
- Succeeded by: Dominique Da Silva

Mayor of Domont
- In office 25 June 1995 – 4 January 2016
- Preceded by: Marie-France Lecuir
- Succeeded by: Frédéric Bourdin

Personal details
- Born: 14 November 1966 (age 59) Paris, France
- Party: Rally for the Republic (until 2002); Union for a Popular Movement (2002–2015); The Republicans (2015–present)
- Domestic partner: Virginie Calmels
- Education: ESSEC Business School

Jérôme Chartier (born 14 November 1966) is a French politician who represented the 7th constituency of the Val-d'Oise department in the National Assembly from 2002 to 2017. A member of The Republicans and its predecessor parties, he also served as the mayor of Domont from 1995 to 2016, as well as the vice-president of Regional Council of Île-de-France.

== Early life and education ==
Chartier was born into a leftist Catholic family with five children. As a teenager, he joined the Boy Scouts and served as an instructor for the Red Cross Children's Hospital in Margency. He attended Paris Descartes University. He has a double diploma in sociology and linguistics, a bachelor's degree in public administration and a master's degree in political science. Afterwards, he attended ESSEC Business School in 1990 to study urban economics.

== Professional career ==
During his studies he did several student jobs including at Domont Driving school, and freelance contributions to newspapers such as La Gazette du Val-d'Oise or to free radio stations. After that, he became a half-time parliamentary assistant to a Senator, then general secretary of the group of independent senators from 1989 to 1992. In 1993, after his military service, and when he graduated from the ESSEC, he joined a counsel agency as a project manager before becoming a mission manager.

This was for him the opportunity to discover the political marketing techniques of the American campaigns. He was elected as mayor of Domont in1995 and participated in Jacques Chirac's presidential campaign. His election at the age of 28 made him one of the youngest mayors of France. That same year, he was also elected President of the association for the new developments in the area of "l'Ouest de la Plaine de France", before becoming the president of the urban community of "l'Ouest de la Plaine de France" in 2001.

To preserve his professional activity in the private sector, he created his own consultancy office, C and C, in 1997 and worked successively for investment funds, industrial groups and management societies. In 2000, he parted with his office to create a participation holding society with some partners. He sold it in 2002 following his election to the Parliament. He was RPR Secretary for the Val-d'Oise, which is the 10th French federation and was at the same time in charge of the federations. He took an active part in the creation of the UMP and was in charge of the development of the professional federations. He created 21 federations within 6 months, gathering up to 8500 members.

== Political career ==
In 2002, Jérôme Chartier appeared on the national political scene. On 16 June 2002, he was elected deputy of the 7th constituency in Val-d'Oise (townships of Domont, Ecouen, Montmorency, Sarcelles Sud-Ouest) with almost 58% of the votes. He sits in Parliament in the UMP Group. As a member of the Finance Commission, he is in charge of the budgetary follow-up of state fields: he was appointed official recorder of the Home Office funds (2002–2004), of the Foreign Office (2004–2008) and of the mission for Economy. He notably became official recorder for the Finance Commission for 4 laws: concerning the protection of business companies (2003), the opening up of the DCN capital (2004), the purchasing power (2007) and the bank and financial regulation (2010). Being recognized as a specialist of budgetary matters, he became the UMP Group spokesman on the State budget in 2007.

He also got involved in the modernization of French institutions and political life. In 2002 he initiated the creation of a Group of reflection on the modernization of political life and gathered over a hundred members of Parliament of all tendencies. He presided over it until it disappeared in July 2008 after the vote of the constitutional law. On 22 April 2004, the anniversary of the presidential election first ballot, he gave over to the National Assembly President 15 propositions put forward by his group. To continue this reflection, in September 2005, he published Le lifting de Marianne, 50 propositions (l'Archipel), which benefited from a fairly exceptional success for a political book. He suggested propositions for the evolution of the V° republic institutions. Then, in January 2006, he initiated the Convention for the V° Republic, passing references to Arnaud Montebourg's Convention for the VI° Republic. His propositions were positively greeted notably by Nicolas Sarkozy during his 2007 presidential campaign.

He was reelected deputy of Val-d'Oise on 17 June 2007 with nearly 57% of the votes (48% on the first ballot). His commitment to the constitutional debate had been such that, in 2008, he was appointed spokesman of the UMP group for the discussion of the law reforming the constitution of the V° Republic which was voted by the Congress in July 2008. Within the UMP group, he furthered a certain number of propositions and ideas of reforms in economical and social areas: in 2007 he was, notably, the author of a report on social VAT which would be at the origin of the "purchasing power VAT" concept. He then became in charge, within the presidential party, of the debate on purchasing power. In January 2008, he was appointed National Secretary of the UMP, in charge of the reforms follow up, then in September 2008, national spokesman on the reforms for the UMP group. In March 2009, Xavier Bertrand, National Secretary appointed him as National Secretary in charge of the public finances and the tax system. As a candidate for his own reelection in June 2012, he resisted the "Pink Wave" and obtained 38.29% of the votes on the first ballot vs 39.35 for his socialist adversary, and finally won with 50.29% in the second ballot. He supported François Fillon's application to the presidency of the UMP group during the 2012 autumn. He became his spokesman and a member of his closest staff. In January 2013, after the agreement between François Fillon and Jean François Copé he was appointed general manager of the animation of the group altogether with Philippe Cochet. In March 2014 he was re-elected mayor of Domont with 78.9% of the votes.

== Intellectual career ==
He revived the liberal political forum Les Entretiens de Royaumont in 2003, which was originally created in 1947 by Henry Goüin. In 2013, Les Entretiens celebrated its 10th anniversary and, nowadays, has become one of the major political think tanks in France. Starting in 2014, Les Entretiens went international, holding talks in Madrid in June, Casablanca in October, and Warsaw in November.
