= Guillaume Balas =

French politician (born 1972)

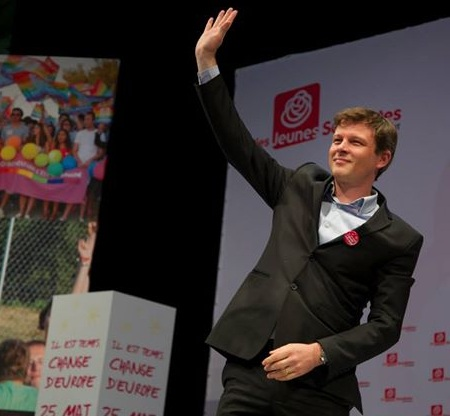
- Balas in 2014

Member of the European Parliament
- In office 1 July 2014 – 1 July 2019
- Constituency: Île-de-France

Personal details
- Born: 30 August 1972 (age 53)
- Party: Génération.s (since 2017)
- Other party: Socialist Party (until 2017)

Guillaume Balas (born 30 August 1972) is a French politician. From 2014 to 2019, he was a member of the European Parliament. From 2017 to 2020, he served as coordinator of Génération.s.

== Biography ==
The son of an engineer, he worked as a history and geography teacher until his election to the European Parliament.

Guillaume Balas joined the Socialist Party in 1991.He was also an activist with the UNEF-ID, serving as its vice president from 1994 to 1995.

From 2012 to 2015, he served as secretary-general and spokesperson for the “A World Ahead” faction within the Socialist Party (France), which was part of the party’s “left wing.” In January 2015, he participated in a rally in support of SYRIZA shortly before the elections that led to Alexis Tsipras becoming Prime Minister of Greece.Similarly, in December 2015, he expressed his opposition to the constitutional amendment aimed at extending the revocation of French citizenship to French citizens born in France.

In 2015, he joined the list of the first signatories of the “À gauche pour gagner” (or Motion B) faction, which garnered 29% of the vote at the Socialist Party’s Poitiers Congress. He led this faction—positioned on the left wing of the Socialist Party—alongside Christian Paul, Laurent Baumel, and Emmanuel Maurel.

As chair of the Socialist Group in the Île-de-France Regional Council from 2010 to 2014, he was nominated as the second candidate on the PS-PRG list in the Île-de-France constituency for the European elections. Since the list secured three seats on May 25, 2014, he was elected to the European Parliament. In the European Parliament, he is a full member of the Committee on Employment and Social Affairs and an alternate member of the Committee on the Environment, Public Health, and Food Safety. In 2015, he was tasked by the Parliament with preparing a report on social dumping in Europe. In 2016, he launched the informal European exchange platform “Progressive Caucus” alongside Eva Joly and other Members of the European Parliament to “open the doors to the left”.

He therefore does not hesitate to question the value of the European left’s participation in the grand coalition supporting the Juncker Commission, which he accuses of prioritizing the internal market at the expense of social issues.

An advocate for unity on the left, he calls for the rallying of “all those who want to reclaim democratic sovereignty in the face of the forces of dissolution driven by ultra-capitalism”.

He is the project coordinator for Benoît Hamon, the Socialist Party candidate in the 2017 presidential election. On November 14, 2017, he left the Socialist Party and joined Génération.s.

He ran for a second term as a Member of the European Parliament in the May 26, 2019, elections on the list headed by Benoît Hamon. The list received 3.27% of the vote but won no seats.
