= Virginie Calmels =

French businesswoman and politician

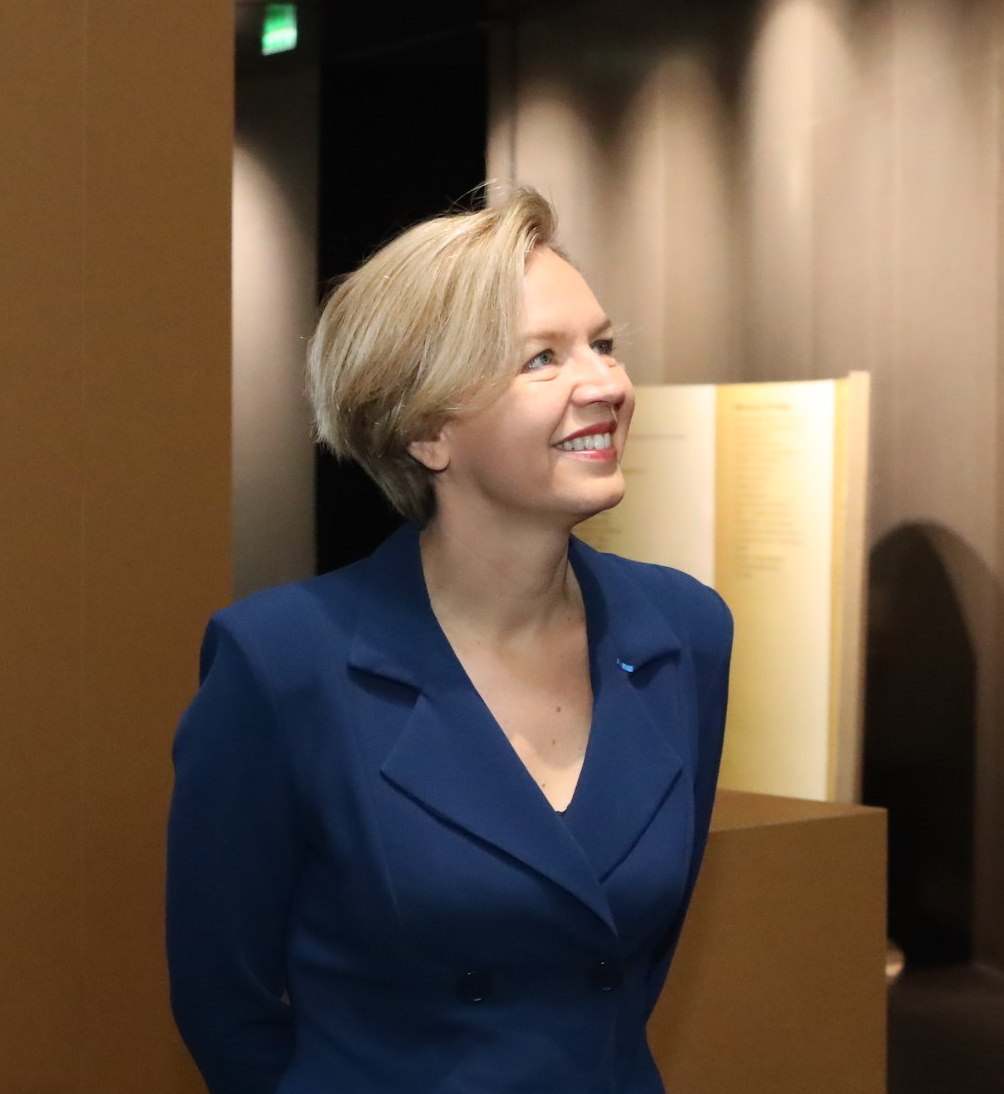
- Virginie Calmels in 2016

Member of the Regional Council of Nouvelle-Aquitaine
- In office 4 January 2016 – 30 September 2020
- President: Alain Rousset

Deputy Mayor of Bordeaux
- In office 23 March 2014 – 14 February 2019
- Mayor: Alain Juppé

Vice-President of The Republicans
- In office 13 December 2017 – 17 June 2018
- President: Laurent Wauquiez
- Preceded by: Laurent Wauquiez
- Succeeded by: Jean Leonetti

Personal details
- Born: 11 February 1971 (age 55) Talence, France
- Party: The Republicans
- Spouse: Jérôme Chartier (m. 2017; div. 2021)
- Education: Lycée Marceau
- Alma mater: Toulouse Business School; INSEAD

Virginie Calmels (born 11 February 1971) is a French businesswoman and politician. She is the former chief executive officer (CEO) of Canal+ and Endemol. She was Alain Juppé’s deputy mayor in Bordeaux. She is also the regional councillor of Nouvelle-Aquitaine.

== Education ==
Calmels holds a diploma in accounting and auditing from the École supérieure de commerce (ESC) in Toulouse in 1993. She also studied the Advanced Management Program (AMP) at INSEAD.

== Career ==
Calmels started her career in 1993 as the financial auditor for Salustro Reydel. In 2000, she joined Canal+ as its finance director and was later promoted as its CEO. She left Canal+ in 2002.

In 2003, Calmels was at first appointed as general director of Endemol France and later became its president in 2007. In 2012, Virginie Calmels was promoted to the role of COO of Endemol world while remaining CEO of Endemol France’s unit. She left the Endemol Group in 2013.

In January 2013, Calmels replaced Mr. Antoine Jeancourt-Galignani as chairman of Euro Disney S.C.A.

In March 2016, she was appointed as a member of Assystem’s board of directors.
