= Paris's 11th constituency =

Constituency of the National Assembly of France

11th constituency of Paris
- inline Constituency of the National Assembly of France

- Paris, showing its post 2012 legislative constituencies
- Deputy: Céline Hervieu; PS
- Department: Paris
- Registered voters: 70,944

The 11th constituency of Paris (French: Onzième circonscription de Paris) is a French legislative constituency in the Paris department (75). Like all other 576 French constituencies, it elects one deputy to the National Assembly using the two-round system.

The constituency covers parts of the 6th and 14th arrondissements on Paris's Rive Gauche. Its boundaries were heavily redrawn in 1988 and 2012.

Since 2024, its deputy has been Céline Hervieu of the Socialist Party (PS).

11th constituency of Paris
- inline Constituency of the National Assembly of France

- Paris, showing its legislative constituencies between 1988 and 2012
- Member: constituency abolished, 2012
- Department: Paris

Map of Paris constituencies in 1981.

== Historic representation ==
Election	Member	Party	Source
1958	Raphaël Touret	UNR	
1962	Roger Frey	UNR	
1963	Raphaël Touret	UNR	
1965	Roger Frey	UNR	
1965	Jean-Claude Servan-Schreiber	UNR	
1967	Roger Frey	UDR	
1967	Aimée Batier	UDR	
1968	Roger Frey	UDR	
1968	Charles Magaud	UDR	
1973	Roger Frey	UDR	
1974	Charles Magaud	UDR	
1978	Paul Pernin	UDF	
1981	Paul Pernin	UDF	
1986	Proportional representation - no election by constituency		
1988	Nicole Catala	RPR	
1993	Nicole Catala	RPR	
1997	Nicole Catala	RPR	
2002	Yves Cochet	LV	
2007	Yves Cochet	LV	
2012	Pascal Cherki	PS	
2017	Marielle de Sarnez	MoDem	
2021	Maud Gatel	MoDem	
2022	Maud Gatel	MoDem	
2024	Céline Hervieu	PS	

== Election results ==
=== 2024 ===
Candidate	Party	Alliance	First round			Second round		
Candidate	Party	Alliance	Votes	%	+/–	Votes	%	+/–
Céline Hervieu	PS	NFP	24,195	43.70	+6.13	25,213	50.58	+6.03
Maud Gatel	MoDem	ENS	19,295	34.85	-2.45	24,631	49.42	-6.03
Lindsay Fischer	RN		5,632	10.17	+6.66			
Jean-François Alexandre	LR		3,888	7.02	-5.18			
Anne-Marie Taranne	REC		749	1.35	-3.85			
Julie Lasne	DVE		715	1.29	N/A			
Julien Vick	DVE		387	0.70	N/A			
Marie Camp	DIV		259	0.47	N/A			
Laurent Vinciguerra	LO		223	0.40	-0.45			
Iwan Clemente	DIV		25	0.05	N/A			
Rose Lavire	EXG		0	0.00	N/A			
Valid votes			55,368	98.90	+0.29	49,844	96.17	+0.01
Blank votes			451	0.81	-0.26	1,460	2.82	-0.03
Null votes			162	0.29	-0.03	527	1.02	+0.02
Turnout			55,981	76.82	+16.69	51,831	71.13	+11.04
Abstentions			16,891	23.18	-16.69	21,041	28.87	-11.04
Registered voters			72,872			72,872		
Source: Ministry of the Interior, Le Monde
Result						PS gain from MoDem		

=== 2022 ===
2022 legislative election: Paris's 11th constituency
Party	Candidate	Votes	%	±%
PS (NUPÉS)	Olivia Polski	16,275	37.57	+5.02
MoDem (Ensemble)	Maud Gatel	16,153	37.30	-5.09
LR (UDC)	Marie-Claire Carrère-Gée	5,283	12.20	−0.11
REC	Franck Layre-Cassou	2,252	5.20	N/A
RN	Saddia Cousin	1,520	3.51	−0.94
Others	N/A	1,829		
Turnout		43,926	60.13	−2.20
2nd round result
MoDem (Ensemble)	Maud Gatel	23,407	55.45	-8.05
PS (NUPÉS)	Olivia Polski	18,805	44.55	N/A
Turnout		42,212	60.09	+10.27
MoDem hold				

=== 2017 ===
2017 legislative election: Paris's 11th constituency
Party	Candidate	Votes	%	±%
MoDem	Marielle de Sarnez	17,733	40.58	+36.92
LR	Francis Szpiner	7,316	16.74	−16.69
PS	Pascal Cherki	6,599	15.10	−25.01
LFI	Jean-Pierre Coulomb	3,430	7.85	N/A
EELV	Florentin Letissier	2,643	6.05	+0.27
DIV	Armelle Malvoisin	1,465	3.35	N/A
FN	Elisabeth Baston	1,064	2.43	−2.04
Others	N/A	3,449		
Turnout		44,222	62.33	−1.21
2nd round result
MoDem	Marielle de Sarnez	19,203	63.50	N/A
LR	Francis Szpiner	11,036	36.50	−7.03
Turnout		35,344	49.82	−11.07
MoDem gain from PS		Swing		

=== 2012 ===
2012 legislative election: Paris's 11th constituency
Party	Candidate	Votes	%	±%
PS	Pascal Cherki	17,722	40.11	N/A
UMP	Jean-Pierre Lecoq	14,770	33.43	−0.60
FG	Dominique Nogueres	2,685	6.08	+3.51
EELV	Célia Blauel	2,554	5.78	−30.01
FN	Claire Coutau-Begarie	1,976	4.47	+1.93
MoDem	Jean-François Martins	1,619	3.66	−14.71
Others	N/A	2,855		
Turnout		44,181	63.54	−1.86
2nd round result
PS	Pascal Cherki	23,901	56.47	N/A
UMP	Jean-Pierre Lecoq	18,421	43.53	+0.70
Turnout		42,322	60.89	−2.29
PS gain from EELV				

=== 2007 ===
Map of Paris's 21 legislative constituencies, 1988–2007 elections

Elections between 1988 and 2007 were based on the 1988 boundaries.

2007 legislative election: Paris's 11th constituency
Party	Candidate	Votes	%	±%
LV	Yves Cochet	13,927	35.79	
UMP	Nicole Guedj	13,244	34.03	
MoDem	Marielle de Sarnez	7,148	18.37	
Far left	Leila Soula	1,019	2.62	
PCF	Ian Brossat	1,002	2.57	
FN	Jacques Souchet	987	2.54	
Others	N/A	1,591		
Turnout		39,235	65.40	
2nd round result
LV	Yves Cochet	21,210	57.17	
UMP	Nicole Guedj	15,891	42.83	
Turnout		37,896	63.18	
LV hold				

=== 2002 ===
2002 legislative election: Paris's 11th constituency
Party	Candidate	Votes	%	±%
LV	Yves Cochet	14,453	38.07	
UMP	Dominique Versini	9,469	24.94	
DVD	Nicole Catala	5,206	13.71	
FN	Yves de Coatgoureden	2,359	6.21	
UDF	Yves Oge	1,840	4.85	
PCF	Jean Calvary	1,006	2.65	
Others	N/A	3,632		
Turnout		38,359	71.30	
2nd round result
LV	Yves Cochet	18,666	51.83	
UMP	Dominique Versini	17,345	48.17	
Turnout		36,780	68.38	
LV gain from UMP				

=== 1997 ===
1997 legislative election: Paris's 11th constituency
Party	Candidate	Votes	%	±%
RPR	Nicole Catala	11,874	34.25	
PS	Pierre Castagnou	9,842	28.39	
FN	Bertrand Robert	3,763	10.85	
PCF	Maurice Lassalle	2,303	6.64	
LV	Claire le Strat	1,828	5.27	
LO	Patrick Marcireau	896	2.58	
DVD	Olivier Maurice	764	2.20	
Others	N/A	2,403		
Turnout		35,652	64.68	
2nd round result
RPR	Nicole Catala	18,553	50.43	
PS	Pierre Castagnou	18,235	49.57	
Turnout		38,252	69.44	
RPR hold				
