= Laura Slimani =

French politician (born 1989)

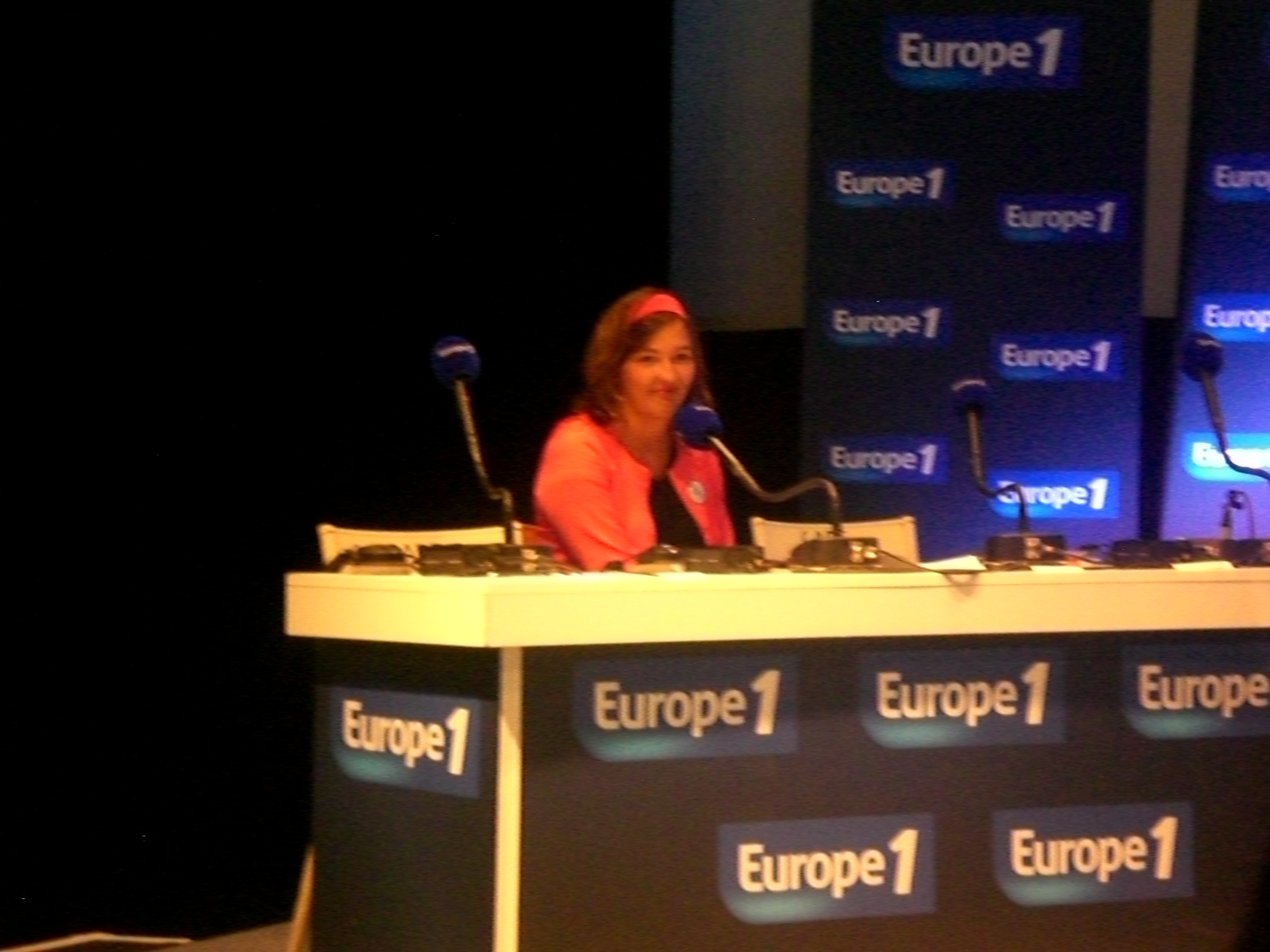
- Slimani in 2014

Deputy Mayor of Rouen
- Incumbent
- Assumed office 3 July 2020
- Mayor: Nicolas Mayer-Rossignol

President of Young European Socialists
- In office 11 April 2015 – 7 April 2017
- Preceded by: Kaisa Vatanen
- Succeeded by: João Albuquerque

Leader of the Young Socialist Movement
- In office 17 November 2013 – 19 December 2015
- Preceded by: Thierry Marchal-Beck
- Succeeded by: Benjamin Lucas

Personal details
- Born: 23 August 1989 (age 37) Rouen, France
- Party: The Ecologists (since 2022); Génération.s (2017–2022); Socialist Party (2010–2017)
- Education: Institut d'études politiques de Bordeaux; Cardiff University

Laura Slimani (born 23 August 1989) is a French politician of The Ecologists. Since 2020, she has served as a deputy mayor of Rouen. From 2013 to 2015, she was the leader of the Young Socialist Movement. From 2015 to 2017, she served as president of Young European Socialists. In the 2019 European Parliament election, she was a candidate for member of the European Parliament.

Slimani joined the Socialist Party in 2010. During the 2017 Socialist Party presidential primary, she served as spokesperson for Benoît Hamon. In September 2017, she left the Socialist Party and joined Hamon's newly founded Génération.s. In the 2020 municipal elections, she ran alongside The Ecologists. During the 2021 Green Party presidential primary, she supported Éric Piolle.
