= Compans-Caffarelli =

Business district in Toulouse, France

Coordinates: 43.6108819°N 1.4358405°E

Location of Compans-Caffarelli in Haute-Garonne

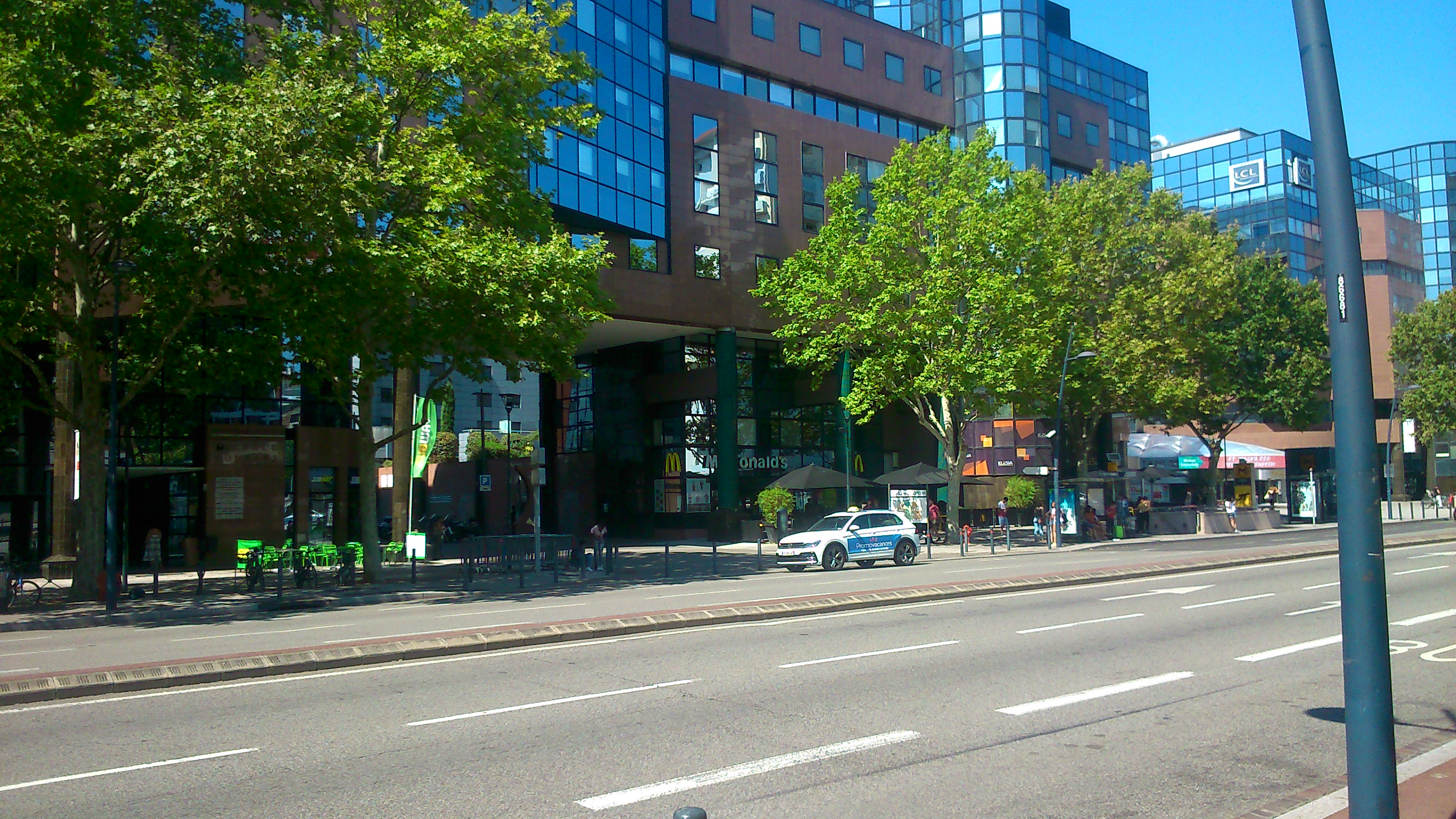
Boulevard Lascrosses

Compans-Caffarelli is a business district in Toulouse in Haute-Garonne, France, where companies and grandes écoles are located.

It is located close to the Canal du Midi.

== Name ==
The name is from the French Divisional General Jean Dominique Compans and the French général de division of Italian descent Marie-François Auguste de Caffarelli du Falga.

== Geography ==
The district is between the Canal de Brienne (south) and the Canal du Midi (north).

== Buildings and Monuments ==
Compans-Caffarelli welcomes hotels, companies (such as EDF, Orange Business Services), sports and commercial areas, as well as the Toulouse 1 University Capitole, Toulouse Business School, a campus of Epitech (IT college), a campus of IPSA (aerospace college), a campus of ISEG (communication school) etc.
