= Dominique Da Silva (politician) =

French politician (born 1968)

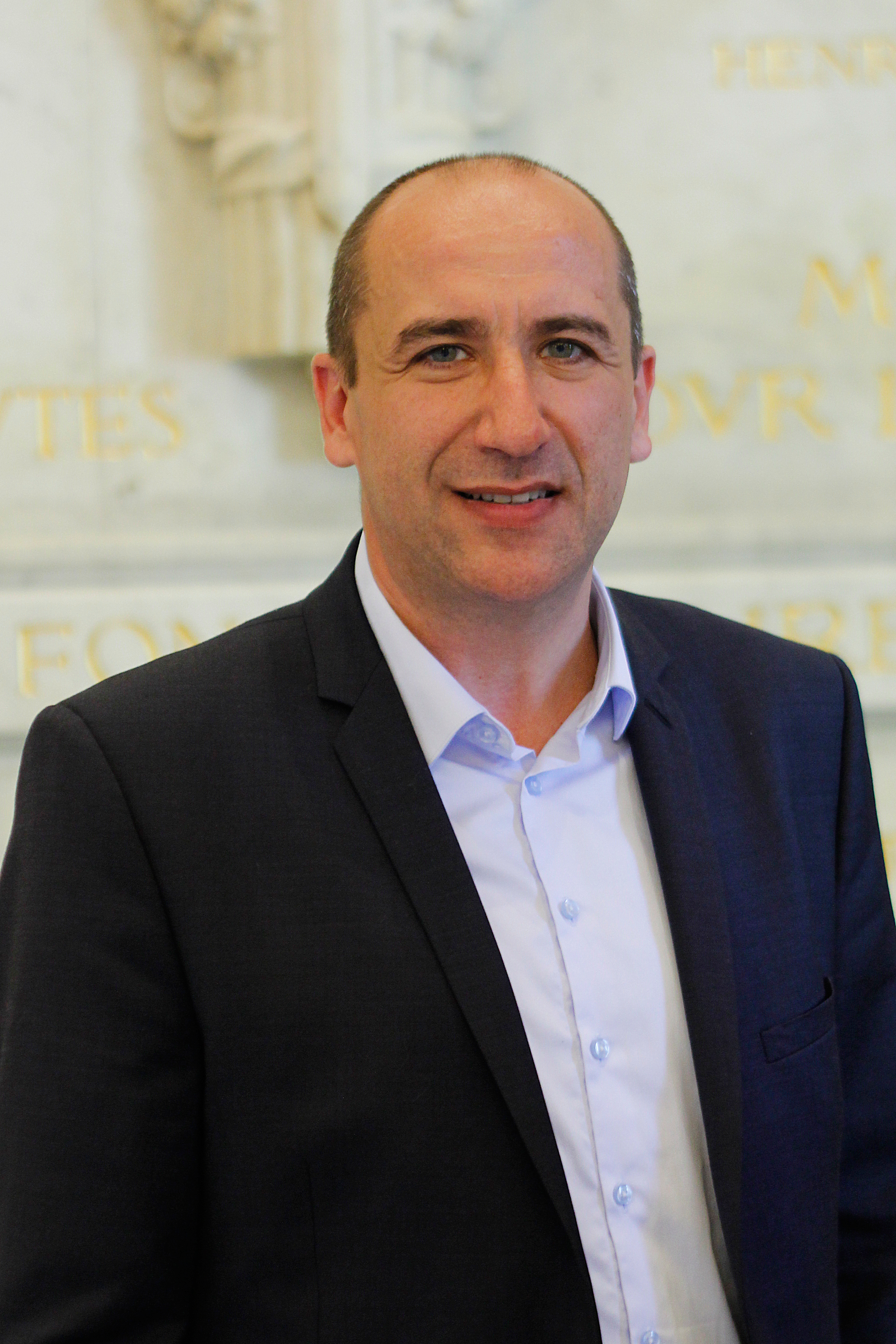

Member of the National Assembly for Val-d'Oise's 7th constituency
- In office 21 June 2017 – 9 June 2024
- Preceded by: Jérôme Chartier
- Succeeded by: Romain Eskenazi

Personal details
- Born: 30 June 1968 (age 57) L'Isle-Adam, France
- Party: Renaissance

Dominique Da Silva (born 30 June 1968) is a French politician of La République En Marche! (LREM) who has been serving as a member of the French National Assembly since the 2017 elections, representing the Val-d'Oise's 7th constituency.

== Political career ==
In parliament, Da Silva serves as a member of the Committee on Social Affairs. In this capacity, he is the parliament's rapporteur on health insurance.

== Political positions ==
In July 2019, Da Silva voted in favor of the French ratification of the European Union’s Comprehensive Economic and Trade Agreement (CETA) with Canada.

== See also ==
- 2017 French legislative election
