= Génération.s =

French political party

- Leader: Benoît Hamon
- Founder: Benoît Hamon
- Founded: 1 July 2017; 9 years ago
- Split from: Socialist Party
- Youth wing: The Young Generation·s
- Membership (2018): 50,000 (claimed)
- Ideology: Democratic socialism; Eco-socialism
- Political position: Centre-left to left-wing
- National affiliation: Les Écologistes (2020–present); New Popular Front (2024–present); New Ecological and Social People's Union (2022–2024)
- European political alliance: DiEM25; European Spring
- Colours: Pink; Teal
- National Assembly: 6 / 577
- Senate: 0 / 348
- European Parliament: 0 / 81
- Departmental councils: 6 / 4,108
- Regional councils: 13 / 1,757
- Presidency of departmental councils: 1 / 101
- Presidency of regional councils: 0 / 17

Website
- generation-s.fr

Génération·s (French pronunciation: [ʒeneʁɑsjɔ̃]) sometimes rendered Génération-s or Génération·s, is a French political party created on 1 July 2017 by Benoît Hamon who, according to its founder, aims to "refound and gather the left" in France. It was formerly named Mouvement du 1er Juillet (1 July Movement), and has also been known by the short name M1717. Its foundation followed the sharp decline of the Socialist Party in the 2017 presidential election, in which Hamon was the Socialist nominee, and the legislative elections, in which he lost his seat as deputy. The movement presents itself as an initiative to assemble the forces of the left in France.

== History ==
Logo of the 1st July Movement

According to its founder Hamon, the movement is "a totally open initiative" that seeks to "go beyond the party framework" and "converge" with other political figures that share its values. At the time of its founding, he announced his goal to unite the left before the 2019 European Parliament elections and the municipal elections in 2020, promoting an "Estates General of all the left to make a common house for the municipal elections of 2020". The party also aims to popularize ideas developed by Hamon during his presidential campaign that were abandoned by the party during the legislative campaign, such as universal basic income.

According to Hamon, 11,000 people participated in the creation of the movement. Prominent supporters included politicians Cécile Duflot and Yannick Jadot from Europe Ecology – The Greens (EELV), essayist Raphaël Glucksmann, journalist Edwy Plenel and economist Thomas Porcher.

Politicians joining the party included deputy Régis Juanico, former minister Dominique Bertinotti, MEP Guillaume Balas and former deputies Barbara Romagnan and Mathieu Hanotin.

In September 2017, the movement was invited to the Fête de l'Humanité, where it had its own stand beside that of Benoît Hamon. On the September 23rd, the movement took part in a protest march against the policies of Emmanuel Macron, which demonstrators described as a "social coup d'état". Hamon appeared publicly at the head of the procession alongside Jean-Luc Mélenchon of La France Insoumise, which organized the protest. On 2 October 2017, Laura Slimani, former president of the Young Socialists, left the Socialist Party to join the movement.

On 10 October 2017, a dozen regional councilors including Benoît Hamon left the socialist group of the regional council of Île-de-France to form a new group of about twenty advisers associating ecologists, called "Ecologist and Social Alternative". The same day, Pascal Cherki left the Socialist Party to join M1717.

On 2 December 2017, the new name "Génération·s" was chosen during the party's founding congress in Le Mans. During the congress, Hamon announced that he was preparing European-wide lists for the European Parliament election of 2019 with Yanis Varoufakis, the former Greek minister of finance and leader of DieM25.

In January 2018, the movement claimed to have reached 50,000 members and elected an interim direction.

Génération·s contested the 2019 European Parliament elections as part of DieM25, winning no seats and 3.27% of the popular vote.

Génération·s was part of NUPES for the 2022 French legislative election, and part of the New Popular Front electoral alliance for the 2024 French legislative election.

== Ideology ==
The political ideologies it supports are European federalism, eco-socialism, and democratic socialism. The project of Génération.s is based on the following principles:

- The construction of a society freed from capitalism and productivism.
- Priority to collective and public management of the most important resources.
- Respect for future generations in all decisions made today.
- Satisfying the real needs of human beings while respecting nature and living things.
- A vision that places human relationships above the accumulation of goods.
- A considerable reduction in inequalities and strict real equality between women and men, so that everyone has the power to live in dignity, beyond any discrimination.
- Independence in interdependence, on an individual level, of territories, countries, sectoral policies (social, environmental, democratic).
- Emancipation through education and the end of discrimination.
- A renewed democracy that gives citizens their place on a daily basis.
- International relationships based on cooperation and solidarity.
- The guarantee of social protection for all.

== Election results ==
=== National Assembly ===
National Assembly
Year	Votes	%	Seats	+/–	Result
2022	145,810	0.64	4 / 557	▲4	In coalition with the NUPES
2024	238,881	0.75	6 / 577	▲2	In coalition with the NFP

=== European Parliament ===
Election year	Votes	%	Seats	+/−
2019	741,772	3.27	0 / 79	▼3
