= Maud Gatel =

French politician

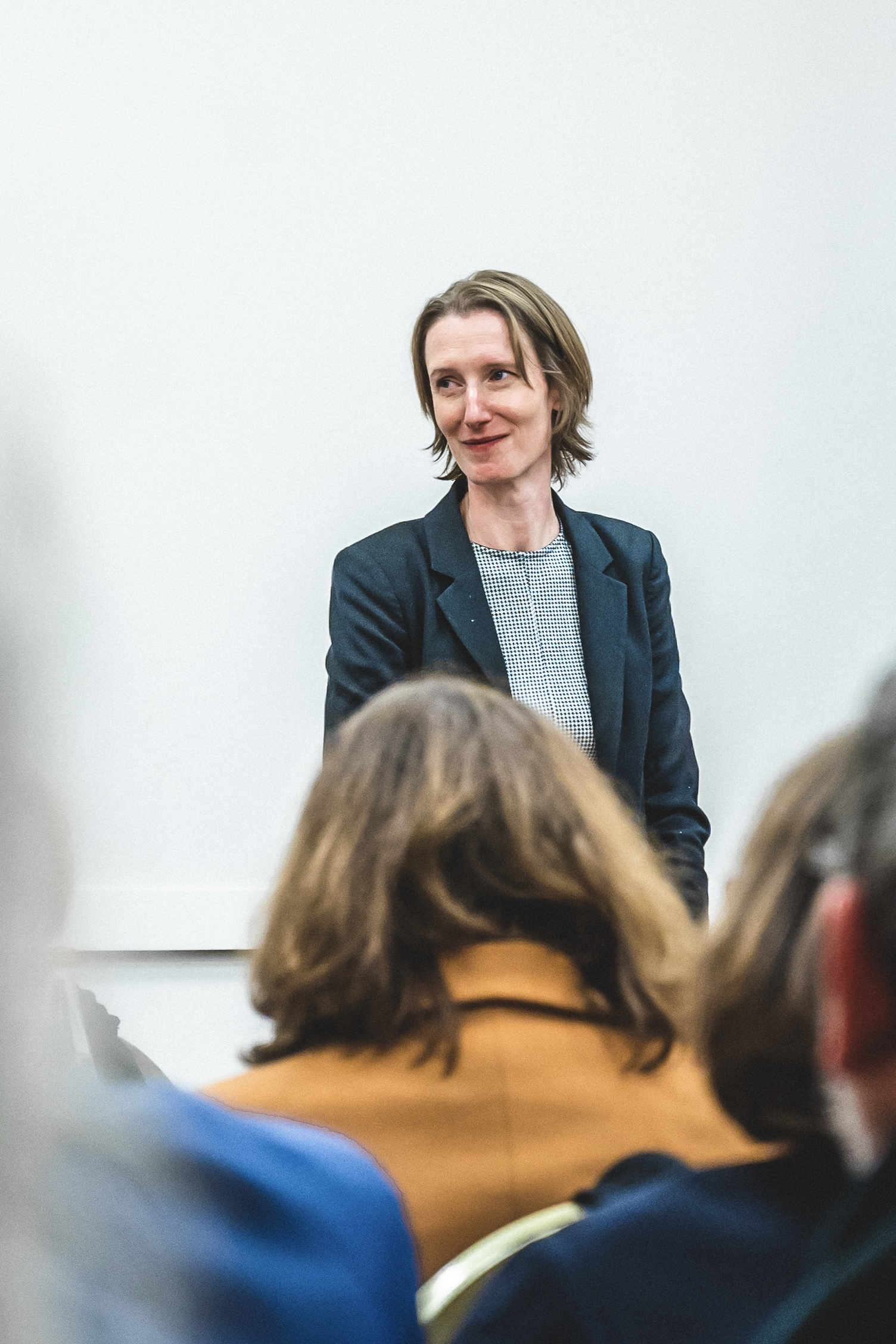

Member of the National Assembly for Paris's 11th constituency
- In office 14 January 2021 – 9 June 2024
- Preceded by: Marielle de Sarnez
- Succeeded by: Céline Hervieu

Councillor of Paris
- Incumbent
- Assumed office 30 March 2014

Personal details
- Born: 6 April 1979 (age 47) Saint-Maur-des-Fossés, France
- Party: Democratic Movement
- Education: Institut d'études politiques de Bordeaux; Cardiff University

Maud Gatel (born 6 April 1979) is a French politician of the Democratic Movement (MoDem) who was the member of the National Assembly for the 11th constituency of Paris from 2021 to 2024. She replaced Marielle de Sarnez after her death as her substitute. Her constituency covers parts of the 6th and 14th arrondissements. She has been a member of the Council of Paris since 2014.

== Political career ==
=== Career in local politics ===
Gatel was first elected to the Council of Paris in the 2014 municipal election. In 2020, she assumed the presidency of the MoDem group.

=== Member of the National Assembly, 2021–2024 ===
In 2021, Gatel became the member of the National Assembly for Paris's 11th constituency upon Marielle de Sarnez's death. She was re-elected in the 2022 French legislative election.

In parliament, Gatel has been serving on the Committee on Foreign Affairs. In addition to her committee assignments, she is part of the French parliamentary friendship groups with Ukraine, Portugal, Rwanda and Burundi.

She was unseated in the 2024 French legislative election by Socialist candidate Céline Hervieu.

Gatel was again a candidate in the 2026 Paris municipal election and was re-elected.
