= Romain Eskenazi =

French politician (born 1986)

Member of the National Assembly for Val-d'Oise's 7th constituency
- Incumbent
- Assumed office 18 July 2024
- Preceded by: Dominique Da Silva

Personal details
- Born: 4 May 1986 (age 40) Paris, France
- Party: Socialist Party
- Other political affiliations: New Popular Front

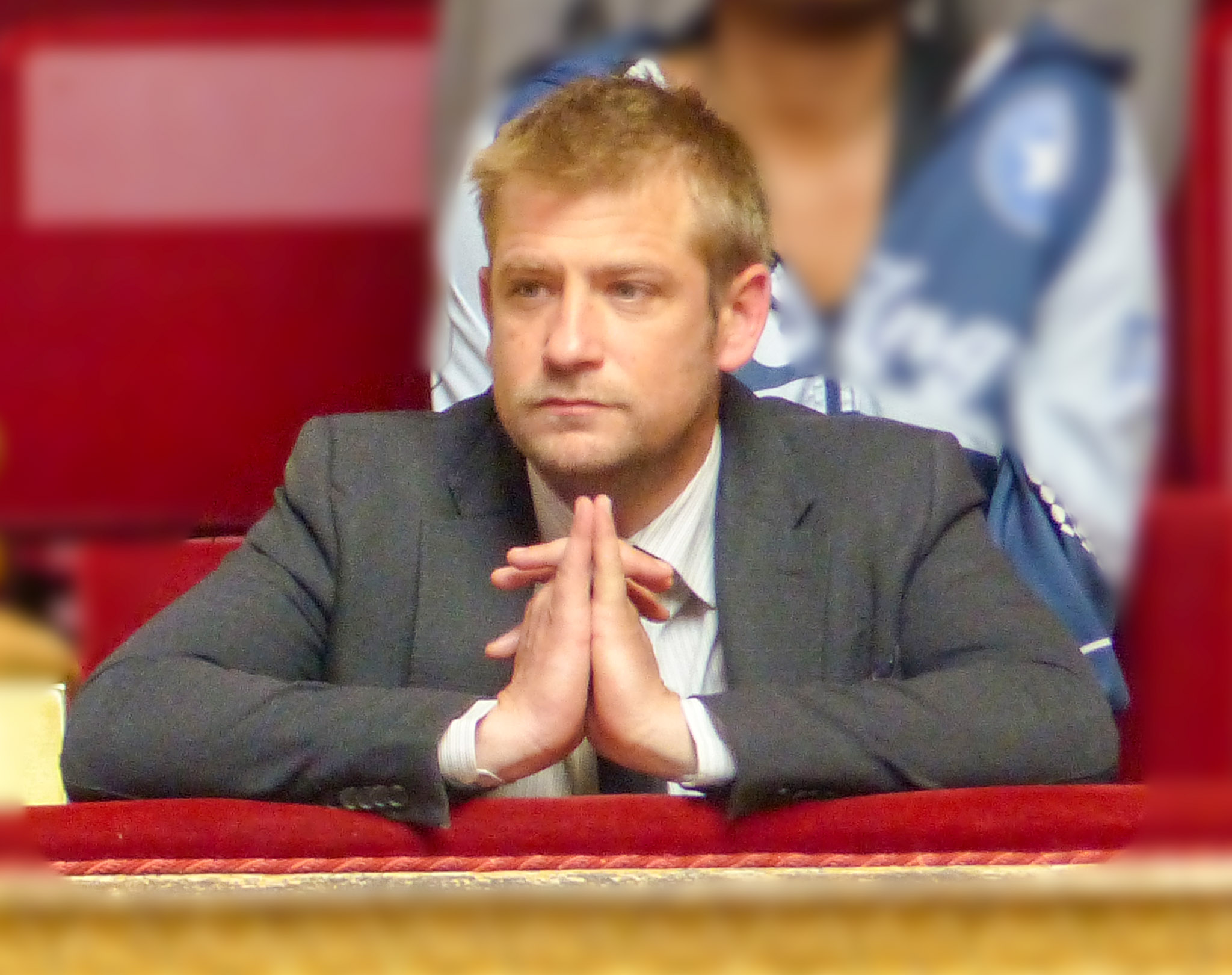

Romain Eskenazi (born 4 May 1986) is a French politician of the Socialist Party who was elected member of the National Assembly for Val-d'Oise's 7th constituency in 2024. He worked for the mayor of Gonesse from 2014 to 2020, and served on the city council of Montmorency. He was a candidate for the constituency in the 2022 legislative election, and a substitute candidate for the 2017 election.
