= TBS Education =

French business school founded in 1903

Coordinates: 43°36′35″N 1°25′54″E

- École Supérieure de Commerce de Toulouse
- Former name: Toulouse Business School / ESC Toulouse
- Type: Grande école (Private business school)
- Established: 1903; 123 years ago
- Accreditation: Triple accreditation: AACSB; AMBA; EQUIS
- Academic affiliations: Conférence des grandes écoles, University of Toulouse
- Location: Toulouse and Paris, France; Barcelona, Spain; Casablanca, Morocco
- Language: English, French, Spanish
- Website: www.tbs-education.com
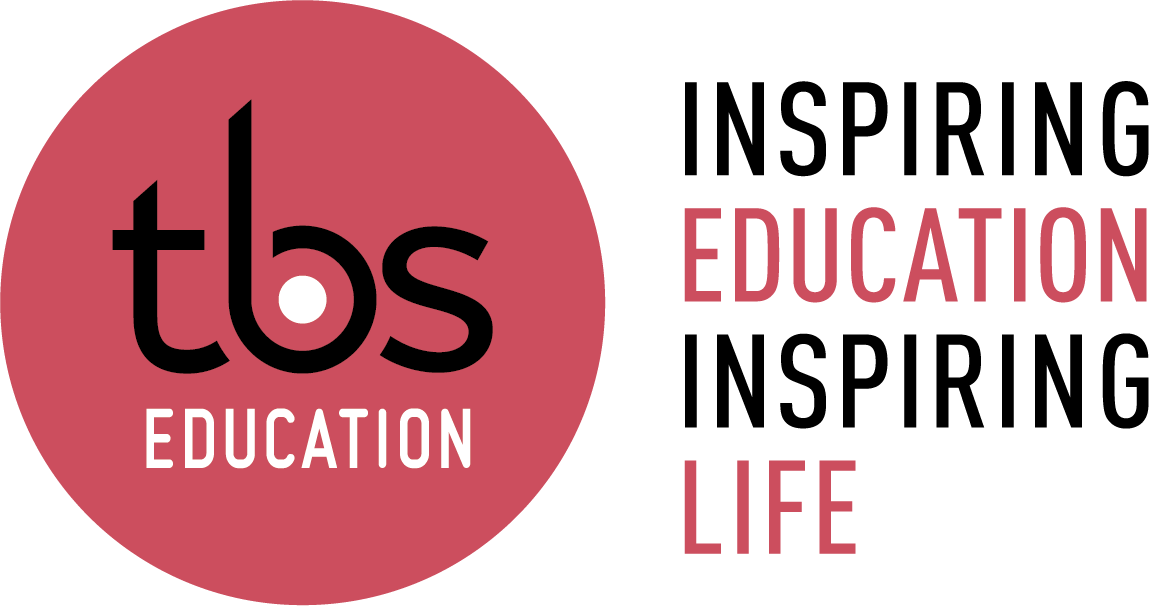

TBS Education, formerly Toulouse Business School and Groupe ESC Toulouse, is a French business school (grande école) founded in 1903 by the Toulouse Chamber of Commerce and Industry. The institution operates campuses in Toulouse, Paris, Barcelona, and Casablanca.

The school holds triple accreditation from EQUIS, AACSB, and AMBA. It is a member of the Conférence des grandes écoles and an associate institution of the University of Toulouse.

TBS Education offers undergraduate, graduate, and postgraduate programs in management, including a Bachelor in Management, a Master in Management (Programme Grande École), and a joint Doctor of Business Administration (DBA) with the Toulouse School of Management. The institution enrolls approximately 7,000 students.

== History ==
=== Foundation and early developments (1903–1990s) ===
TBS Education was founded in 1903 as the École Supérieure de Commerce de Toulouse (ESC Toulouse) by the Toulouse Chamber of Commerce and Industry to supply business administrators for the regional economy. In 1947, the school joined the unified national entrance examination system common to French business grandes écoles.

To accommodate growing student enrollment and modern facility requirements, the institution relocated its primary campus from central Toulouse to the newly developed Compans-Caffarelli business district in 1986.

=== International expansion ===
In the late 1980s and 1990s, the institution established permanent international operations. It opened an initial satellite presence in Morocco in 1987, which was consolidated into a permanent campus in Casablanca in 2001. In 1995, the school established a campus in Barcelona, Spain, which moved to the 22@ innovation district in 2022.

In 2006, ESC Toulouse partnered with the Toulouse School of Management (formerly IAE Toulouse) to offer a joint Doctor of Business Administration (DBA) program.

=== Corporate restructuring and name changes ===
The institution underwent several organizational changes during the 2010s and 2020s. In 2013, the school rebranded from ESC Toulouse to Toulouse Business School.

In December 2016, the school transitioned from a private non-profit entity to a Consular Higher Education Institution (Établissement d'enseignement supérieur consulaire, EESC), acquiring an independent corporate identity while maintaining governance ties with the Toulouse Chamber of Commerce. In 2021, the school adopted its current name, TBS Education, and registered as a mission-driven company (société à mission) under French law.

== Grande École System ==
=== Rankings ===
TBS Education is evaluated in international business school rankings published by the Financial Times and Quacquarelli Symonds (QS).

In the 2025 Financial Times European Business School Rankings, the institution was ranked 94th in Europe.

In the 2026 QS World University Rankings:

- The school was placed in the 301–350 rank band in the QS World University Rankings by Subject.
- In the Executive MBA category, it was ranked tied for 73rd globally, and 27th worldwide in the International Trade Executive MBA specialization.
- In the broader International Trade Masters and MBA category, the institution ranked 83rd worldwide.

== Campuses ==
TBS Education operates four urban campuses in France, Spain, and Morocco:

- Toulouse (France): The main campus is located in the central Compans-Caffarelli business district of Toulouse, housing the primary academic departments and research facilities. An additional site, Entiore, located in Quint-Fonsegrives, is dedicated to executive education and apprenticeship programs. The school is investing 120 million euros in a new campus in Toulouse.
- Barcelona (Spain): Established in 1995, the Spanish branch relocated in 2022 to a purpose-built facility in the 22@ innovation district of Barcelona.
- Casablanca (Morocco): Operating in Morocco since 1987, the school moved its campus in 2024 to the Casablanca Finance City (CFC) business hub.
- Paris (France): Located in the 15th arrondissement of Paris, this site hosts specialized Master of Science programs and executive education courses.

== Partnerships and alliances ==
=== Research ===
TBS Education conducts research in business management, economics, and social sciences.

Academic research is structured around specialized chairs and partnerships, notably the SIRIUS Chair—a public-private research initiative dedicated to space law and management created in collaboration with Toulouse 1 Capitole University, the French National Centre for Space Studies (CNES), Airbus Defence and Space, and Thales Alenia Space.

In doctoral education, the institution collaborates with the Toulouse School of Management (TSM) to offer doctoral training and a joint Doctor of Business Administration (DBA). The school also operates TBSeeds, an internal incubator supporting student and alumni entrepreneurship projects.

== Academic programs ==
TBS Education offers degree programs accredited by the French Ministry of Higher Education and Research across three academic cycles. The institution enrolls approximately 7,000 students.

- Undergraduate: A three-year Bachelor in Management holding the official national grade de licence.
- Postgraduate: The primary degree is the Master in Management (M.M.) delivered through the Programme Grande École, which holds the national grade de master. The school also awards specialized Master of Science (MSc) degrees and executive education, notably the International Executive MBA.
- Doctoral education: A research-based Doctor of Business Administration (DBA), offered jointly with the Toulouse School of Management.

== Notable alumni ==
- Damien Adam, Member of the French National Assembly
- Kamil H. Al-Awadhi, CEO of Kuwait Airways
- Virginie Calmels, politician and former CEO of Endemol France
- Jörg Guido Hülsmann, German economist
- Tibo InShape (Thibaud Delapart), web content creator and entrepreneur
- Omar Kabbaj, advisor to King Mohammed VI and former president of the African Development Bank
- Didier Lacroix, businessman and president of the Stade Toulousain rugby club
- Renan Luce, singer and songwriter
- Patrick Mwanri, CEO of Precision Air
- Nicolas Todt, motorsport CEO and founder of ART Grand Prix
