= Céline Hervieu =

French politician (born 1993)

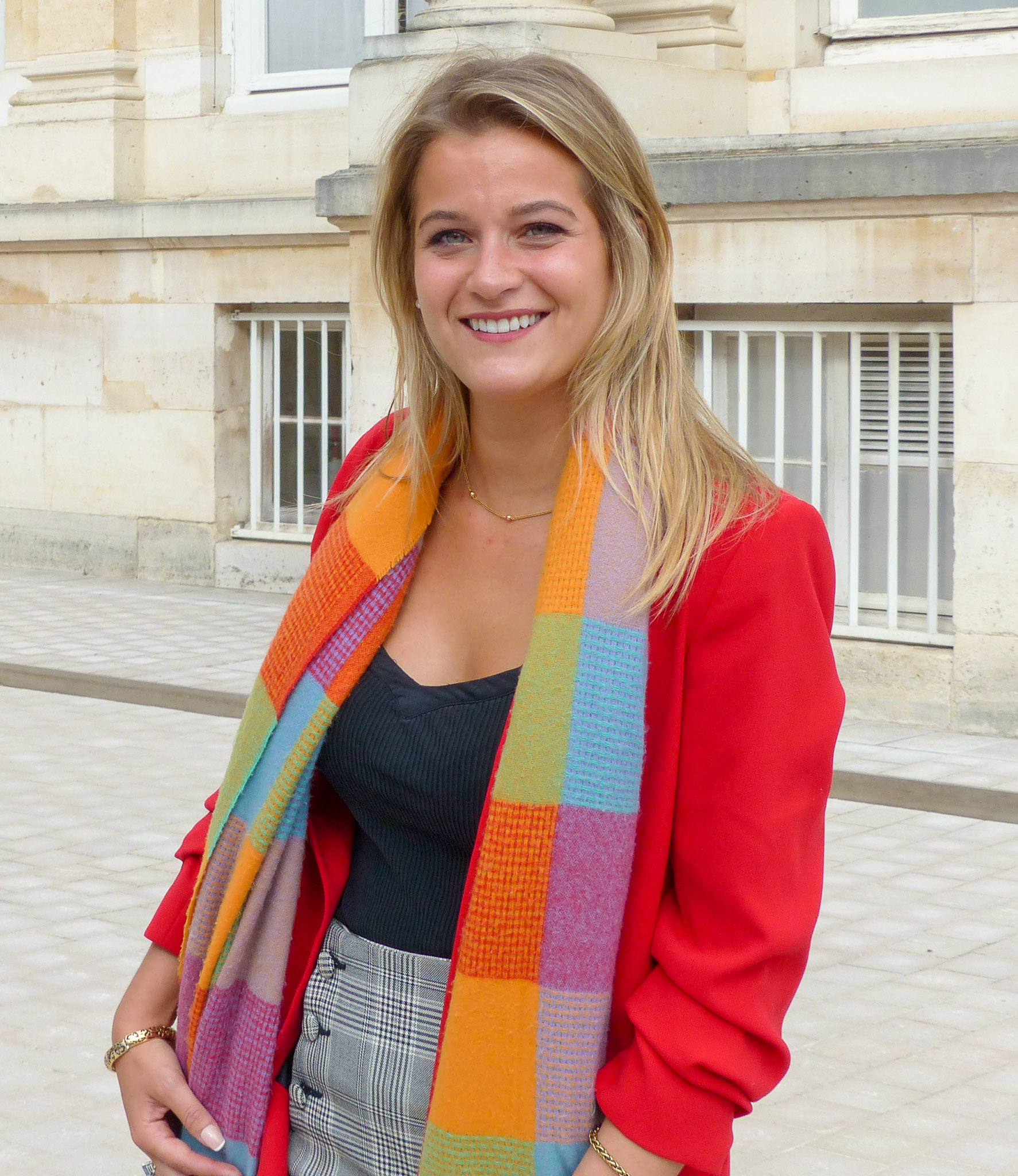

Member of the French National Assembly for Paris's 11th constituency
- Incumbent
- Assumed office 18 July 2024
- Preceded by: Maud Gatel

Personal details
- Born: 19 August 1993 (age 32) 13th arrondissement of Paris, France
- Party: Socialist Party (2014–present)

Céline Hervieu (born 19 August 1993) is a French politician of the Socialist Party who was elected member of the National Assembly for Paris's 11th constituency in 2024. She has been a member of the Council of Paris since 2020.

== Early life and career ==
Hervieu was born in the 13th arrondissement of Paris in 1993. Her mother is Brazilian, and moved to France at the age of 35. Since the age of 13 she has lived in the 6th arrondissement. She joined the Socialist Party in 2014, during the Syrian migrant crisis.

== Controversy ==
As member of Parliament for the affluent 6th arrondissement of Paris, where many celebrities and wealthy business leaders live, she came into the limelight for speaking against the opening of a convenience store of the Carrefour group.

Opponents claim that it will be an eye soar, encourage delinquency due to the more working class clients who will shop there.

Her stand was criticised for being classist and hypocritical given her pro-migrant advocacy and her being part of the leftist New Popular Front coalition.
