= Young Socialists (France) =

French Socialist Party's youth organization

The Young Socialists Les Jeunes Socialistes
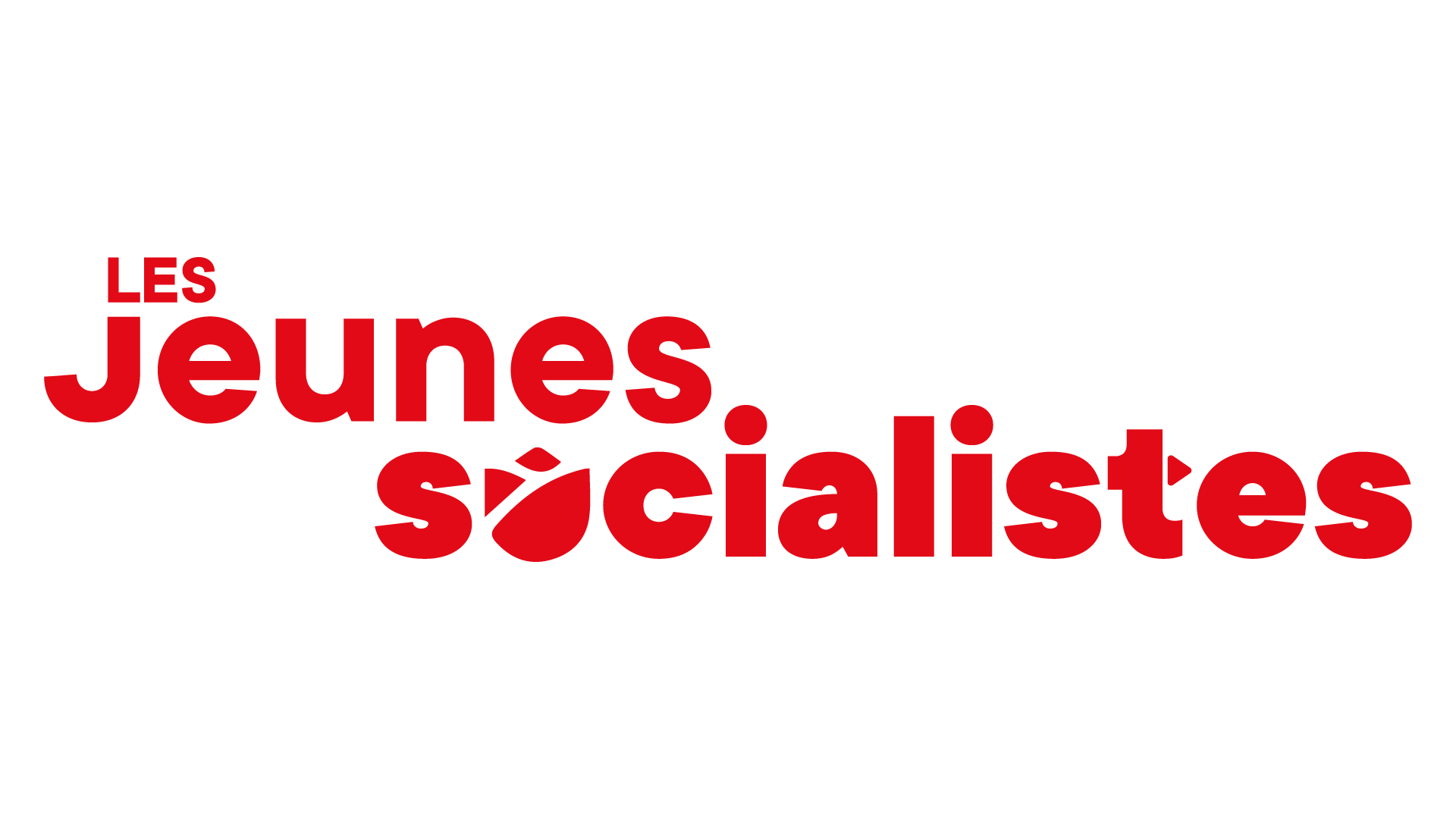
- President: Rémi Boussemart
- Founded: 1993
- Headquarters: Paris, France
- Ideology: Social democracy Democratic socialism
- Mother party: Socialist Party
- International affiliation: International Union of Socialist Youth
- European affiliation: Young European Socialists
- Website: www.lesjeunes-soc.fr

The Young Socialists (French: Les Jeunes Socialistes), formerly named Movement of the Young Socialists (MJS), is the youth organisation of the Socialist Party of France.

MJS was founded in 1993 as a formally independent youth organisation. However, its statutes commit the MJS to be generally supportive of its mother party. After a peak of around 10,000 members after the 2006 youth protests in France, MJS had 5,321 members in November 2009.

MJS is member of the Young European Socialists (YES, formerly ECOSY) and International Union of Socialist Youth (IUSY).

== Internal organization ==
In a biannual general assembly called Congrès National, all members of MJS come together to discuss and decide on general positions as well as concrete projects. There, the members also directly elect the president for a two-year period and appoint the members of the national office.

Of several political currents within the MJS, a coalition of the centrist "Transformer à Gauche" (Transform to the left) and the Marxist "Offensive socialiste" (Socialist Offensive) dominated the 2009 Congress of Grenoble, successfully nominating Laurianne Deniaud for president. A minority movement of "Jeunes Socialistes pour la renovation" (Young socialists for renewal) and "La Relève" (The Uprise) calling for organizational changes including more transparency and grassroots democracy couldn't prevail, neither could the civil libertarian wing.

=== National congresses ===
- 1993: Congress of Avignon
- 1995: Congress of Orléans
- 1998: Congress of Toulon
- 1999: Congress of Tours
- 2001: Congress of Lille
- 2003: Congress of Lamoura
- 2005: Congress of Paris
- 2007: Congress of Bordeaux
- 2009: Congress of Grenoble
- 2011: Congress of Strasbourg
- 2015: Congress of Lille
- 2018: Congress of Bondy
- 2023: Congress of Lille
- 2025: Congress of Nancy

=== Presidents ===
- 1993–1995: Benoît Hamon
- 1995–1997: Régis Juanico
- 1997–1999: Hugues Nancy
- 1999–2001: Gwenegan Bui
- 2001–2003: Charlotte Brun
- 2003–2005: David Lebon
- 2005–2007: Razzy Hammadi
- 2007–2009: Antoine Détourné
- 2009–2011: Laurianne Deniaud
- 2011–2013: Thierry Marchal-Beck
- 2013–2015: Laura Slimani
- 2015–2018: Benjamin Lucas-Lundy
- 2018–2018: Roxane Lundy
- 2018–2019: Collective leadership
- 2020–2025: Emma Rafowicz
- 2025–present: Rémi Boussemart
