= Pascal Cherki =

French politician (born 1966)

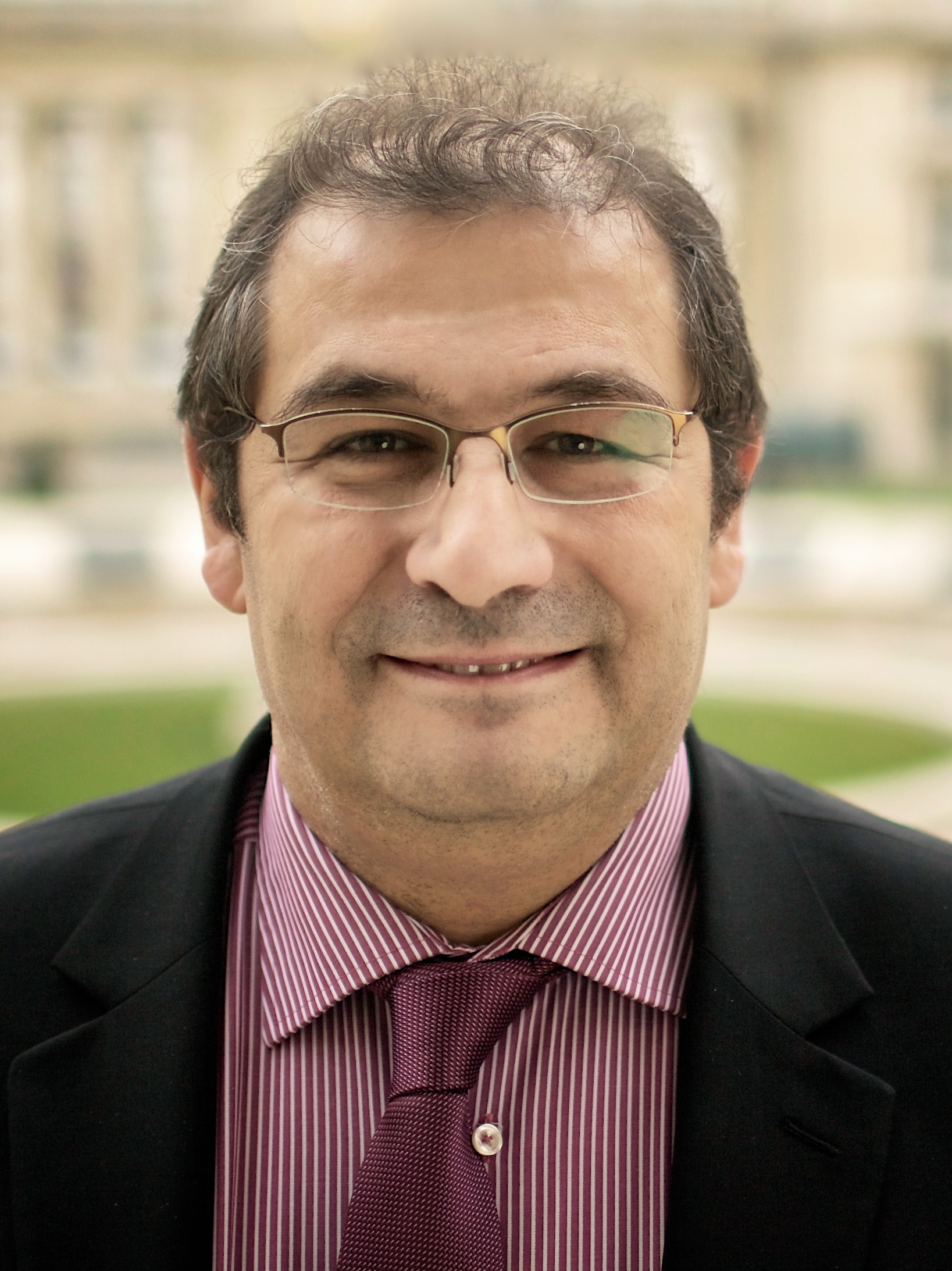
- Pascal Cherki in 2014

Councillor of Paris
- In office 23 March 2001 – 28 June 2020
- Mayor: Bertrand Delanoë; Anne Hidalgo

Member of the National Assembly for Paris's 11th constituency
- In office 20 June 2012 – 20 June 2017
- Preceded by: Jean Tiberi
- Succeeded by: Marielle de Sarnez

Mayor of the 14th arrondissement of Paris
- In office 7 March 2009 – 13 April 2014
- Preceded by: Pierre Castagnou
- Succeeded by: Carine Petit

Personal details
- Born: 1 September 1966 (age 59) Paris, France
- Party: 1 July Movement; Génération.s
- Profession: Lawyer

Pascal Cherki (born 1 September 1966) is a French politician. A member of the 1 July Movement, he served as a member of the National Assembly between 2012 and 2017 and the mayor of the 14th arrondissement of Paris (2009-2014).
