= Marielle de Sarnez =

French politician (1951–2021)

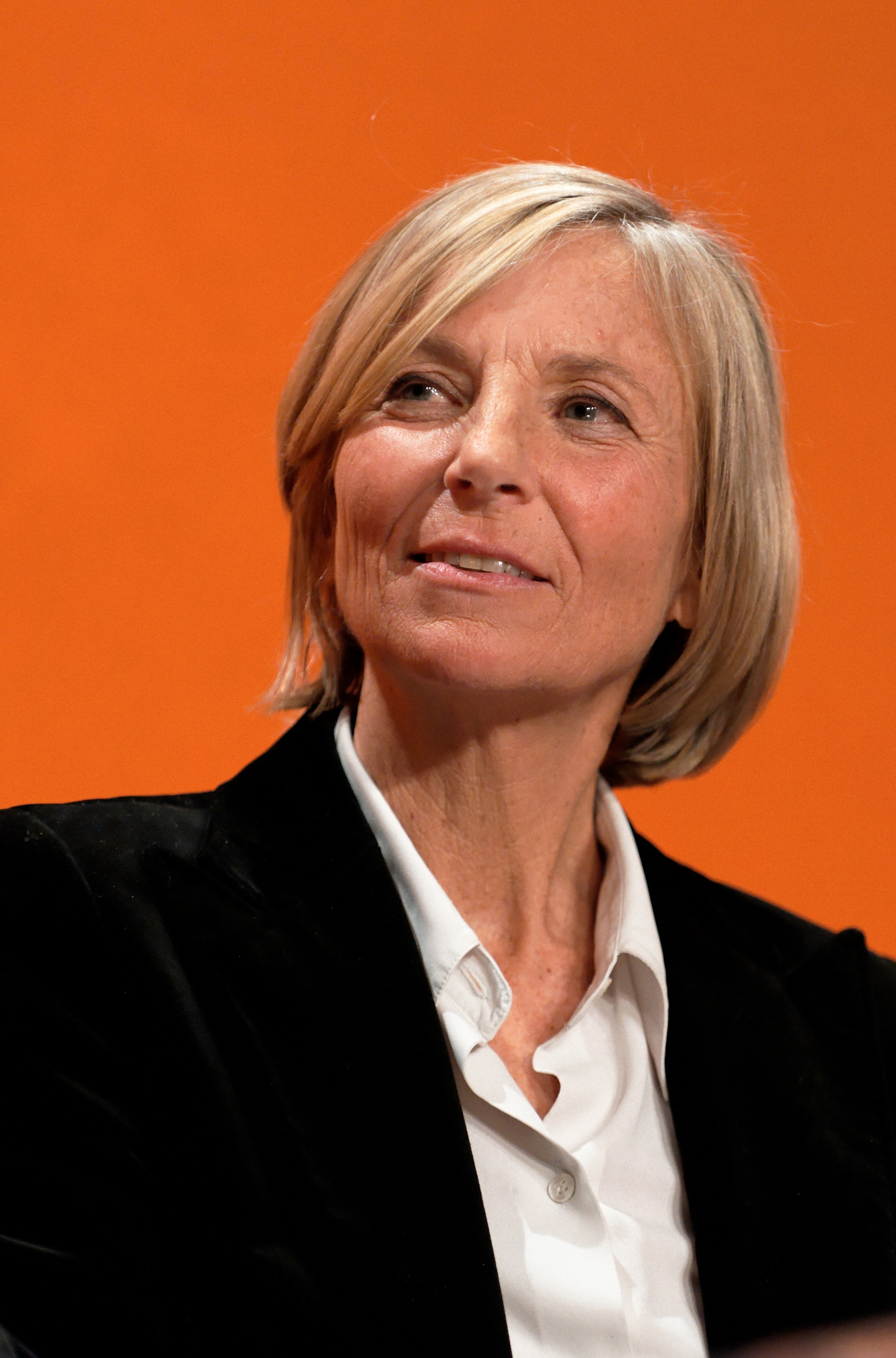
- De Sarnez in 2008

Minister for European Affairs
- In office 17 May 2017 – 19 June 2017
- Prime Minister: Édouard Philippe
- Preceded by: Harlem Désir
- Succeeded by: Nathalie Loiseau

Member of the National Assembly for Paris's 11th constituency
- In office 21 June 2017 – 13 January 2021
- Preceded by: Pascal Cherki
- Succeeded by: Maud Gatel

Member of the European Parliament
- In office 20 July 1999 – 17 May 2017
- Constituency: Île-de-France

Personal details
- Born: 27 March 1951 Paris, France
- Died: 13 January 2021 (aged 69) Paris, France
- Cause of death: Leukemia
- Party: Democratic Movement (2008–2021)
- Other political affiliations: Union for French Democracy (1978–2008)

Marielle de Sarnez (French: [ma.ʁjɛl də saʁ.nɛz]; 27 March 1951 – 13 January 2021) was a French politician who served as Secretary of State for European Affairs under Prime Minister Édouard Philippe.

A member of the Union for French Democracy (UDF) until 2008 when she joined the Democratic Movement (MoDem), de Sarnez was a Member of the European Parliament (MEP) from 1999 until her appointment as Minister for European Affairs in the Phillipe government in 2017. De Sarnez resigned after a month due to a scandal involving alleged payment for work she did not perform, but was elected a few days later to represent the 11th constituency of Paris in the National Assembly. She was a committed Europeanist and centrist, pushing the MoDem to resist currents on each end of the political spectrum. De Sarnez was a longtime collaborator to party president and three-time candidate for the presidency of France, François Bayrou.

== Early life ==
Marielle de Sarnez was born in the 8th arrondissement of Paris on 27 March 1951 and grew up in an aristocratic family with close ties to the French political establishment. From 1961 to 1967, her Gaullist father Olivier de Sarnez, who had been in the French Resistance, was chief of staff to Roger Frey, Interior Minister, and her mother was responsible for floral arrangements at the Élysée Palace. Nevertheless de Sarnez joined the May 1968 protests while still a high school student, was kicked out of Lycée Sainte-Marie de Passy Catholic girls school and participated in the occupation of neighboring boys school Lycée Jean-Baptiste Say. (Her father was elected as a deputy to the National Assembly on the Gaullist conservative Union of Democrats for the Republic—UDR—ticket a month later.) After earning her high school degree from Lycée La Fontaine, de Sarnez began working in retail rather than continuing her studies.

== Career ==
=== Early career ===
In 1973, Ladislas Wroblewski, who cofounded the Independent Republicans (RI) party with Valéry Giscard d'Estaing, offered de Sarnez a part-time role as secretary of the Young RI arm. At RI, she met Jean-Pierre Raffarin, who went on to become prime minister; Dominique Bussereau, who became president of the Assembly of the Departments of France; and eventual Minister of Justice Pascal Clément. She was involved in the Presidential campaign the next year, creating popular "Giscard à la barre" ("Giscard at the helm”) t-shirts. Giscard d'Estaing was elected and de Sarnez rose quickly through the ranks.

Initially the movement and her place in it felt modern to de Sarnez, but she grew disappointed by the rightward turn, especially the anti-abortion politics, that the new administration adopted, and wished Giscard d'Estaing had taken the opportunity to break from the right-wing UDR (predecessor to the Rally for the Republic, RPR) and form a majority government without them. Failure to do so, she later said, left the Giscardians "hostages" to the right. Noticing this, as well as de Sarnez's early advocacy for the European cause, in 1979 French politician and abortion rights advocate Simone Veil offered de Sarnez a slot on her list for the European elections (when Veil became president of the European Parliament). De Sarnez, who had a ten-month-old daughter and a son on the way, declined at that time, later saying she was glad to have waited for a more compatible political partner.

Giscard d'Estaing was defeated in the 1981 French presidential election. De Sarnez later said that despite personal disappointment, she did not entirely regret the political changes brought by President François Mitterrand, of the Socialist Party (PS).

=== Work with François Bayrou ===
In 1978, de Sarnez co-founded the Union for French Democracy (UDF), aimed at developing a center-right coalition to back Giscard d'Estaing and provide a counterweight to the Gaullist right. From 1986 to 1989, she served as special advisor to the chair of the UDF group in the National Assembly, Jean-Claude Gaudin.

In this milieu she met François Bayrou, with whom she worked closely for the next 40 years. The two became close working on Raymond Barre's campaign for President in 1988 and were soon inseparable. "Elle, c'est moi, et moi, c'est elle" ("I'm her and she is me") he told those who occasionally tried to drive a wedge between them. When Bayrou became Secretary General of the UDF in 1989, she joined him as his deputy, then likewise at the Ministry of National Education (1993 to 1997) in the government of Alain Juppé. Initially she was an adviser, but then became Director of his Private Office, the first French woman to hold such a senior role without a degree from the École nationale d'administration. From 1997 to 1998, she was the secretary-general of the UDF group in the National Assembly. After the Plural Left won the 1997 legislative elections, in 1989 through 1993 de Sarnez became Secretary-General of the opposition general assembly, while Bayrou was President of UDF. She went on to become national secretary of the UDF, from 2003 to 2007.

De Sarnez, who earned a reputation as an outstanding organizer—Raffarin described her as a "gifted politician"—also served as campaign manager for Bayrou's 2007 and 2012 presidential campaigns. Each time, Bayrou, a center-right candidate running under the UDF banner, failed to advance to the second (final) round. In 2002, they earned 6.84% of the first-round vote, a fourth-place finish while the neo-Gaullist right-wing (RPR) and extreme-right (National Front, FN) candidates Jacques Chirac and Jean-Marie Le Pen, respectively, advanced. Along with much of the political establishment, Bayrou threw his support behind Chirac. In 2007, it was 18.57% (Nicolas Sarkozy, a right-wing candidate then running with the Union for a Popular Movement (UMP) and Socialist Party (PS) candidate Ségolène Royal advanced) and 9.13% in 2012 (Sarkozy and PS candidate François Hollande advanced). The 2007 election loss nevertheless marked a significant turning point, as Bayrou announced publicly he would not vote for Sarkozy, breaking from the dominant right-wing UMP to form the centrist Democratic Movement (MoDem). De Sarnez became its First Vice-President. The UMP's successor the Republicans (LR) blamed Bayrou (and retaliated) for Sarkozy's loss and a number of UDF members split to create the New Centre party to support Sarkozy, leaving only three MoDem deputies in the National Assembly, including Bayrou, not enough to form their own group in the legislature. Ex-comrades accused de Sarnez of having creating a vacuum around Bayrou. A 2007 profile in Le Monde describes de Sarnez's role with Bayrou: "Nothing is done without her consent."

In the 2016 presidential primary held by LR, de Sarnez endorsed Alain Juppé over Sarkozy, but both lost in a surprise upset by François Fillon. Bayrou, in consultation with de Sarnez, decided not to run in the 2017 French presidential election and they both instead supported Emmanuel Macron of La République En Marche! as an alternative centrist candidate, ultimately successful.

=== Role in Europe ===
While de Sarnez made her name as "the woman who made Bayrou", he also encouraged her to strike out as a candidate herself, insisting, "She's not a number two. She's a number one." Devoted to the cause of a unified Europe, she began her elected career in 1999 as a member of the European Parliament (MEP) for Île-de-France, heading the UDF list in 2004 and serving until 2017. A member of the UDF before 2008 and MoDem after 2008, de Sarnez served as vice-chair of the Alliance of Liberals and Democrats for Europe, and sat on the European Parliament's Committee on Culture and Education. She was in the forefront for Orange Revolution in Ukraine, and it inspired the choice to make orange the signature color of MoDem. She also took a particular interest in the EU's Erasmus Mundus, expanding on the popular Erasmus program to create opportunities for students outside Europe to study in its universities as well. In the contentious 2005 French referendum on ratifying the European Constitution, de Sarnez supported ratification. Although the measure failed, de Sarnez praised the "democratic moment" of the entire nation reading and debating the text. In 2009, she published a short book called Petit dictionnaire pour faire aimer l'Europe (A Brief Dictionary for Loving Europe). The book covers 80-odd subjects in 250 pages, appealing to a vision of Europe that centers equity in its relationship with the rest of the world.

De Sarnez was a substitute for the Committee on Foreign Affairs, a member of the Delegation for relations with South Africa, and a substitute for the delegation to the EU–Chile Joint Parliamentary Committee. In 2016, she served as the parliament's rapporteur on a plan to lend Tunisia €500 million on favourable terms to help it reduce its external debt and consolidate its democratic mechanisms. In addition to her committee assignments, de Sarnez was a member of the European Parliament Intergroup on Children's Rights.

In May 2017, de Sarnez left the European Parliament upon her appointment as French Minister for European Affairs. Reporting from Le Canard enchaîné shortly thereafter alleged that de Sarnez had been paid for work she had not actually done, embroiling her and Bayrou in a jobs scandal. Prosecutors opened an investigation into whether assistants to de Sarnez as an MEP had actually been paid for work done for the MoDem party in Paris. Both she and Bayrou (the new Minister of Justice) resigned, just before the 2017 legislative election in which de Sarnez was a candidate with Emmanuel Macron's newly formed party, La République En Marche! Prime Minister Édouard Philippe announced that Bayrou would not be a part of the government. On 21 June 2017, Nathalie Loiseau succeeded de Sarnez as the minister for European affairs.

=== Representative of Paris ===
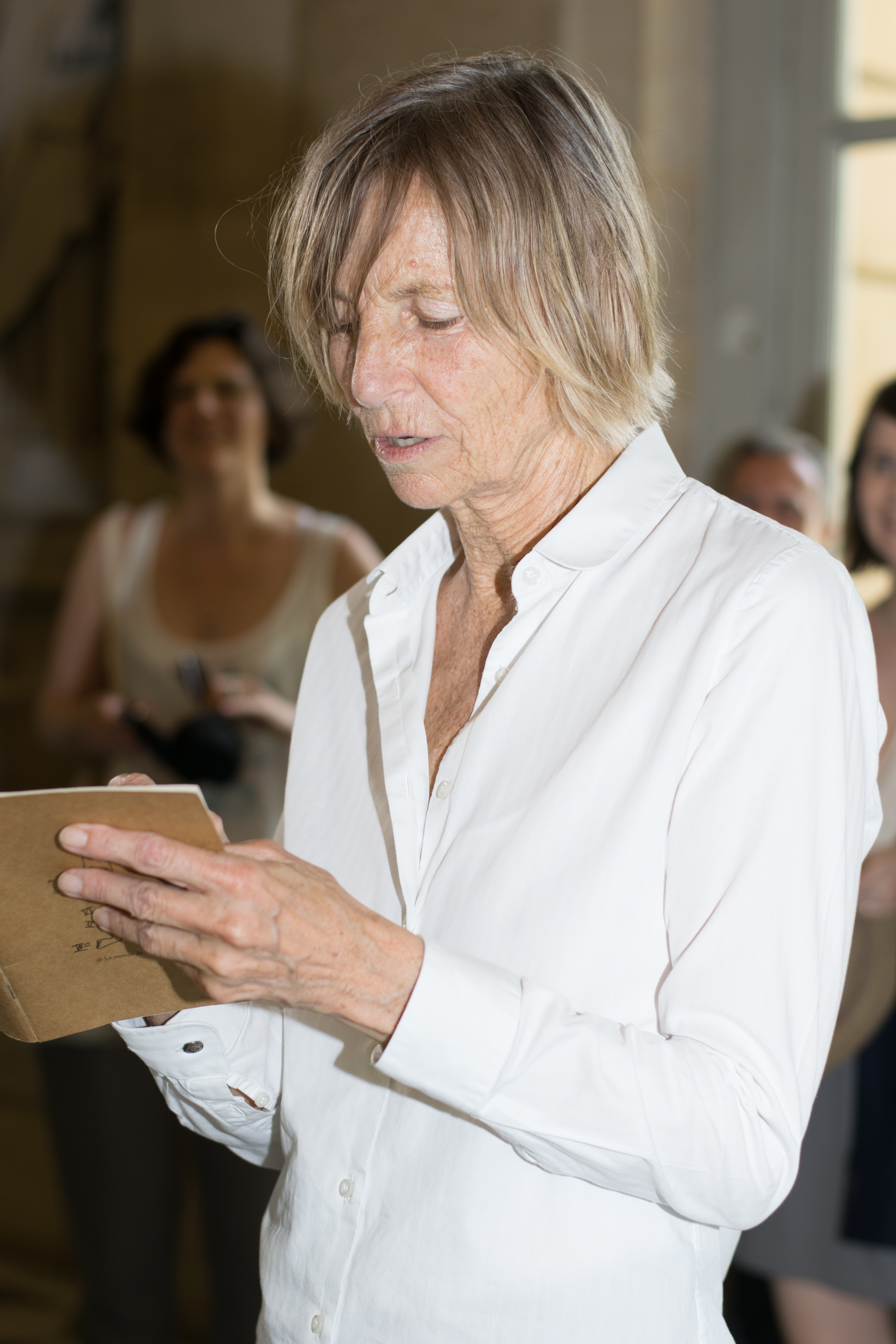
De Sarnez during her first week in the National Assembly in 2017

Despite the timing of the scandal, de Sarnez, who was also a councillor (joint RPR-UDF slate) for the 14th arrondissement of Paris from 2001 to 2010 and from 2014 to 2020, was elected Deputy to the National Assembly for the 11th constituency of Paris on 18 June 2017.

De Sarnez became chair of the Foreign Affairs Committee, serving in that capacity from 2017 to 2021.

On 24 April 2018, De Sarnez was among the guests invited to the state dinner hosted by U.S. President Donald Trump in honor of President Emmanuel Macron at the White House.

On 31 May 2019, she led a delegation of the committee on a visit to the Autonomous Administration of North and East Syria and the Syrian Democratic Council in Ayn Issa. After de Sarnez’s death in 2021, she was succeeded as deputy by Maud Gatel.

== Personal life ==
De Sarnez married Philippe Augier (later Mayor of Deauville) and had two children, circa 1979. She separated from Augier in 1988. A private person, de Sarnez kept a small circle of friends and strictly enforced her preference that her personal life stay out of the media spotlight. She was known for her uniform of jeans and Converse sneakers.

De Sarnez died of leukemia in Pitié-Salpêtrière Hospital in Paris on 13 January 2021, at age 69. French leaders across the political spectrum sent public messages mourning her death, including President Macron and his rivals in the 2017 election, extreme-right FN candidate Marine Le Pen and hard left candidate Jean-Luc Mélenchon; as well as current Prime Minister Jean Castex and de Sarnez's longtime professional partner Bayrou. The National Assembly observed a minute of silence and Le Monde wrote, "One of the pillars of the house of centrism has fallen."

== Works ==
- Sarnez, Marielle de (2009). Petit dictionnaire pour aimer l'Europe (in French). Paris: B. Grasset. ISBN 978-2-246-75491-6.
