= Charlotte Brun =

French politician (born 1976)

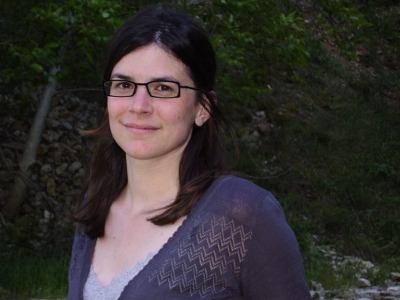

Member of the Municipal council of Lille
- Incumbent
- Assumed office 30 March 2014
- Mayor: Martine Aubry

President of the Young Socialist Movement
- In office 2001–2003

Personal details
- Born: 9 December 1976 (age 49) Eaubonne, France
- Party: Socialist Party
- Education: Pantheon-Sorbonne University

Charlotte Brun (born 9 December 1976) is a French politician who served as the first female president of the Young Socialist Movement from 2001 to 2003. She has been a member of the Socialist Party since its establishment in June 2001, and she worked closely with Benoît Hamon, the latest representative of the Socialist Party in the presidential race, on his campaign in 2016, In November 2008, Brun joined the Socialist Party's motion of censure, "Un Monde d'avance" during the national congress of the French Socialist Party known as the Reims Congress. She was elected as the fifth assistant mayor of Lille in March 2014. She is in charge of political education and representation of the Wazemmes quarter.

== Education ==
Brun received her Baccalauréat from Lycée Victor-Duruy in Paris in 1996 and her degree in Contemporary History from the University of Paris 1 Panthéon Sorbonne in 2001.

== Career ==
Brun worked as a parliamentary assistant for the Senate from 1997 to 2000, while she was attending the University of Paris 1 Panthéon Sorbonne. In 2001, she joined the Young Socialist Movement and served as the first female president of the movement. She remained in that position until 2003. In the same year that she began her term as president of the Young Socialist Movement, Brun worked as a communications assistant to the mayor of Ecouen, France, a community in the suburbs of Paris, until 2008. Brun initiated her career as a teacher at Ezanville high school in 2007. She taught history, geography, and civil education for six years. From 2010 to 2014, Brun was a first assistant to the mayor and in charge of sustainable development and transportation infrastructure. Brun moved to Lille, France in 2014 where she taught history, geography, and civil education for less than a year. Since moving to Lille, Brun has worked as an assistant to the mayor of Lille. She is responsible for education, educational policies, and support for parenthood. She is also serving as the President of the Wazemmes Neighborhood Council and a Community Advisor at Lille Métropole Communauté urbaine (LMCU). In 2015, Brun started teaching at Jean-Jaures high school.

== Socialist Party ==
Brun has been a member of France's Socialist Party since 2001. She was a national secretary of the party from 2008 to 2014, and during this time period, she helped to initiate movements such as "Un monde d'avance" while representing elderly, disabled, and dependent individuals. As a prominent member of the Socialist Party, Brun was a representative of the educational system in Benoit Hamon's presidential campaign. Her job was to answer questions and be the liaison between the political realm and the educational system.

== Societal impact ==
Brun has been a representative for many individuals in France including the elderly, disabled, and students. Her representation of groups of people facilitates the French society by enabling people to focus on their careers while ensuring that they are properly spoken for.
