= Yves Cochet =

French politician

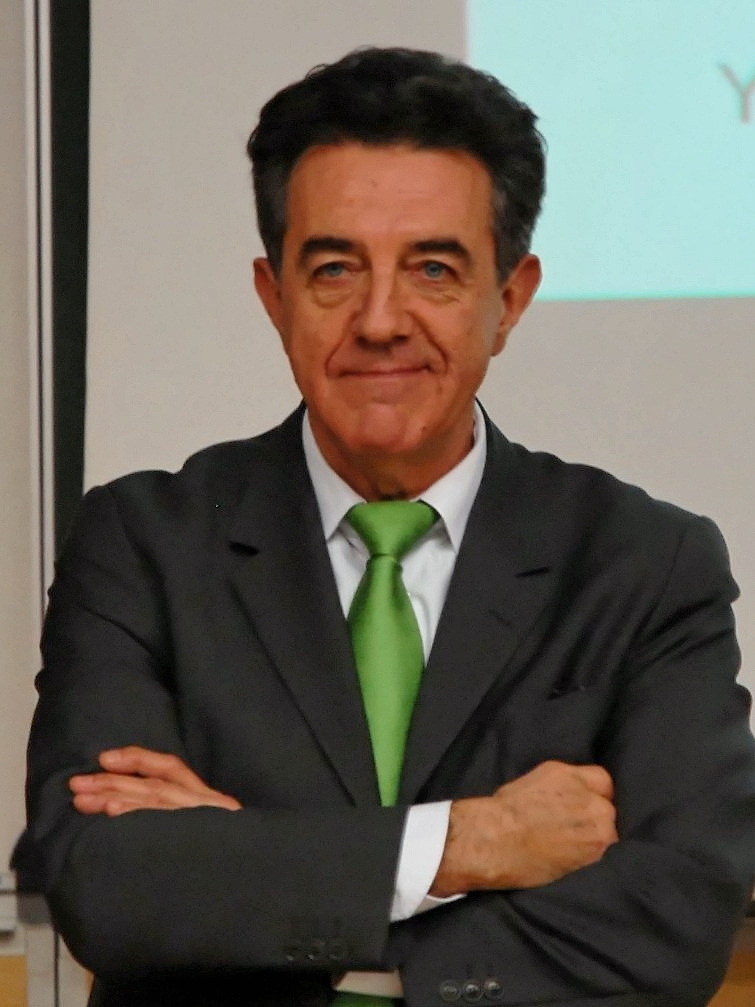
- Cochet in 2007

Member of the European Parliament
- In office 7 December 2011 – 30 June 2014

Member of the National Assembly for Paris's 11th constituency
- In office 19 June 2002 – 6 December 2011
- Preceded by: Nicole Catala

Minister of Environment and Regional Planning
- In office 10 July 2001 – 6 May 2002
- President: Jacques Chirac
- Prime Minister: Lionel Jospin
- Preceded by: Dominique Voynet
- Succeeded by: Roselyne Bachelot

Personal details
- Born: 15 February 1946 (age 80) Rennes, France
- Party: The Greens
- Education: University of Rennes
- Profession: Computer scientist

Yves Cochet (French pronunciation: [iv kɔʃe]; born 15 February 1946) is a French politician, member of Europe Écologie–The Greens. He was minister in the government of Lionel Jospin. On 6 December 2011, he was elected member of the European Parliament (MEP).

He studied Mathematics and became researcher-lecturer at Institut National des Sciences Appliquées of Rennes in 1969. In June 1971, teaming with Maurice Nivat, he obtained a PhD for his research on « Sur l'algébricité des classes de certaines congruences définies sur le monoïde libre ».

== Publications ==
- Yves Cochet et Maurice Nivat, « Une généralisation des ensembles de Dyck », Israel Journal of Mathematics, vol. 9, nº3, septembre 1971, p. 389–395 ISSN 0021-2172.
- Sauver la Terre (avec Agnès Sinaï), éd. Fayard, Paris, 2003 ISBN 2-213-61701-5.
- Pétrole apocalypse, éd. Fayard, Paris, 2005 ISBN 2-213-62204-3.
- Antimanuel d'écologie, éd. Bréal, Rosny-sous-Bois, 2009 ISBN 978-2-7495-0845-0.
- George, Susan; Dupuy, Jean-Pierre; Latouche, Serge; Cochet, Yves (15 February 2012). Où va le monde ? 2012–2022 : une décennie au devant des catastrophes (in French). Fayard/Mille et une nuits. ISBN 9782755504941.
- Yves Cochet (1 September 2019). Devant l'effondrement. Essai de collapsologie (in French). Paris: Les Liens qui libèrent. ISBN 979-1-02-090737-0.
