= Michel Roussin =

French political figure

Minister for Cooperation
- In office 30 March 1993 – 12 November 1994
- President: François Mitterrand
- Prime Minister: Édouard Balladur
- Preceded by: Marcel Debarge
- Succeeded by: Bernard Debré

Personal details
- Born: 3 May 1939 (age 86) Rabat, Morocco
- Party: RPR

Michel Roussin (born May 3, 1939 in Rabat, Morocco) was the chief of staff of Alexandre de Marenches, who directed the SDECE French secret service until the May 1981 election of François Mitterrand as President of France. Michel Roussin has also been chief of staff of Jacques Chirac when he was mayor of Paris and also when he was prime minister.

Roussin then became minister of cooperation under Édouard Balladur's government. However, he had to resign, in accordance with the so-called Balladur jurisprudence because of suspected involvement in various affairs concerning the illegal funding of Chirac's Rally for the Republic (RPR) party. Jailed for a time, Roussin was afterwards acquitted. However, on October 26, 2005, he was condemned to four years of prison on probation and a 50,000 EUR fine for his role in the corruption affair concerning high schools in the Paris region.

Named to the direction of SAE International, a construction firm linked to Paribas bank, Roussin in 1997 followed this function with his presidency of the Africa committee of the MEDEF, the French employers organization; the francophonie delegation at Paris's municipal hall. He also presented himself as candidate to the presidency of the Elf Aquitaine oil company. Roussin is also allegedly a member of the masonic lodge Grande Loge Nationale Française (GLNF).

== Timeline ==
- 1972-76: Military commander at the Hôtel Matignon, residency of prime minister Jacques Chirac.
- 1977-81: Chief of staff of Alexandre de Marenches at the SDECE.
- 1983: Worked for the president of the Compagnie Générale des Eaux
- 1984-86: Chief of staff of Jacques Chirac at the Paris municipal hall and then at Matignon
- 1993-94: Minister of cooperation under Edouard Balladur's government.
- 1994: Investigated in the frame of the "Jean-Claude Méry affair". He resigns from his ministerial functions, but is then acquitted.
- 1996: President of SAE International, a subsidiary of the Eiffage group. He is charged of a special committee on Africa by the Medef's direction.
- 1999: Death of Jean-Claude Méry.
- 2000: Daily newspaper Le Monde publish the integral content of Jean-Claude Méry's posthumous videocassette, in which Jean-Claude Méry, member of the executive committee of the RPR party, declared having given 5 million francs in cash to Michel Roussin, then Chirac's chief of staff, "in the presence of Mr. Chirac". Investigative magistrate Eric Halphen would convoque on these grounds president Chirac as witness in March 2001.

== See also ==
- Corruption scandals in the Paris region
