= Balladur jurisprudence =

Unwritten rule in French government

The "Balladur jurisprudence," named after former French Prime Minister Edouard Balladur, is an unwritten rule according to which a member of the French government who has been indicted in a judicial affair should resign from his functions. It is misnamed, as it was in fact the Socialist Prime Minister Pierre Bérégovoy who imposed this for the first time by forcing Bernard Tapie, then Minister of the City, to resign in May 1992. That political custom effectively came to an end when Emmanuel Macron, despite abiding to the rule in the first part of his presidency, chose to maintain his confidence in Minister of Justice Dupond-Moretti when indicted in 2021 over suspected conflict of interest.

== The Balladur cabinet ==
Various governmental personalities were forced by Balladur to resign after being indicted by the French justice, mostly for corruption affairs. Those included Alain Carignon, who resigned in July 1994 and was sentenced to five years of prison in 1996; Michel Roussin, indicted in the frame of the corruption scandals in the Paris region (condemned in 2005 to four years of prison on probation); Gérard Longuet, indicted in the same scandals as Michel Roussin (and acquitted in 2005) and for a minor affair concerning the building of his villa in Saint-Tropez (acquitted in 1998).

== The Jospin cabinet ==
In November 1999, Dominique Strauss-Kahn resigned from his functions in Lionel Jospin's Plural Left cabinet, in agreement with the "Balladur jurisprudence." He was later acquitted of all charges

== The Fillon cabinet ==
After the June 2007 legislative election, Prime Minister François Fillon broke for the first time with this informal rule by appointing André Santini, indicted in the Fondation Hamon affair on charges of corruption, Secretary of State.

== See also ==
- French political scandals
- Politics of France
