= Claude Chirac =

Daughter of former President of France Jacques Chirac

- Born: 6 December 1962 (age 63); Paris, France
- Education: Lycée de la Tour; Panthéon-Assas University
- Spouse: Frédéric Salat-Baroux (m. 2011)
- Children: 1
- Parent(s): Jacques Chirac; Bernadette Chirac

Claude Chirac, ComM (born 6 December 1962) is the youngest daughter of French president Jacques Chirac and was her father's personal advisor from 1994 until his death in 2019.

== Biography ==
Chirac is the director of communication at PRTP.PA which is part of Kering SA, a luxury group based in Paris, France. The group owns many luxury brands such as Italian labels Gucci and Bottega Veneta, French label Yves Saint Laurent as well as English label Alexander McQueen.

She had a relationship with Thierry Rey, the 1980 Summer Olympics and World gold medal champion in Judo. Martin Rey-Chirac is their son.

Since 11 February 2011, Chirac has been married to former general secretary of the Élysée, Frédéric Salat-Baroux.

== Honours ==
- 3rd Class of the Order of the Cross of Terra Mariana, Estonia
- Commander of the National Order of Benin (8 February 1996)
- Knight of the Legion of Honour, France (14 April 2017)
- Officer of the Order of Merit of the Italian Republic, Italy (21 October 1999)
- Commander of the Order of Merit, Portugal (8 July 1999)
