= Frédéric Salat-Baroux =

French civil servant

Chief of staff of President of France
- In office 2005–2007
- President: Jacques Chirac
- Preceded by: Philippe Bas
- Succeeded by: Claude Guéant

Personal details
- Born: 12 July 1963 (age 63) Paris, France
- Spouse: Claude Chirac (m. 2011)
- Children: 3
- Relatives: Jacques Chirac (father-in-law); Bernadette Chirac (mother-in-law)
- Education: ESCP Europe; Sciences Po, ÉNA

Frédéric Salat-Baroux (born 12 July 1963) is a French civil servant serving as the chief of staff of President Jacques Chirac between 2005 and 2007.

== Personal life ==
On 11 February 2011, Salat-Baroux married Claude Chirac, daughter of President Jacques Chirac

== Bibliography ==
- Éric Hazan with Frédéric Salat-Baroux, Révolution par les territoires, une réponse française aux défis du monde. Paris, Editions de L'Observatoire, 2025. ISBN 979-10-329-2304-7
