= Alexandre de Marenches =

French intelligence officer (1921–1995)

Count Alexandre de Marenches
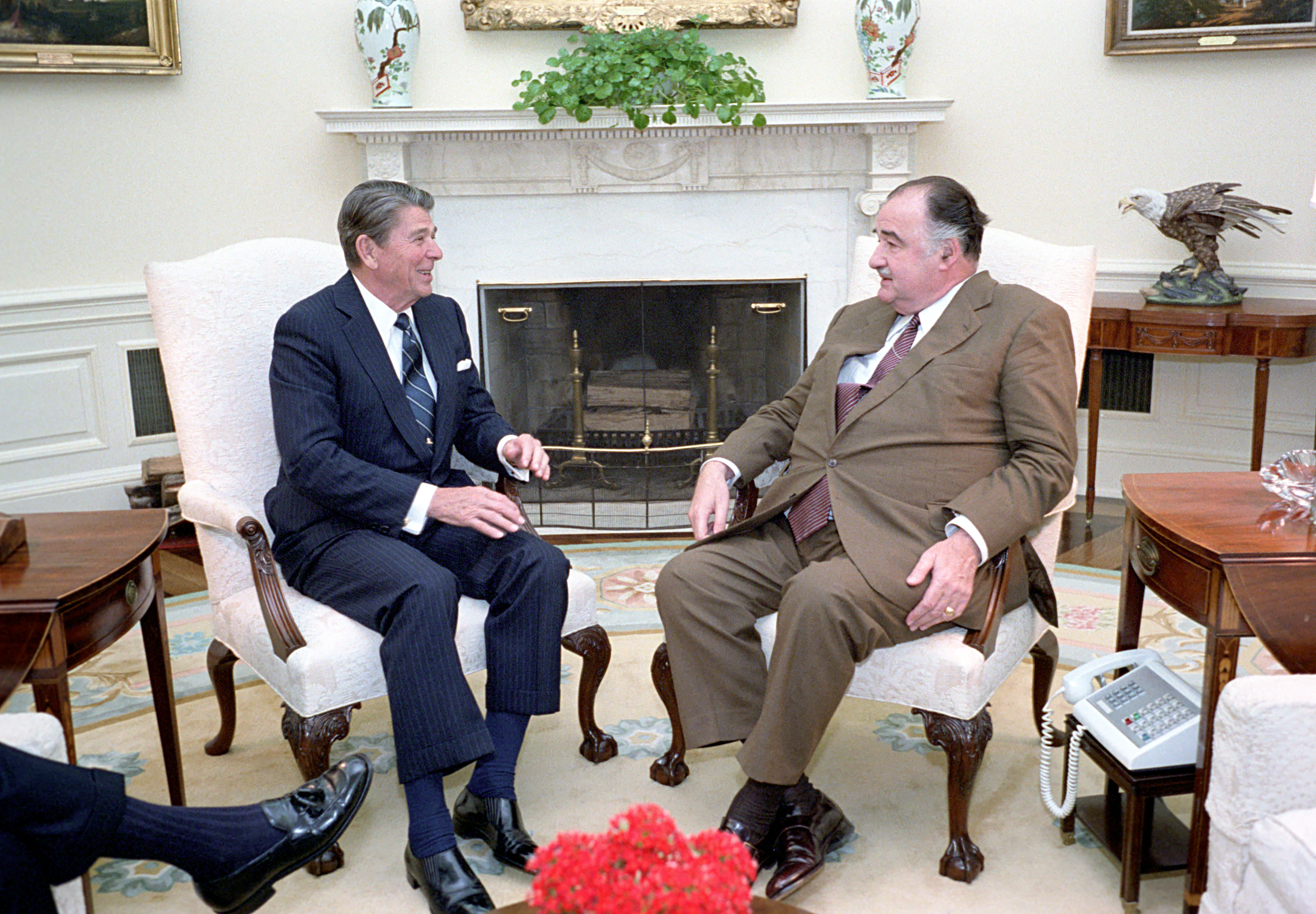
- de Marenches (right) in a 1983 meeting with U.S. President Ronald Reagan in the Oval Office
- Born: 7 June 1921; Paris, French Third Republic
- Died: 2 June 1995 (aged 73); France
- Military career
- Allegiance: France
- Other work: Director of the SDECE

Alexandre de Marenches, also known as ′Comte de Marenches′, (7 June 1921 – 2 June 1995) was a French military officer, a director of the SDECE French external intelligence services (6 November 1970 – 12 June 1981), special advisor to US President Ronald Reagan, and a member of the Academy of Morocco and the initiated the clandestine Safari Club that ran covert operations around Africa. From the late 1970s onwards, he was one of the founding fathers of the concept of an Islamic bulwark against the ″spread of communism″. He was the driving force behind the secret war in Afghanistan.

== Family ==
He was the only son of Captain Charles-Constant-Marie de Marenches, a French aristocrat from an old family of knights of Norman origin, an aide-de-camp to Marshal Ferdinand Foch and, together with Aldebert de Chambrun a representative of Marshal Philippe Pétain to General John J. Pershing. His mother, Margaret Clark Lestrade, (7 May 1881 New York – 3 May 1968 Paris) was a US citizen of distant French descent.

Marenches was a wealthy rentier and by virtue of his family background, very right-wing. He saw communists everywhere, to the point of believing that the KGB might have killed his own son.

== Early life ==
In his memoirs, as in his interviews, he often implied that he had been a prominent member of the Resistance and a great combatant in the Second World War.

In his youth, Marenches met many of the Allied leaders of World War I, including Marshal Foch and General Pershing. Marshal Philippe Pétain was a witness at his parents' wedding. In 1939, as Count de Marenches, he joined the cavalry of the army and entered the field of intelligence by informing his relatives and contacts in the US of German activities in France in 1940. He narrowly escaped arrest by the Gestapo in 1942 by crossing the Pyrenees on foot and making his way to Algiers. He joined the French resistance there and played a distinguished role in the Italian Campaign. Wounded at the Battle of Monte Cassino, he became aide-de-camp to General Alphonse Juin, the commander of the French forces in Italy (1943 — July 1944). There, Marenches helped coordinate the US military, the French expeditionary corps, and the eventual successful Allied advance into Rome.

After the war, he ventured into industry but remained in the Army Reserve and ultimately reached the rank of colonel. In 1962, he resigned in protest to President Charles de Gaulle's policy in Algeria.

== Appointment by Pompidou ==
He was eventually chosen to head the French intelligence services by French President Georges Pompidou mainly because of Marenches's perceived independence and integrity. Pompidou was aware that factions in the intelligence services had been circulating defamatory rumours for the last six months of de Gaulle's presidency on his wife and himself. Other rumours alleged Pompidou's involvement with the film star Alain Delon, whose bodyguard had been found murdered in September 1968.

Some agents had taken the opportunity to smear Pompidou in revenge taking very firm action against some of their colleagues involved in the kidnapping of Ben Barka, the leader of the Moroccan opposition in 1965. Marenches was brought in to clear up the factions. The fact that Marenches had been close to de Gaulle's former comrade-in-arms, Alphonse Juin, may have also played a role in the original choice.

In 1970, he was installed as head of the SDECE, the forerunner of the current DGSE. He deliberately carried out Pompidou's instruction to clean up the service and was indifferent to any protests on his actions. He began to travel and to meet with other governments to pursue the interests of France in different parts of the world.

From 1975 onward, all the major clandestine operations began, notably in the Central African Republic, where the SDECE deposed President Jean-Bédel Bokassa.

== Under Giscard d'Estaing ==
He had such authority that when Giscard d'Estaing succeeded Pompidou as president in 1974, Marenches kept his position for 11 years. Tellingly, when Pompidou died, and the key to his personal safe was deemed lost, Marenches was found to be in possession of another one. In chapter 7 ("Serving Two Masters") of his autobiography and in The Fourth World War, Marenches says that Pompidou's safe in the Elysee Palace was opened by one of the Secret Services' safecrackers only after Marenches had summoned Pompidou's son and his chef du cabinet as witnesses to its contents.

Under Giscard d'Estaing, Marenches tried to awaken interest in the former Portuguese colonies in Africa, and when Giscard d'Estaing protested that they were a long way away, he answered, "Yes, but they are getting nearer". Like many others in the intelligence community, Marenches resented Giscard d'Estaing's lack of concern about the communist threat and, more generally, about Giscard's deliberate ignorance that "History is tragic". More specifically, Marenches was adamant that France should continue supporting the pro-Western rebel leader Jonas Savimbi in the Angolan Civil War with the aim of installing a pro-Western regime in Angola, whereas Giscard wanted to discontinue French aid by 1978. Marenches decided to disobey Giscard and maintained a clandestine arms export to Savimbi's UNITA. In 1980, Marenches personally visited Savimbi's rebel base.

== Achievements ==
It is difficult to assess Marenches's achievements. Some believed that while he was one of the busiest figures on the intelligence circuit, some of his pronouncements (such as those on the Soviet Union) were based on slander. Others noted how he successfully cultivated his contacts in the Middle East, pushed the sales of Dassault Mirage fighters, and helped to establish a relationship with Iraq that persisted.

In Africa, sometimes working with the old Gaullist emissary Jacques Foccart and sometimes behaving as his rival, Marenches strengthened France's traditional strongholds.

He co-founded the Safari Club, a "private intelligence group [which was] one of George H. W. Bush's many end runs around congressional oversight of the American intelligence establishment and the locus of many of the worst features of the mammoth BCCI scandal." The Safari Club involved a number of states, including Saudi Arabia (which financed the operations), Morocco, Egypt and Iran, and was intended to counter Soviet operations in the Middle East and Africa.

An interlocutor with many heads of state in the world and a close friend of King Hassan II of Morocco, he was elected member of the Academy of Morocco. After the election of Ronald Reagan to the presidency of the United States, he would have become, according to the American journalist Colley, one of his closest advisers doing business in Afghanistan.

Im Dans le secret des princes, he states he was asked by an American journalist, who was a distant relative, where he could go in the world to write an article on an important geopolitical situation that was almost unknown. Marenches proposes several places. The journalist answers that he wanted one place. Marenches chooses randomly Afghanistan, because of the threat of a Soviet invasion. The journalist asked US National Security Advisor Zbigniew Brzezinski if Afghanistan could be an interesting place to write. Brzezinski said that it was not an interesting place. The journalist left for Kabul, "arriving in the same time as the Soviet tanks did", just a coincidence.

Marenches also conceived Operation Mosquito. In a meeting with Reagan at the White House, he suggested for the Drug Enforcement Administration to take all the drugs confiscated and supply them covertly to the Soviet Army in Afghanistan. In a few months, he explained, it would be demoralized, and its fighting ability would be gone. Marenches added, according to his published memoirs, that a few trusted people could do all that at a cost of approximately a million dollars.

Marenches also told Reagan that the United States controlled only four of the eight strategic raw materials and that the Soviets controlled all of them.

Édouard Balladur knew Marenches well from when they were both working closely with Pompidou. When Balladur was prime minister, he was due to preside over a medal-awarding ceremony. He was suddenly unable to attend and so asked Marenches to take his place. That was a serious mark of Balladur's respect and friendship.

At 6'4" and heavily built, he was called Porthos in reference to the character in The Three Musketeers. Charismatic and colourful, he was popular for his valour and patriotism.

== Resignation ==
After the French Socialist Party came to power in 1981, Marenches resigned that year because of the presence of the French Communist Party in the government. He disapproved of the new organization of security. He was particularly scathing about the fiasco of the Rainbow Warrior, but he accepted a seat on the Constitutional Council.

== Publications ==
In 1986, along with journalist Christine Ockrent, he co-authored a book, Dans le secret des princes ("In the Princes' Secret", published in English as The Evil Empire: Third World War Continues) about his days working in secret services. Claims were made on concealed archives with evidence of collaboration with Germans by figures of the French Resistance during the French Occupation.

In 1988, he published in French an Atlas géopolitique.

In 1992, along with David A. Andelman, he co-authored The Fourth World War: Diplomacy and Espionage in the Age of Terrorism, a book in which he predicted the rise of terrorism as a new form of warfare. The book became popular following the September 11 attacks.

== See also ==
- Michel Roussin, Alexandre de Marenches's chief of staff
