= Jean-Claude Méry =

French political organiser (1942-1999)

- Born: 29 June 1942; Casablanca
- Died: 11 June 1999 (aged 56); L'Haÿ-les-Roses
- Political party: Rally for the Republic

Jean-Claude Méry (born June 29, 1942, in Casablanca – died June 11 or June 9, 1999 in L'Haÿ-les-Roses) was a promoter and member of the central committee of the Rally for the Republic, and played a central role in the Paris HLM scandal and the illegal fundraising for the RPR. He died of cancer on June 11, 1999. He left behind a recorded video confession known as the Méry tape scandal.

Due to his influence, he was often nicknamed "Méry-de-Paris" or "the fat one".

== Financial accusation ==
In the summer of 1994, a financial accusation was initiated against Francis Poullain, an entrepreneur close to Gaullist circles and CEO of SAR, in the context of the power struggle that preceded the 1995 French presidential election between Jacques Chirac's and Édouard Balladur's supporters. This procedure led to the arrest and indictment of Jean-Claude Méry, a real estate developer, on September 29, 1994.

Charged with "trafficking of influence, complicity in the misuse of company assets, and violations of billing legislation," Méry was accused of benefiting from false invoices paid by companies interested in public contracts for the renovation of HLM (low cost housing) in Paris, Hauts-de-Seine department, and Île-de-France regional council through his Parisian consulting firms. His diaries revealed that this vast system of hidden fundraising (amounting to 38 million francs until 1993) involved numerous individuals close to the RPR.

From the beginning of Judge Éric Halphen's investigation, Jean-Claude Méry was identified as the "fund collector" for Chirac's movement and an influential figure at Paris City Hall, barely disguising the functions that his "consultant" plaque was supposed to conceal.

== Jean-Claude Méry's diaries ==
On October 28, 1994, Rémy Halbwax, a former police unionist and collaborator of Robert Pandraud, president of the RPR group in the Île-de-France regional council, was indicted and imprisoned. His name appeared in Jean-Claude Méry's diaries.

Michel Roussin, whose name also appears in one of Jean-Claude Méry's diaries and who was the Minister of Cooperation in the Balladur government and former chief of staff to Paris mayor Jacques Chirac in 1992, was indicted on November 14, 1994, for complicity in misuse of company assets after resigning. He is suspected of having acted as an intermediary in the false invoices affair, from which the RPR allegedly benefited in exchange for large sums of cash. A non-prosecution decision was made on December 15, 1995.

== The Swiss accounts ==
In 1995, a shell company called Farco Enterprise was discovered in Switzerland. This Panamanian company's beneficial owner was Jean-Claude Méry, and it held an account at a bank in Geneva. Investigators found evidence of transfers made by Lyonnaise des Eaux in 1992, when one of its subsidiaries was awarded a share of the lucrative elevator market for Paris HLM office.

In Geneva, the account manager for Farco stated: "The company Farco was created at the end of 1990 for the needs of Mr. Jean-Claude Méry. We knew he was a member of the RPR apparatus. He probably needed this company for political financing." These statements, gathered during a letter of request in Switzerland, were reproduced in Le Monde on May 14, 1996.

== Political funding ==
According to the order for trial issued by investigating judge Armand Riberolles, Jean-Claude Méry "was tasked with ensuring the funding of this party's political activities by collecting funds, particularly from companies supplying Opac."

Jean-Claude Méry informed businesses about ongoing contracts. He obtained a suspension of the official designation of a winner from the HLM office, allowing him to extract the price of his influence. Jean-Claude Méry created false invoices in exchange for his interventions (totaling 38.7 million francs). The prosecution noted the "emptiness" of the titles.

Some companies paid him directly into a Swiss account: Fargo, 10 million francs over five years, two-thirds of which were withdrawn in cash. The "envelopes" distributed by Méry long held the attention of investigators, with his secretary even naming a few high-profile political figures, although nothing could be proven.

On December 9, 1994, two executives from the company CG2A, a subsidiary of Générale des eaux, were indicted for "misuse of company assets and complicity in violations of billing legislation." They are suspected of paying a 13 million franc commission to Jean-Claude Méry to secure a contract with the Paris HLM office.

== The Méry tape ==
On May 24, 1996, the former key figure in the secret finances of the RPR sat down in front of Arnaud Hamelin's camera and recounted his story, which would become known as the "Méry tape".

On September 22, 2000, Le Monde published part of the posthumous confessions of Jean-Claude Méry. Alain Belot, then the lawyer for the RPR's shadowy financier, revealed during his custody that he had given the original confession tape to Dominique Strauss-Kahn, with whom he worked from 1988 to 1991.

Between 2002 and 2004, the investigations conducted by Judge Armand Riberolles validated the content of the video tape in which Méry, the shadowy financier of the RPR, claimed to have handed 5 million francs in cash to Jacques Chirac in October 1986. However, Armand Riberolles did not draw the same conclusions as his predecessor.

== Bibliography ==
- Les Dessous d'une présidence, Jean-Pierre Thiollet, Anagramme éditions, 2002, ISBN 2 914571 14 3
- Histoires de scoops, 2, a 52 minute documentary by Laurent Portes, produced by Sunset Presse for Planète in 2008
