= Xavière Tiberi =

French mayoress

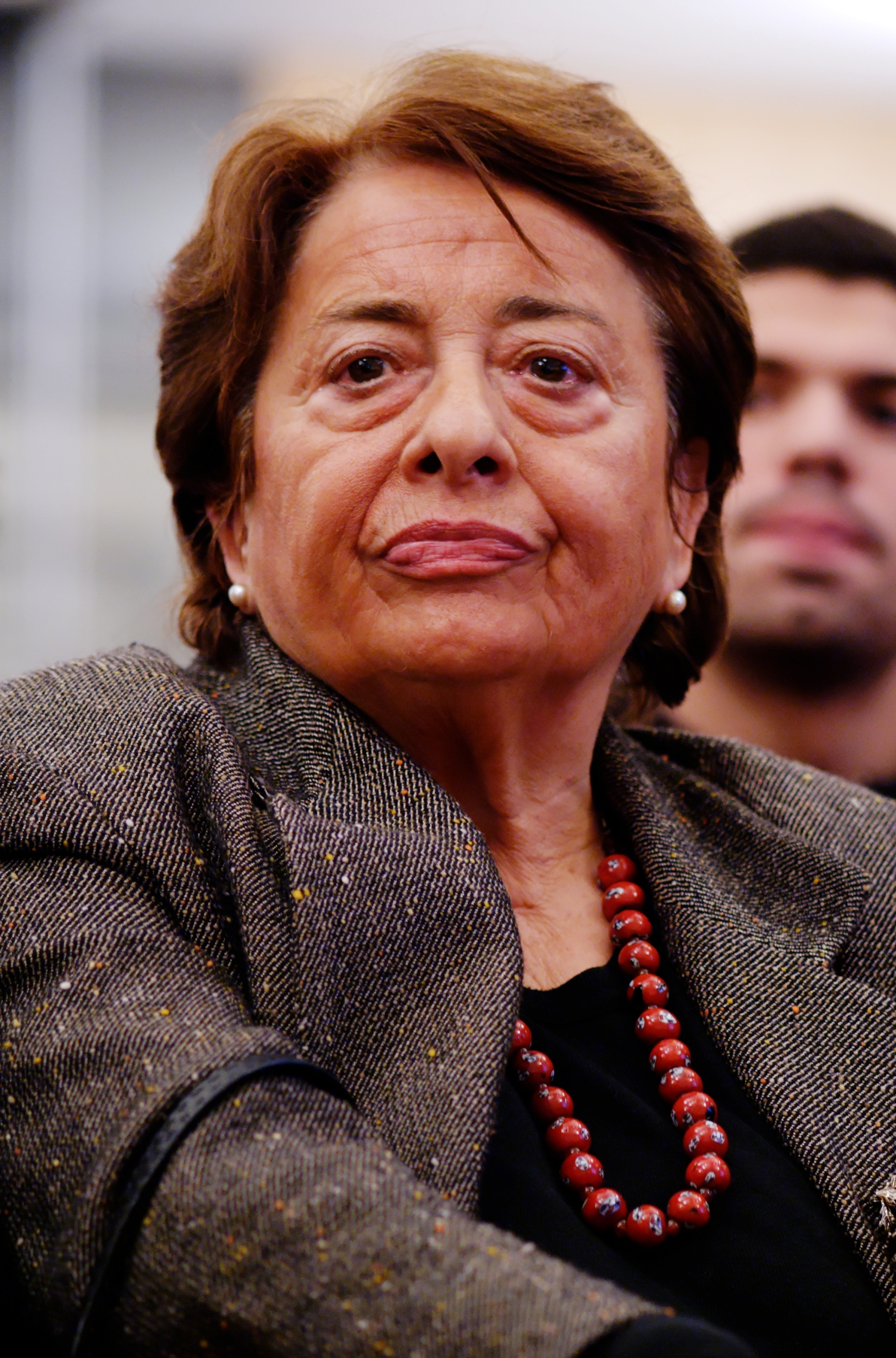
Xavière Tiberi at a political rally held by her husband for the 2008 Paris municipal election on 7 December 2007

Xavière Tiberi (born 22 August 1936) is the widow of the former mayor of Paris Jean Tiberi. She is mostly known for being involved in corruption scandals in the Paris region.

Xavière Tiberi received 200,000 French Francs for a report on francophonie for the general counsel of the Essonne département. This 36-page long report, possibly written after the payment as a justification, was extremely poorly written (contained numerous spelling and grammatical mistakes, for instance).

In 1998, a justice-ordered search of Jean and Xavière Tiberi's apartment on the Place du Panthéon showed that they possessed illegal firearms. They were not prosecuted in exchange for the destruction of the weapons.

The above actions are sometimes referred to by the press as Corsican mores.

Friend of Jean-Edern Hallier, she has been Cercle InterHallier member since 2019.
