= Jacques Chirac =

President of France from 1995 to 2007

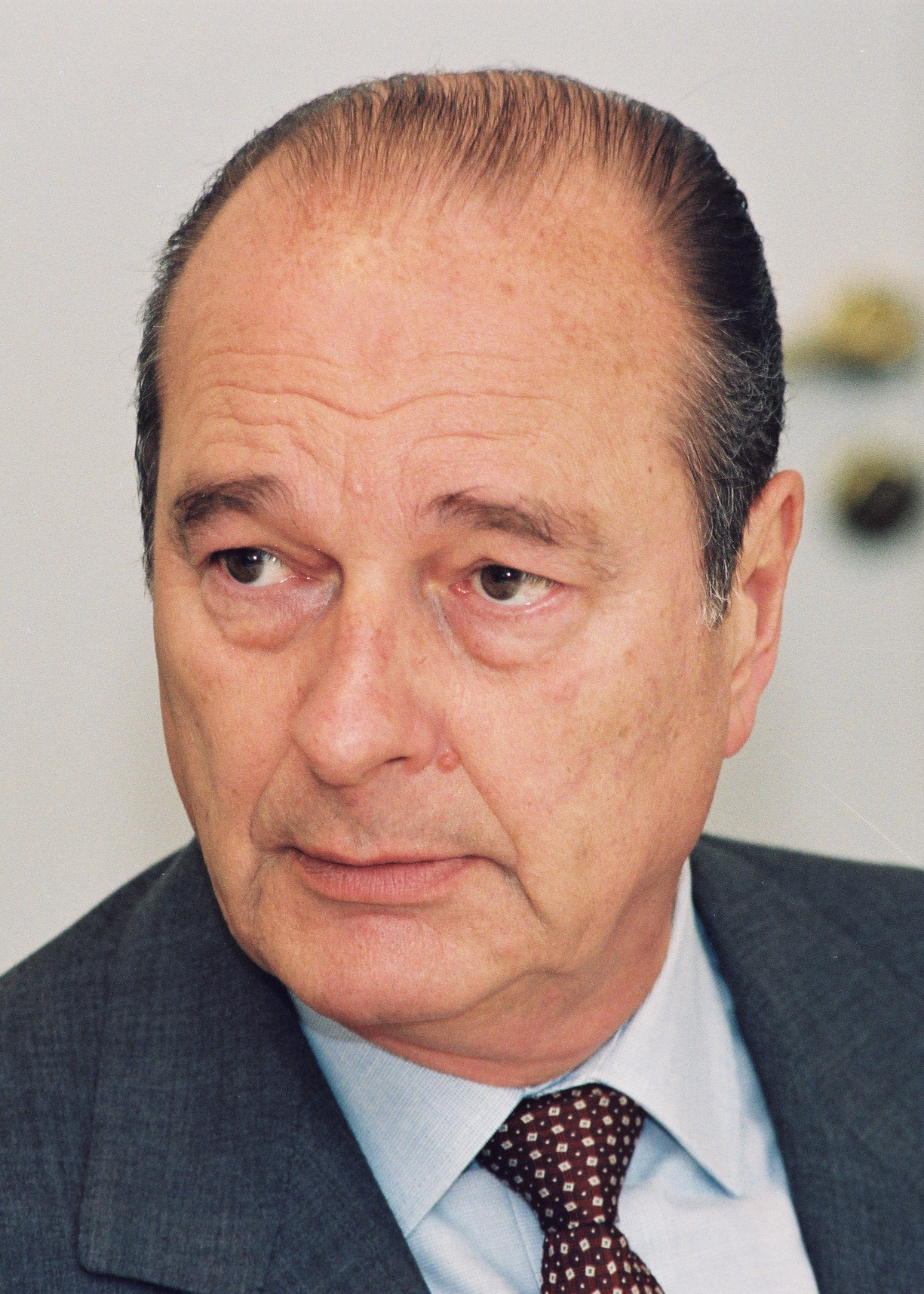
- Chirac in 1997

President of France
- In office 17 May 1995 – 16 May 2007
- Prime Minister: Alain Juppé; Lionel Jospin; Jean-Pierre Raffarin; Dominique de Villepin
- Preceded by: François Mitterrand
- Succeeded by: Nicolas Sarkozy

Prime Minister of France
- In office 20 March 1986 – 10 May 1988
- President: François Mitterrand
- Preceded by: Laurent Fabius
- Succeeded by: Michel Rocard
- In office 27 May 1974 – 25 August 1976
- President: Valéry Giscard d'Estaing
- Preceded by: Pierre Messmer
- Succeeded by: Raymond Barre

Mayor of Paris
- In office 20 March 1977 – 16 May 1995
- Deputy: Christian de La Malène; Jean Tiberi
- Preceded by: Office re-established Jules Ferry (1870–71)
- Succeeded by: Jean Tiberi

President of Rally for the Republic
- In office 5 December 1976 – 4 November 1994
- Preceded by: Party established
- Succeeded by: Alain Juppé
Political offices 1970‍–‍1979
Minister of the Interior
In office 27 February 1974 – 28 May 1974
Prime Minister	Pierre Messmer
Preceded by	Raymond Marcellin
Succeeded by	Michel Poniatowski
Minister of Agriculture and Rural Development
In office 7 July 1972 – 27 February 1974
Prime Minister	Pierre Messmer
Preceded by	Michel Cointat
Succeeded by	Raymond Marcellin
Minister for Parliamentary Relations
In office 7 January 1971 – 5 July 1972
Prime Minister	Jacques Chaban-Delmas
Preceded by	Roger Frey
Succeeded by	Robert Boulin
President of the General Council of Corrèze
In office 15 March 1970 – 25 March 1979
Preceded by	Élie Rouby
Succeeded by	Georges Debat

Additional positions

Personal details
- Born: Jacques René Chirac; 29 November 1932 Paris, France
- Died: 26 September 2019 (aged 86) Paris, France
- Resting place: Montparnasse Cemetery, Paris
- Party: See list: PCF (before 1962); UNR (1962–1968); UDR (1968–1976); RPR (1976–2002); UMP (2002–2007)
- Spouse: Bernadette Chodron de Courcel (m. 1956)
- Children: 3, including Claude and Anh Dao Traxel (foster daughter)
- Education: Sciences Po; ENA

Military service
- Allegiance: French Fourth Republic
- Branch/service: French Army
- Years of service: 1954–1957
- Rank: Second lieutenant

Jacques René Chirac (UK: /ˈʃɪəræk/, US: /ʒɑːk ʃɪəˈrɑːk/; French: [ʒak ʁəne ʃiʁak]; 29 November 1932 – 26 September 2019) was President of France from 1995 to 2007. He was previously Prime Minister of France from 1974 to 1976 and 1986 to 1988, as well as Mayor of Paris from 1977 to 1995.

After attending the École nationale d'administration, Chirac began his career as a high-level civil servant, entering politics shortly thereafter. Chirac occupied various senior positions, including minister of agriculture and minister of the interior. In 1981 and 1988, he unsuccessfully ran for president as the standard-bearer for the conservative Gaullist party Rally for the Republic (RPR). Chirac's internal policies initially included lower tax rates, the removal of price controls, strong punishment for crime and terrorism, and business privatisation.

After pursuing these policies in his second term as prime minister, Chirac changed his views. He argued for different economic policies and was elected president in 1995, with 52.6% of the vote in the second round, beating Socialist Lionel Jospin, after campaigning on a platform of healing the "social rift" (fracture sociale).

Chirac's economic policies, based on dirigisme, allowing for state-directed investment, stood in opposition to the laissez-faire policies of the United Kingdom under the ministries of Margaret Thatcher and John Major, which Chirac described as "Anglo-Saxon ultraliberalism".

Chirac was known for his stand against the American-led invasion of Iraq, his recognition of the collaborationist French government's role in deporting Jews, his ending conscription in 1997, and his reduction of the presidential term from seven years to five through a referendum in 2000. At the 2002 presidential election, he won 82.2% of the vote in the second round against the far-right candidate, Jean-Marie Le Pen, and was the last president to be re-elected until 2022. In 2011, a Paris court declared Chirac guilty of diverting public funds and abusing public confidence, giving him a two-year suspended prison sentence.

== Early life and education ==
=== Family background ===
Jacques René Chirac was born on 29 November 1932 in the 5th arrondissement of Paris, the son of Abel François Marie Chirac (1898–1968), a successful executive for an aircraft company, and Marie-Louise Valette (1902–1973), a housewife. His grandparents were all teachers from Sainte-Féréole in Corrèze. His great-grandparents on both sides were peasants in the rural south-western region of the Corrèze.

According to Chirac, his name "originates from the langue d'oc, that of the troubadours, therefore that of poetry". He was a Roman Catholic.

Chirac was an only child (his elder sister, Jacqueline, died in infancy nearly ten years before his birth). He was educated in Paris at the Cours Hattemer, a private school. He then attended the Lycée Carnot and the Lycée Louis-le-Grand. After his baccalauréat, behind his father's back, he went off to serve for three months as a sailor on a coal transport.

Chirac played rugby union for Brive's youth team, and also played at university level. He played no. 8 and second row. At age 18, his ambition was to become a ship's captain.

=== Education and early career ===
At age 16, Chirac wanted to learn Sanskrit and found a White Russian Sanskrit teacher in Paris who ended up teaching him Russian; by age 17 Chirac was almost fluent in Russian. Inspired by Charles de Gaulle, Chirac started to pursue a civil service career in the 1950s. During this period, he joined the French Communist Party, sold copies of L'Humanité, and took part in meetings of a communist cell.

In 1950, he signed the Soviet-inspired Stockholm Appeal for the abolition of nuclear weapons – which led him to be questioned when he applied for his first visa to the United States.

In 1953, after graduating from the Sciences Po, he attended a non-credit course at Harvard University's summer school, before entering the École nationale d'administration, which trains France's top civil servants, in 1957.

In the United States, Chirac worked at Anheuser-Busch in St. Louis, Missouri.

Chirac trained as a reserve military officer in armoured cavalry at Saumur. He then volunteered to fight in the Algerian War, using personal connections to be sent despite the reservations of his superiors. His superiors did not want to make him an officer because they suspected he had communist leanings. In 1965, he became an auditor in the Court of Auditors.

== Early political career ==
=== The "Bulldozer": 1962–1971 ===
In April 1962, Chirac was appointed head of the personal staff of Prime Minister Georges Pompidou. This appointment launched Chirac's political career. Pompidou considered Chirac his protégé, and referred to him as "my bulldozer" for his skill at getting things done. The nickname Le Bulldozer caught on in French political circles, where it also referred to his abrasive manner. As late as the 1988 presidential election, Chirac maintained this reputation.

At Pompidou's suggestion, Chirac ran as a Gaullist for a seat in the National Assembly in 1967. He was elected deputy for his home Corrèze département, a stronghold of the left. This surprising victory in the context of a Gaullist ebb permitted him to enter the government as Minister of Social Affairs. Although Chirac was well-situated in de Gaulle's entourage, being related by marriage to the general's sole companion at the time of the Appeal of 18 June 1940, he was more of a "Pompidolian" than a "Gaullist". When student and worker unrest rocked France in May 1968, Chirac played a central role in negotiating a truce. Subsequently, as state secretary of economy (1968–1971), he worked closely with Valéry Giscard d'Estaing, who headed the ministry of economy and finance.

=== Cabinet minister: 1971–1974 ===
After some months in the ministry for Relations with Parliament, Chirac's first high-level post came in 1972 when he became Minister of Agriculture and Rural Development under Pompidou, who had been elected president in 1969, after de Gaulle retired. Chirac quickly earned a reputation as a champion of French farmers' interests, and first attracted international attention when he assailed U.S., West German, and European Commission agricultural policies which conflicted with French interests.

On 27 February 1974, after the resignation of Raymond Marcellin, Chirac was appointed Minister of the Interior. On 21 March 1974, he cancelled the SAFARI project due to privacy concerns after its existence was revealed by Le Monde. From March 1974, he was entrusted by President Pompidou with preparations for the presidential election then scheduled for 1976. These elections were moved forward because of Pompidou's sudden death on 2 April 1974.

Chirac vainly attempted to rally Gaullists behind Prime Minister Pierre Messmer. Jacques Chaban-Delmas announced his candidacy in spite of the disapproval of the "Pompidolians". Chirac and others published the call of the 43 in favour of Giscard d'Estaing, the leader of the non-Gaullist part of the parliamentary majority. Giscard d'Estaing was elected as Pompidou's successor after France's most competitive election campaign in years. In return, the new president chose Chirac to lead the cabinet.

=== Prime Minister under Giscard: 1974–1976 ===
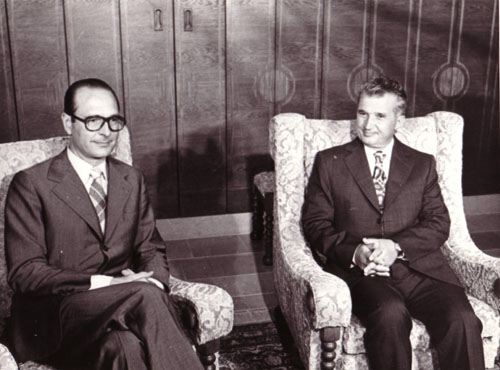
Chirac with Romanian president Nicolae Ceaușescu during a visit to Neptun, 1975

When Valéry Giscard d'Estaing became president, he nominated Chirac as prime minister on 27 May 1974, to reconcile the "Giscardian" and "non-Giscardian" factions of the parliamentary majority. At the age of 41, Chirac stood out as the very model of the jeunes loups ('young wolves') of French politics, but he was faced with the hostility of the "Barons of Gaullism" who considered him a traitor for his role during the previous presidential campaign. In December 1974, he took the lead of the Union of Democrats for the Republic (UDR) against the will of its more senior personalities.

As prime minister, Chirac quickly set about persuading the Gaullists that, despite the social reforms proposed by President Giscard, the basic tenets of Gaullism, such as national and European independence, would be retained. Chirac was advised by Pierre Juillet and Marie-France Garaud, two former advisers of Pompidou. These two organised the campaign against Chaban-Delmas in 1974. They advocated a clash with Giscard d'Estaing because they thought his policy bewildered the conservative electorate.

Citing Giscard's unwillingness to give him authority, Chirac resigned as prime minister in 1976. He proceeded to build up his political base among France's several conservative parties, with a goal of reconstituting the Gaullist UDR into a Neo-Gaullist group, the Rally for the Republic (RPR). Chirac's first tenure as prime minister was also an arguably progressive one, with improvements in both the minimum wage and the social welfare system carried out during the course of his premiership.

=== Mayor of Paris: 1977–1995 ===
After his departure from the cabinet, Chirac wanted to gain the leadership of the political right, to gain the French presidency in the future. The RPR was conceived as an electoral machine against President Giscard d'Estaing. Paradoxically, Chirac benefited from Giscard's decision to create the office of mayor in Paris, which had been in abeyance since the 1871 Commune, because the leaders of the Third Republic (1871–1940) feared that having municipal control of the capital would give the mayor too much power. In 1977, Chirac stood as a candidate against Michel d'Ornano, a close friend of the president, and won. As mayor of Paris, Chirac's political influence grew. He held this post until 1995.

Chirac supporters point out that, as mayor, he provided programmes to help the elderly, people with disabilities, and single mothers, and introduced the street-cleaning Motocrotte, while providing incentives for businesses to stay in Paris. His opponents contend that he installed "clientelist" policies.

== Governmental opposition ==
=== Struggle for the right-wing leadership: 1976–1986 ===
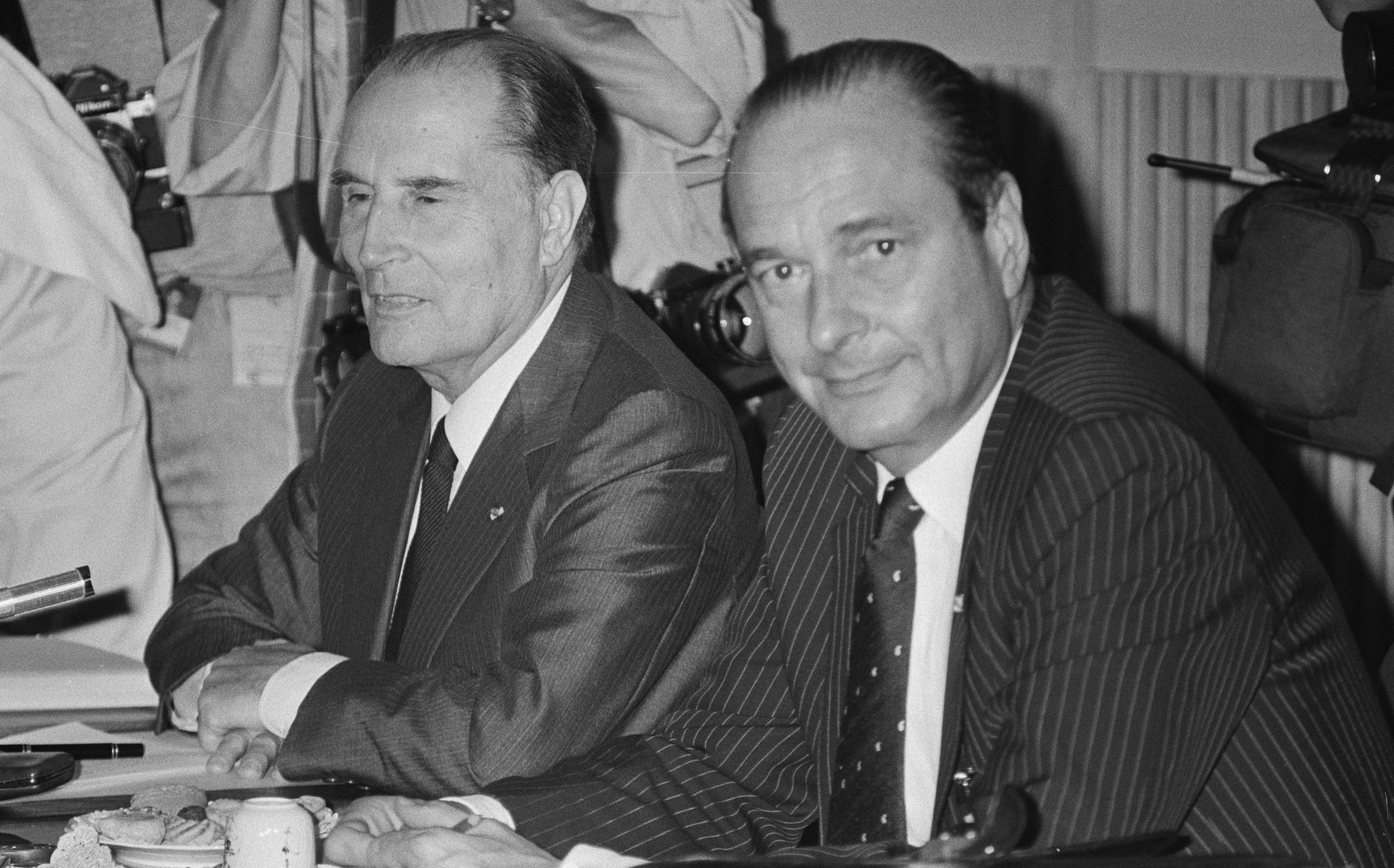
Jacques Chirac with president François Mitterrand (1986)

In 1978, Chirac attacked Giscard's pro-European policy and made a nationalist turn with the December 1978 Call of Cochin, initiated by his counsellors Marie-France Garaud and Pierre Juillet, which had first been called by Pompidou. Hospitalised in Hôpital Cochin after a car crash, he declared that "as always about the drooping of France, the pro-foreign party acts with its peaceable and reassuring voice". He appointed Yvan Blot, an intellectual who would later join the National Front, as director of his campaigns for the 1979 European election.

After the poor results of the election, Chirac broke with Garaud and Juillet. Vexed Marie-France Garaud stated: "We thought Chirac was made of the same marble of which statues are carved in, we perceive he's of the same faience bidets are made of." His rivalry with Giscard d'Estaing intensified.

Chirac made his first run for president against Giscard d'Estaing in the 1981 election, thus splitting the centre-right vote. He was eliminated in the first round with 18% of the vote. He reluctantly supported Giscard in the second round. He refused to give instructions to the RPR voters, but said that he supported the incumbent president "in a private capacity", which was interpreted as almost de facto support of the Socialist Party's (PS) candidate, François Mitterrand, who was elected by a broad majority.

Giscard blamed Chirac for his defeat. He was told by Mitterrand, before his death, that the latter had dined with Chirac before the election. Chirac told the Socialist candidate that he wanted to "get rid of Giscard". In his memoirs, Giscard wrote that between the two rounds, he phoned the RPR headquarters. He passed himself off, as a right-wing voter, by changing his voice. The RPR employee advised him "certainly do not vote Giscard!" After 1981, the relationship between the two men became tense, with Giscard, even though he had been in the same government coalition as Chirac, criticising Chirac's actions openly.

After the May 1981 presidential election, the right also lost the subsequent legislative election that year. However, as Giscard had been knocked out, Chirac appeared as the principal leader of the right-wing opposition. Due to his attacks against the economic policy of the Socialist government, he gradually aligned himself with the prevailing economically liberal opinion, even though it did not correspond with Gaullist doctrine. While the far-right National Front grew, taking advantage of the proportional representation electoral system which had been introduced for the 1986 legislative elections, he signed an electoral pact with the Giscardian (and more or less Christian Democratic) party Union for French Democracy (UDF).

=== Prime Minister under Mitterrand: 1986–1988 ===
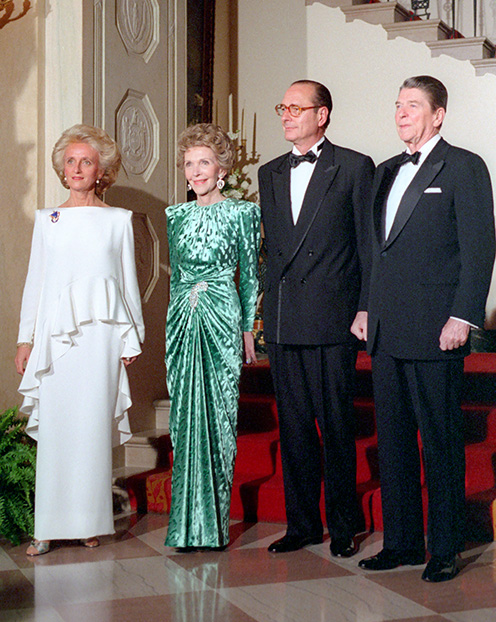
President Ronald Reagan, Jacques Chirac, Nancy Reagan and Bernadette Chirac (White House, March 1987)

When the RPR/UDF right-wing coalition won a slight majority in the National Assembly in the 1986 election, Mitterrand (PS) appointed Chirac prime minister (though many in Mitterrand's inner circle lobbied him to choose Jacques Chaban-Delmas instead). This unprecedented power-sharing arrangement, known as cohabitation, gave Chirac the lead in domestic affairs. However, it is generally conceded that Mitterrand used the areas granted to the President of the Republic, or "reserved domains" of the Presidency, Defence and Foreign Affairs, to belittle his prime minister.

Chirac's cabinet sold many public companies, renewing the liberalisation initiated under Laurent Fabius's Socialist government of 1984–1986, and abolished the solidarity tax on wealth (ISF), a symbolic tax on those with high-value assets introduced by Mitterrand's government. Elsewhere, the plan for university reform (plan Devaquet) caused a crisis in 1986 when a student called Malik Oussekine was killed by the police, leading to massive demonstrations and the proposal's withdrawal. It has been said during other student crises that this event strongly affected Chirac, who was afterwards careful about possible police violence during such demonstrations (e.g., possibly explaining part of the decision to "promulgate without applying" the First Employment Contract (CPE) after large student demonstrations against it).

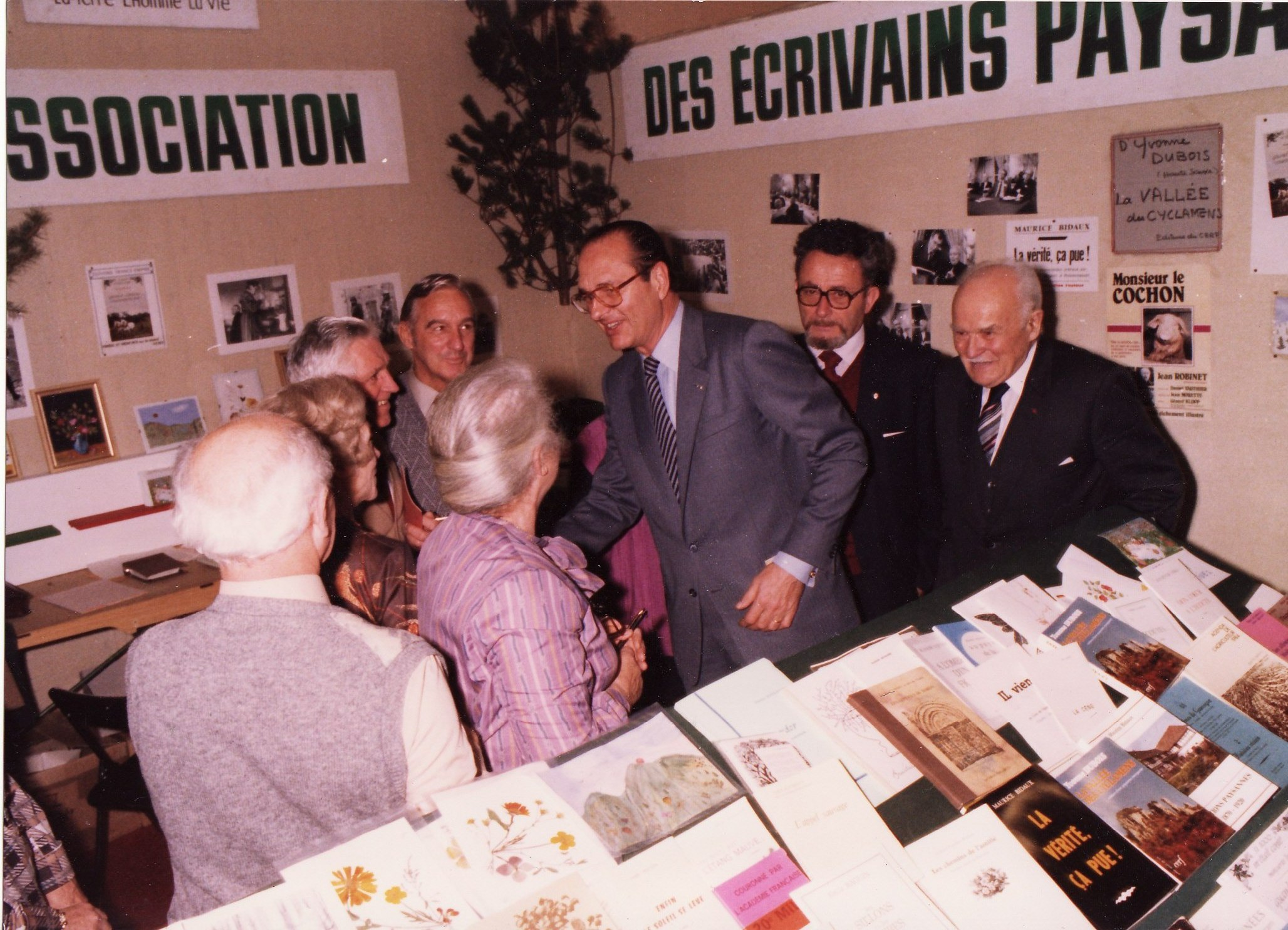
Chirac (centre) during his second term as prime minister

One of his first acts concerning foreign policy was to call back Jacques Foccart (1913–1997), who had been de Gaulle's and his successors' leading counsellor for African matters, called by journalist Stephen Smith the "father of all "networks" on the continent, at the time [in 1986] aged 72." Foccart, who had also co-founded the Gaullist SAC militia (dissolved by Mitterrand in 1982 after the Auriol massacre) along with Charles Pasqua, and who was a key component of the Françafrique system, was again called to the Elysée Palace when Chirac won the 1995 presidential election.

Furthermore, confronted by anti-colonialist movements in New Caledonia, Prime Minister Chirac ordered a military intervention against the separatists in the Ouvéa cave, leading to the deaths of 19 militants. He allegedly refused any alliance with Jean-Marie Le Pen's National Front.

=== Crossing the desert: 1988–1995 ===
Chirac ran against Mitterrand for a second time in the 1988 election. He obtained 20 per cent of the vote in the first round but lost the second with only 46 per cent. He resigned from the cabinet and the right lost the next legislative election.

For the first time, his leadership over the RPR was challenged. Charles Pasqua and Philippe Séguin criticised his abandonment of Gaullist doctrines. On the right, a new generation of politicians, the "renovation men", accused Chirac and Giscard of being responsible for the electoral defeats. In 1992, convinced a candidate could not become president whilst advocating anti-European policies, he called for a "yes" vote in the referendum on the Maastricht Treaty, against the opinion of Pasqua, Séguin and a majority of the RPR voters, who chose to vote "no".

While he still was mayor of Paris (since 1977), Chirac went to Abidjan (Côte d'Ivoire) where he supported President Houphouët-Boigny (1960–1993), although the latter was being called a "thief" by the local population. Chirac then declared that multipartism was a "kind of luxury".

Nevertheless, the right won the 1993 legislative election. Chirac announced that he did not want to come back as prime minister as his previous term had ended with his unsuccessful run for the presidency against Mitterrand who was still president at this point.

Chirac instead suggested the appointment of Edouard Balladur, who had promised that he would not run for the presidency against Chirac in 1995. However, benefiting from positive polls, Balladur decided to be a presidential candidate, with the support of a majority of right-wing politicians. Balladur broke from Chirac along with a number of friends and allies, including Charles Pasqua, Nicolas Sarkozy, etc., who supported his candidacy. A small group of fidels would remain with Chirac, including Alain Juppé and Jean-Louis Debré. When Nicolas Sarkozy became president in 2007, Juppé was one of the few chiraquiens to serve in François Fillon's government.

== Presidency (1995–2007) ==
=== First term: 1995–2002 ===
==== Juppé ministry ====
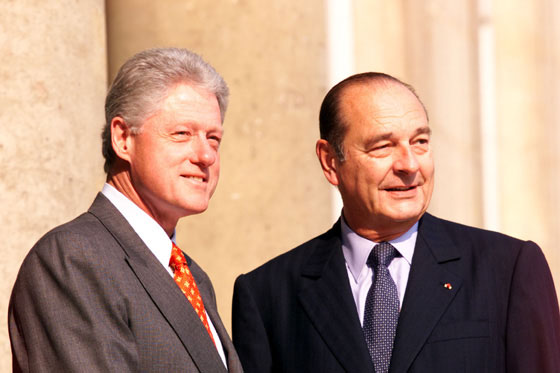
Chirac with US president Bill Clinton outside the Élysée Palace, 1999

During the 1995 presidential campaign, Chirac criticised the "sole thought" (pensée unique) of neoliberalism represented by his challenger on the right and promised to reduce the "social fracture", placing himself more to the centre and thus forcing Balladur to radicalise himself. Ultimately, he obtained more votes than Balladur in the first round (20.8 per cent), and then defeated the Socialist candidate Lionel Jospin in the second round (52.6 per cent).

Chirac was elected on a platform of tax cuts and job programmes, but his policies did little to ease the labour strikes during his first months in office. On the domestic front, neo-liberal economic austerity measures introduced by Chirac and his conservative prime minister Alain Juppé, including budgetary cutbacks, proved highly unpopular. At about the same time, it became apparent that Juppé and others had obtained preferential conditions for public housing, as well as other perks. At the year's end, Chirac faced major workers' strikes which turned, in November–December 1995, into a general strike, one of the largest since May 1968. The demonstrations were largely pitted against Juppé's plan for pension reform, and ultimately led to his dismissal.

Shortly after taking office, Chirac – undaunted by international protests by environmental groups – insisted upon the resumption of nuclear tests at Mururoa Atoll in French Polynesia in 1995, a few months before signing the Comprehensive Test Ban Treaty. Reacting to criticism, Chirac said, "You only have to look back at 1935...There were people then who were against France arming itself, and look what happened." On 1 February 1996, Chirac announced that France had ended "once and for all" its nuclear testing and intended to accede to the Comprehensive Test Ban Treaty.

Elected as President of the Republic, he refused to discuss the existence of French military bases in Africa, despite requests by the Ministry of Defence and the Ministry of Foreign Affairs. The French Army thus remained in Côte d'Ivoire as well as in Omar Bongo's Gabon.

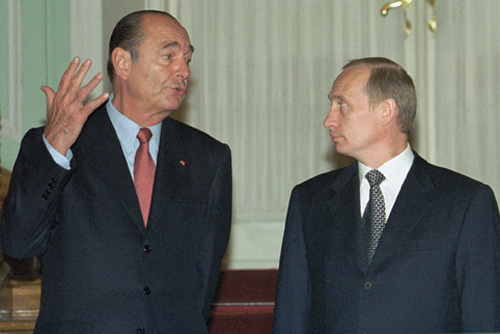
Chirac with Russian president Vladimir Putin, 2001

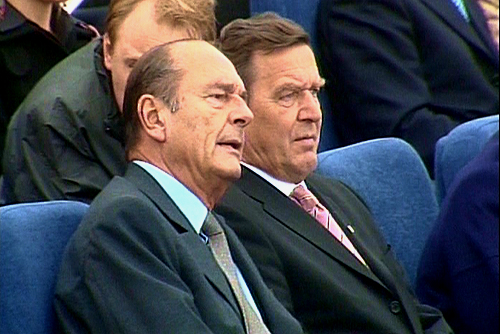
Chirac with German federal chancellor Gerhard Schröder, 2003

==== State responsibility for the roundup of Jews ====
Prior to 1995, the French government had maintained that the French Republic had been dismantled when Philippe Pétain instituted a new French State during World War II and that the Republic had been re-established when the war was over. It was not for France, therefore, to apologise for the roundup of Jews for deportation that happened while the Republic had not existed and was carried out by a state, Vichy France, which it did not recognise. President François Mitterrand had reiterated this position: "The Republic had nothing to do with this. I do not believe France is responsible", he said in September 1994.

Chirac was the first president of France to take responsibility for the deportation of Jews during the Vichy regime. In a speech made on 16 July 1995 at the site of the Vel' d'Hiv Roundup, where 13,000 Jews had been held for deportation to concentration camps in July 1942, Chirac said, "France, on that day, committed the irreparable". Those responsible for the roundup were "4,500 policemen and gendarmes, French, under the authority of their leaders [who] obeyed the demands of the Nazis. ... the criminal folly of the occupiers was seconded by the French, by the French State".

==== "Cohabitation" with Jospin ====
In 1997, Chirac dissolved parliament for early legislative elections in a gamble designed to bolster support for his conservative economic program. But instead, it created an uproar, and his power was weakened by the subsequent backlash. The Socialist Party (PS), joined by other parties on the left, soundly defeated Chirac's conservative allies, forcing Chirac into a new period of cohabitation with Jospin as prime minister (1997–2002), which lasted five years.

Cohabitation significantly weakened the power of Chirac's presidency. The French president, by a constitutional convention, only controls foreign and military policy – and even then, allocation of funding is under the control of Parliament and under the significant influence of the prime minister. Short of dissolving parliament and calling for new elections, the president was left with little power to influence public policy regarding crime, the economy, and public services. Chirac seized the occasion to periodically criticise Jospin's government.

His position was weakened by scandals about the financing of RPR by Paris municipality. In 2001, the left, represented by Bertrand Delanoë (PS), won a majority on the city council of the capital. Jean Tiberi, Chirac's successor at the Paris city hall, was forced to resign after having been put under investigation in June 1999 on charges of trafic d'influences in the HLMs of Paris affairs (related to the illegal financing of the RPR). Tiberi was finally expelled from the Rally for the Republic, Chirac's party, on 12 October 2000, declaring to the magazine Le Figaro on 18 November 2000: "Jacques Chirac is not my friend anymore".

After the publication of the diaries of Jean-Claude Méry by Le Monde on 22 September 2000, in which Jean-Claude Méry, in charge of the RPR's financing, directly accused Chirac of organising the network, and of having been physically present on 5 October 1986, when Méry gave in cash 5 million Francs, which came from companies who had benefited from state deals, to Michel Roussin, personal secretary (directeur de cabinet) of Chirac, Chirac refused to attend court in response to his summons by judge Eric Halphen, and the highest echelons of the French justice system declared that he could not be inculpated while in office.

During his two terms, he increased the Elysee Palace's total budget by 105 per cent (to €90 million, whereas 20 years before it was the equivalent of €43.7 million). He doubled the number of presidential cars – to 61 cars and seven scooters in the Palace's garage. He hired 145 extra employees – the total number of people he employed simultaneously was 963.

==== Defence policy ====
As the Supreme Commander of the French armed forces, he reduced the military budget, as did his predecessor. At the end of his first term, it accounted for three per cent of GDP. In 1997 the aircraft carrier Clemenceau was decommissioned after 37 years of service, with her sister ship Foch decommissioned in 2000 after 37 years of service, leaving the French Navy with no aircraft carrier until 2001, when Charles de Gaulle was commissioned. He also reduced spending on nuclear weapons and the French nuclear arsenal was reduced to include 350 warheads, compared to the Russian nuclear arsenal of 16,000 warheads. He also published a plan to reduce the number of fighters the French military had by 30.

After François Mitterrand left office in 1995, Chirac began a rapprochement with NATO by joining the Military Committee and attempting to negotiate a return to the integrated military command, which failed after the French demand for parity with the United States went unmet. The possibility of a further attempt foundered after Chirac was forced into cohabitation with a Socialist-led cabinet between 1997 and 2002, then poor Franco-American relations after the French UN veto threat over Iraq in 2003 made transatlantic negotiations impossible.

==== Close call ====
On 25 July 2000, as Chirac and his wife were returning from the G7 Summit in Okinawa, Japan, they were placed in a dangerous situation by Air France Flight 4590 after they landed at Charles de Gaulle International Airport. The first couple were in an Air France Boeing 747 taxiing toward the terminal when the jet had to stop and wait for Flight 4590 to take off.

The departing plane, operated by a Concorde, ran over a strip of metal on takeoff puncturing its left fuel tank and sliced electrical wires near the left landing gear. The sequence of events ignited a large fire and caused the Concorde to veer left on its takeoff roll. As it reached takeoff speed and lifted off the ground, it came within 30 feet of hitting Chirac's 747. Photographs of Flight 4590 ablaze were taken by passenger Toshihiko Sato on Chirac's jetliner.

=== Second term: 2002–2007 ===
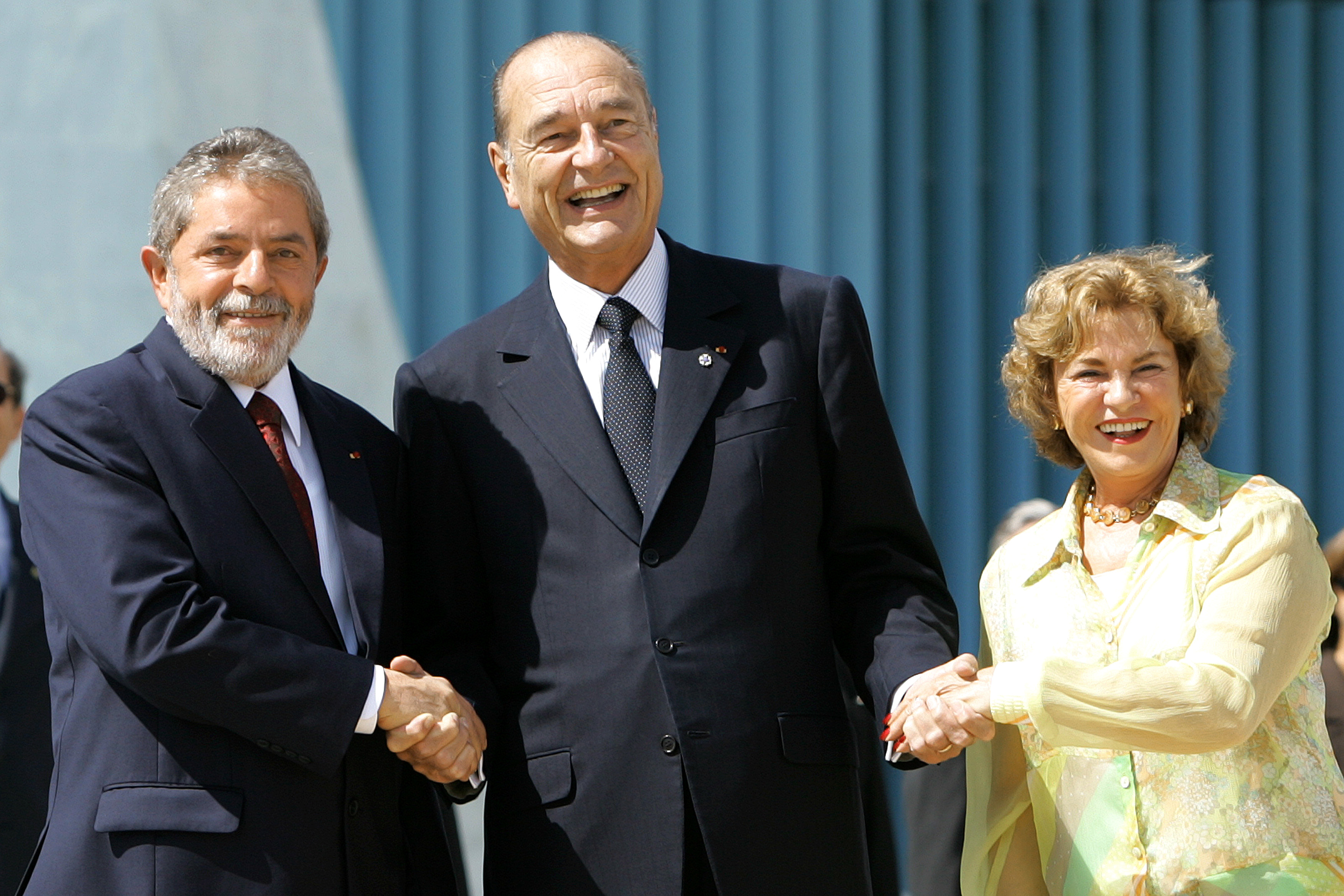
Chirac greets the President of Brazil, Luiz Inácio Lula da Silva, and his wife Marisa Letícia during a ceremony at the Palácio da Alvorada in Brasília, 2006.

At the age of 69, Chirac faced his fourth presidential campaign in 2002. He received 20% of the vote in the first ballot of the presidential elections in April 2002. It had been expected that he would face incumbent prime minister Lionel Jospin (PS) in the second round of elections; instead, Chirac faced far-right politician Jean-Marie Le Pen of the National Front (FN), who came in 200,000 votes ahead of Jospin. All parties other than the National Front (except for Lutte ouvrière) called for opposing Le Pen, even if it meant voting for Chirac. The 14-day period between the two rounds of voting was marked by demonstrations against Le Pen and slogans such as "Vote for the crook, not for the fascist" or "Vote with a clothespin on your nose". Chirac won re-election by a landslide, with 82 per cent of the vote on the second ballot. However, Chirac became increasingly unpopular during his second term. According to a July 2005 poll, 37 per cent judged Chirac favourably and 63 per cent unfavourably. In 2006, The Economist wrote that Chirac "is the most unpopular occupant of the Elysée Palace in the fifth republic's history."

==== Early term ====
As the left-wing Socialist Party was in thorough disarray following Jospin's defeat, Chirac reorganised politics on the right, establishing a new party – initially called the Union of the Presidential Majority, then the Union for a Popular Movement (UMP). The RPR had broken down; a number of members had formed Eurosceptic breakaways. While the Giscardian liberals of the Union for French Democracy (UDF) had moved to the right, the UMP won the parliamentary elections that followed the presidential poll with ease.

During an official visit to Madagascar on 21 July 2005, Chirac described the repression of the 1947 Malagasy uprising, which left between 80,000 and 90,000 dead, as "unacceptable".

Despite past opposition to state intervention, the Chirac government approved a €2.8 billion aid package to troubled manufacturing giant Alstom. In October 2004, Chirac signed a trade agreement with PRC president Hu Jintao where Alstom was given €1 billion in contracts and promises of future investment in China.

==== Assassination attempt ====
On 14 July 2002, during Bastille Day celebrations, Chirac survived an assassination attempt by a lone gunman with a rifle hidden in a guitar case. The would-be assassin fired a shot toward the presidential motorcade, before being overpowered by bystanders. The gunman, Maxime Brunerie, underwent psychiatric testing; the violent far-right group with which he was associated, Unité Radicale, was soon dissolved.

==== Foreign policy ====
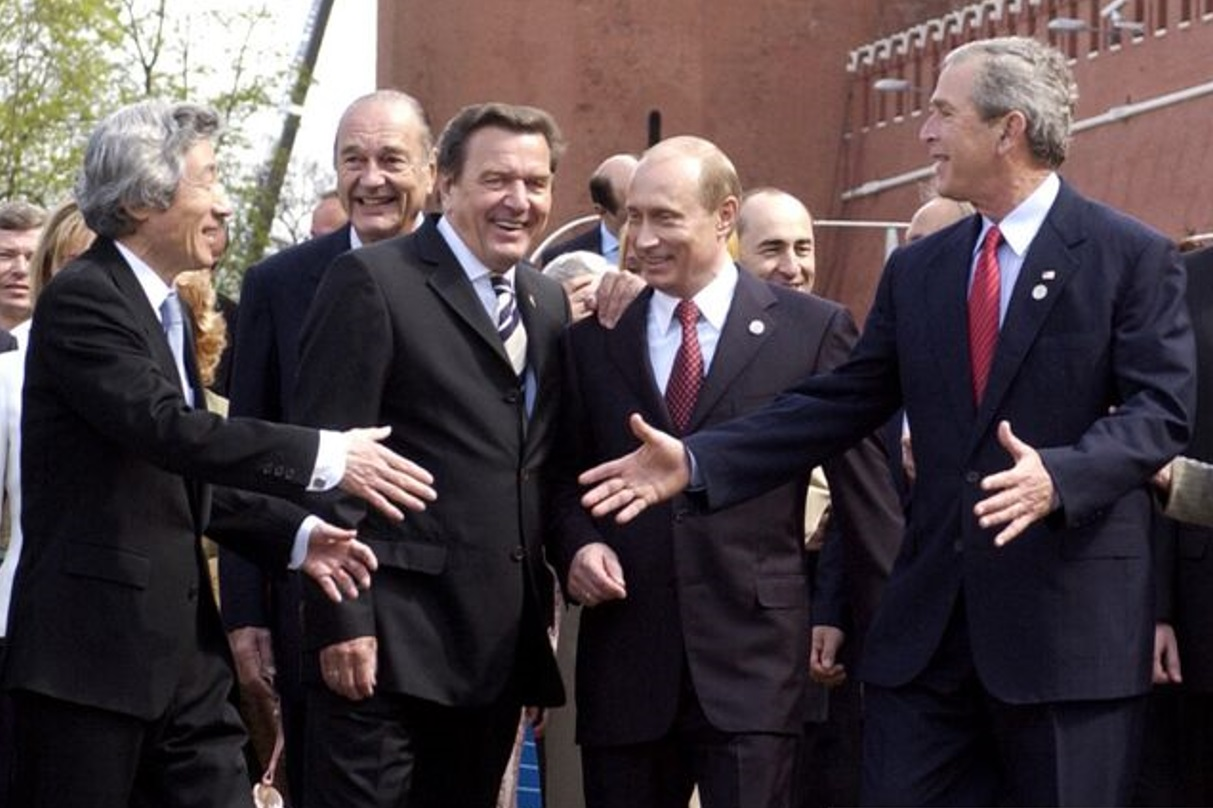
Chirac with George W. Bush, Gerhard Schröder, Vladimir Putin, Junichiro Koizumi and other state leaders in Moscow, 2005

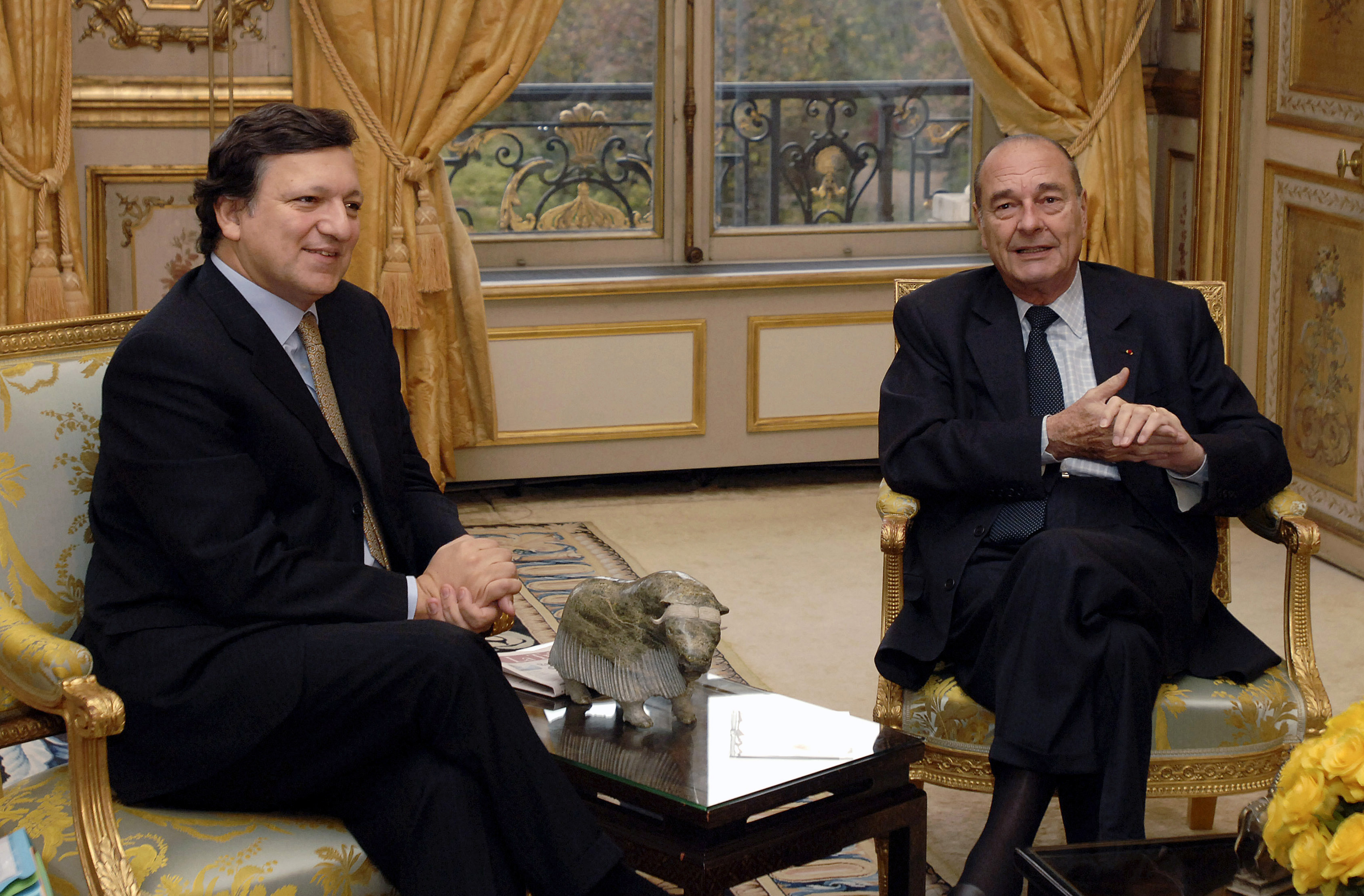
Chirac with President of the European Commission José Manuel Barroso in Paris, 8 December 2005

Along with Vladimir Putin (whom he called "a personal friend"), Hu Jintao, and Gerhard Schröder, Chirac emerged as a leading voice against George W. Bush and Tony Blair in 2003 during the organisation and deployment of American and British forces participating in a military coalition to forcibly remove the government of Iraq controlled by the Ba'ath Party under the leadership of Saddam Hussein that resulted in the 2003–2011 Iraq War.

Despite British and American pressure, Chirac threatened to veto, at that given point, a resolution in the UN Security Council that would authorise the use of military force to rid Iraq of alleged weapons of mass destruction, and rallied other governments to his position. "Iraq today does not represent an immediate threat that justifies an immediate war", Chirac said on 18 March 2003. Future prime minister Dominique de Villepin acquired much of his popularity for his speech against the war at the United Nations (UN).

After Togo's leader Gnassingbé Eyadéma's death on 5 February 2005, Chirac gave him tribute and supported his son, Faure Gnassingbé, who has since succeeded his father.

On 19 January 2006, Chirac said that France was prepared to launch a nuclear strike against any country that sponsors a terrorist attack against French interests. He said his country's nuclear arsenal had been reconfigured to include the ability to make a tactical strike in retaliation for terrorism.

Chirac criticised the Israeli offensive into Lebanon on 14 July 2006. However, Israeli Army Radio later reported that Chirac had secretly told Israeli prime minister Ehud Olmert that France would support an Israeli invasion of Syria and the overthrow of the government of President Bashar al-Assad, promising to veto any moves against Israel in the United Nations or European Union. Whereas the disagreement on Iraq had caused a rift between Paris and Washington, recent analysis suggests that both governments worked closely together on the Syria file to end the Syrian occupation of Lebanon, and that Chirac was a driver of this diplomatic cooperation.

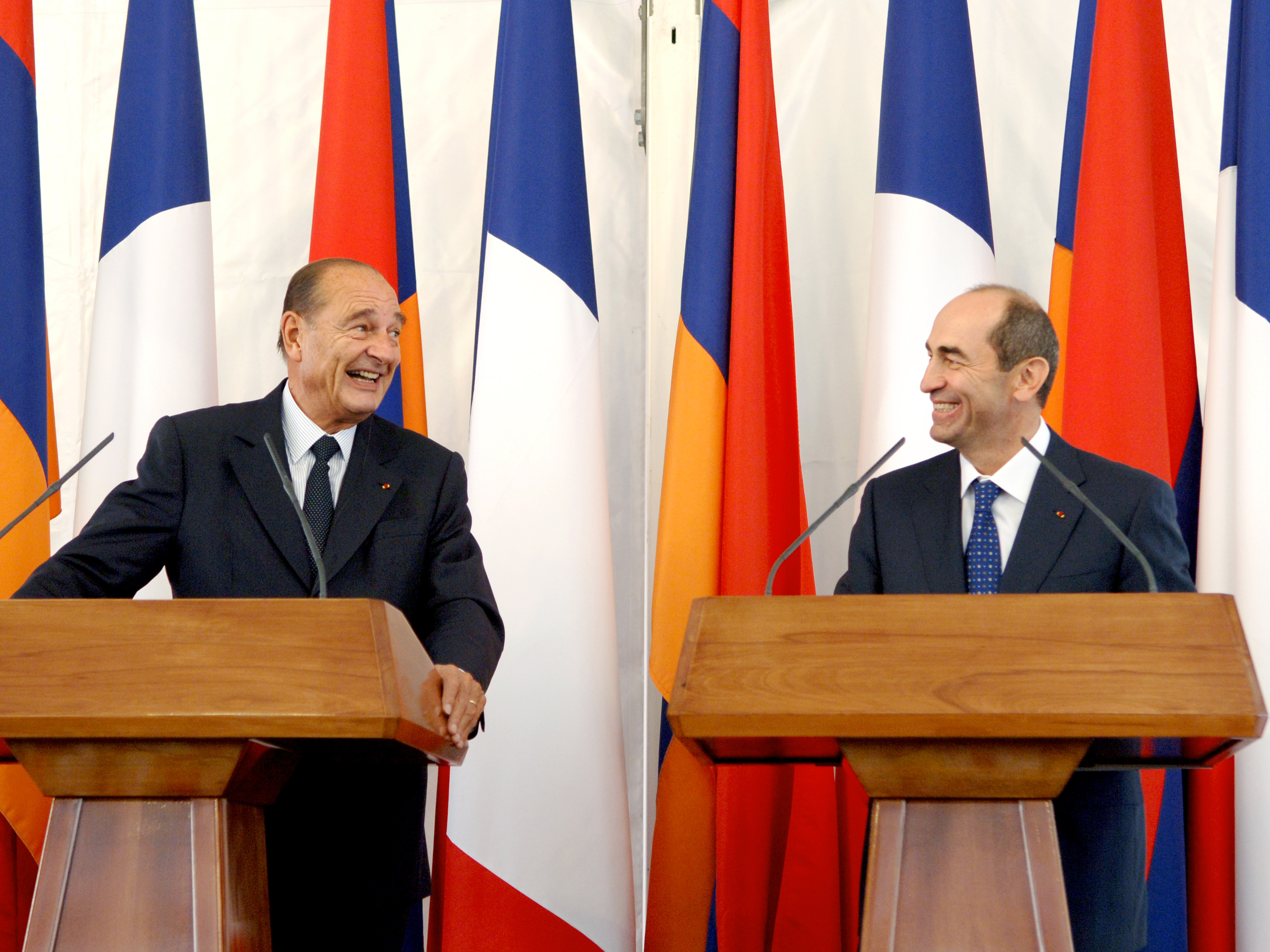
Chirac and Armenian president Robert Kocharyan, 2006

In July 2006, the G8 met to discuss international energy concerns. Despite the rising awareness of global warming issues, the G8 focused on "energy security" issues. Chirac continued to be the voice within the G8 summit meetings to support international action to curb global warming and climate change concerns. Chirac warned that "humanity is dancing on a volcano" and called for serious action by the world's leading industrialised nations.

After Chirac's death in 2019, the street leading to the Louvre Abu Dhabi was named Jacques Chirac Street in November 2019 in celebration of Chirac's efforts to bolster links between France and the United Arab Emirates during his presidency.

Chirac espoused a staunchly pro-Moroccan policy, and the already established pro-Moroccan French stances vis-à-vis the Western Sahara conflict were strengthened during his presidential tenure.

==== Flight tax ====
Chirac requested the Landau-report (published in September 2004) and combined with the Report of the Technical Group on Innovative Financing Mechanisms formulated upon request by the Heads of State of Brazil, Chile, France and Spain (issued in December 2004), these documents present various opportunities for innovative financing mechanisms while equally stressing the advantages (stability and predictability) of tax-based models. The UNITAID project was born. Today the organisation's executive board is chaired by Marisol Touraine.

==== 2005 referendum on TCE ====
On 29 May 2005, a referendum was held in France to decide whether the country should ratify the proposed treaty for a Constitution of the European Union (TCE). The result was a victory for the No campaign, with 55 per cent of voters rejecting the treaty on a turnout of 69 per cent, dealing a devastating blow to Chirac and the Union for a Popular Movement (UMP) party, and to part of the centre-left which had supported the TCE. Following the referendum defeat, Chirac replaced his prime minister Jean-Pierre Raffarin with Dominique de Villepin. In an address to the nation, Chirac declared that the new cabinet's top priority was to curb unemployment, which was consistently hovering above 10 per cent, calling for a "national mobilisation" to that effect.

==== 2005 civil unrest and CPE protests ====
Following major student protests in spring 2006, which followed civil unrest in autumn 2005 after the death of two young boys in Clichy-sous-Bois, one of the poorest communes in Paris' suburbs, Chirac retracted the proposed First Employment Contract (CPE) by "promulgating [it] without applying it", an unheard-of – and, some claim, illegal – move intended to appease the protesters while giving the appearance of not making a volte-face regarding the contract, and therefore to continue his support for his prime minister Dominique de Villepin.

==== Retirement ====
In early September 2005, Chirac suffered an event that his doctors described as a "vascular incident". It was officially reported as a "minor stroke" or a mild stroke (also known as a transient ischemic attack). He recovered and returned to his duties soon afterward.

In a pre-recorded television broadcast aired on 11 March 2007, he announced, in a widely predicted move, that he would not choose to seek a third term as president. (In 2000 the constitution was amended to reduce the length of the presidential term to five years, so his second term was shorter than his first.) "My whole life has been committed to serving France, and serving peace", Chirac said, adding that he would find new ways to serve France after leaving office. He did not explain the reasons for his decision. He did not, during the broadcast, endorse any of the candidates running for election, but did devote several minutes of his talk to a plea against extremist politics that was considered a thinly disguised invocation to voters not to vote for Jean-Marie Le Pen and a recommendation to Nicolas Sarkozy not to orient his campaign so as to include themes traditionally associated with Le Pen.

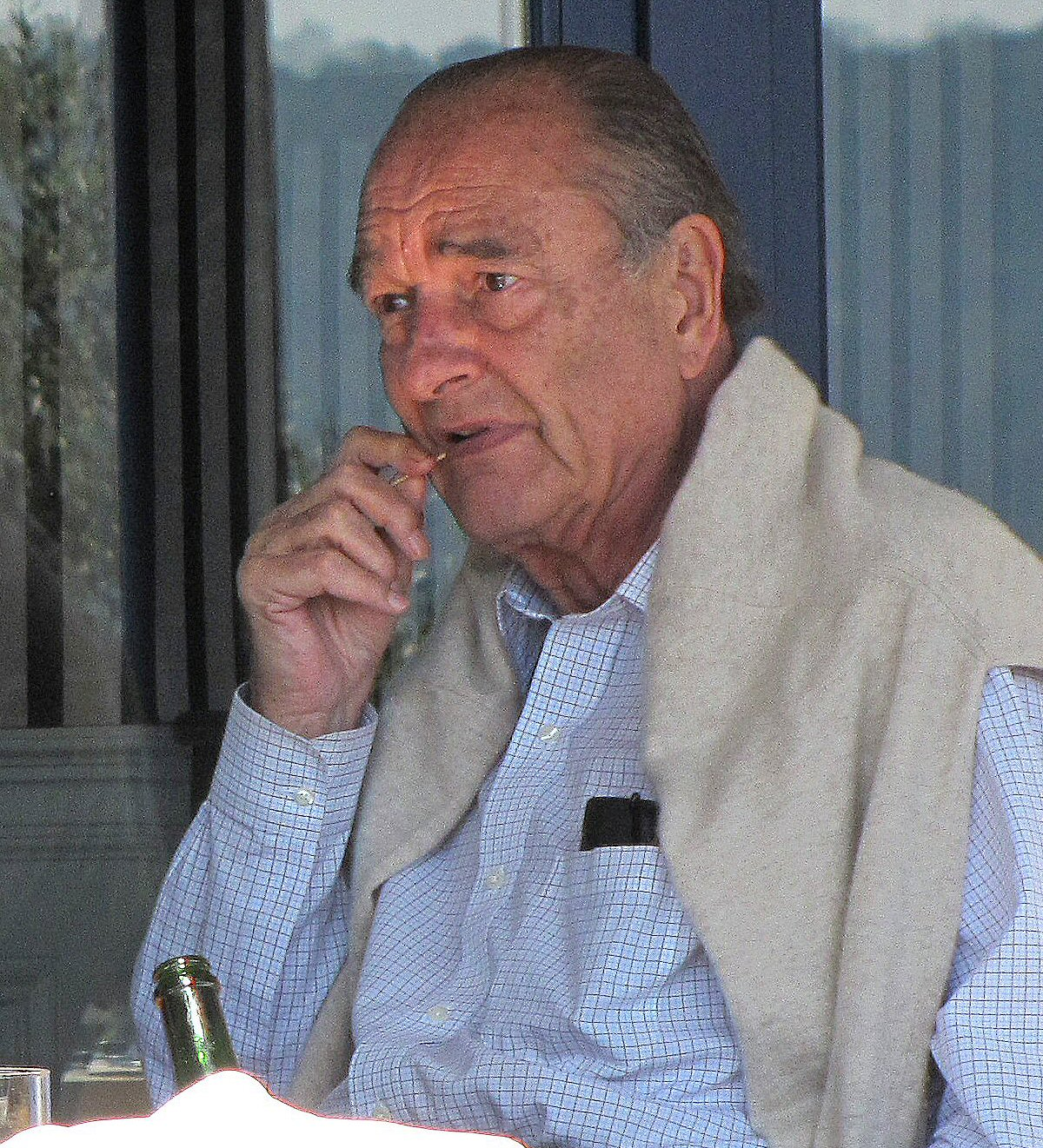
Chirac in Saint-Tropez, 2010

== Post-presidency (2007–2019) ==
Shortly after leaving office, he launched the Fondation Chirac in June 2008. Since then it has been striving for peace through five advocacy programmes: conflict prevention, access to water and sanitation, access to quality medicines and healthcare, access to land resources, and preservation of cultural diversity. It supports field projects that involve local people and provide concrete and innovative solutions. Chirac chaired the jury for the Prize for Conflict Prevention awarded every year by his foundation. As a former president of France, he was entitled to a lifetime pension and personal security protection, and was an ex officio member for life of the Constitutional Council. He sat for the first time on the council on 15 November 2007, six months after leaving the presidency. Immediately after Sarkozy's victory, Chirac moved into a 180-square-metre (1,900 sq ft) duplex on the Quai Voltaire in Paris lent to him by the family of former Lebanese prime minister Rafik Hariri. During the Didier Schuller affair, the latter accused Hariri of having participated in illegal funding of the RPR's political campaigns, but the judge closed the case without further investigations. In Volume 2 of his memoirs published in June 2011, Chirac mocked his successor Nicolas Sarkozy as "irritable, rash, impetuous, disloyal, ungrateful, and un-French".

Chirac wrote that he considered firing Sarkozy previously, and conceded responsibility in allowing Jean-Marie Le Pen to advance in 2002. A poll conducted in 2010 suggested Chirac was the most admired political figure in France, while Sarkozy was 32nd. On 11 April 2008, Chirac's office announced that he had undergone successful surgery to fit a pacemaker.

Chirac suffered from frail health and memory loss in later life. In February 2014 he was admitted to hospital because of pains related to gout. On 10 December 2015, Chirac was hospitalised in Paris for undisclosed reasons, although his state of health did not "give any cause for concern", he remained for about a week in ICU. According to his son-in-law Frederic Salat-Baroux, Chirac was again hospitalised in Paris with a lung infection on 18 September 2016.

=== Death and state funeral ===
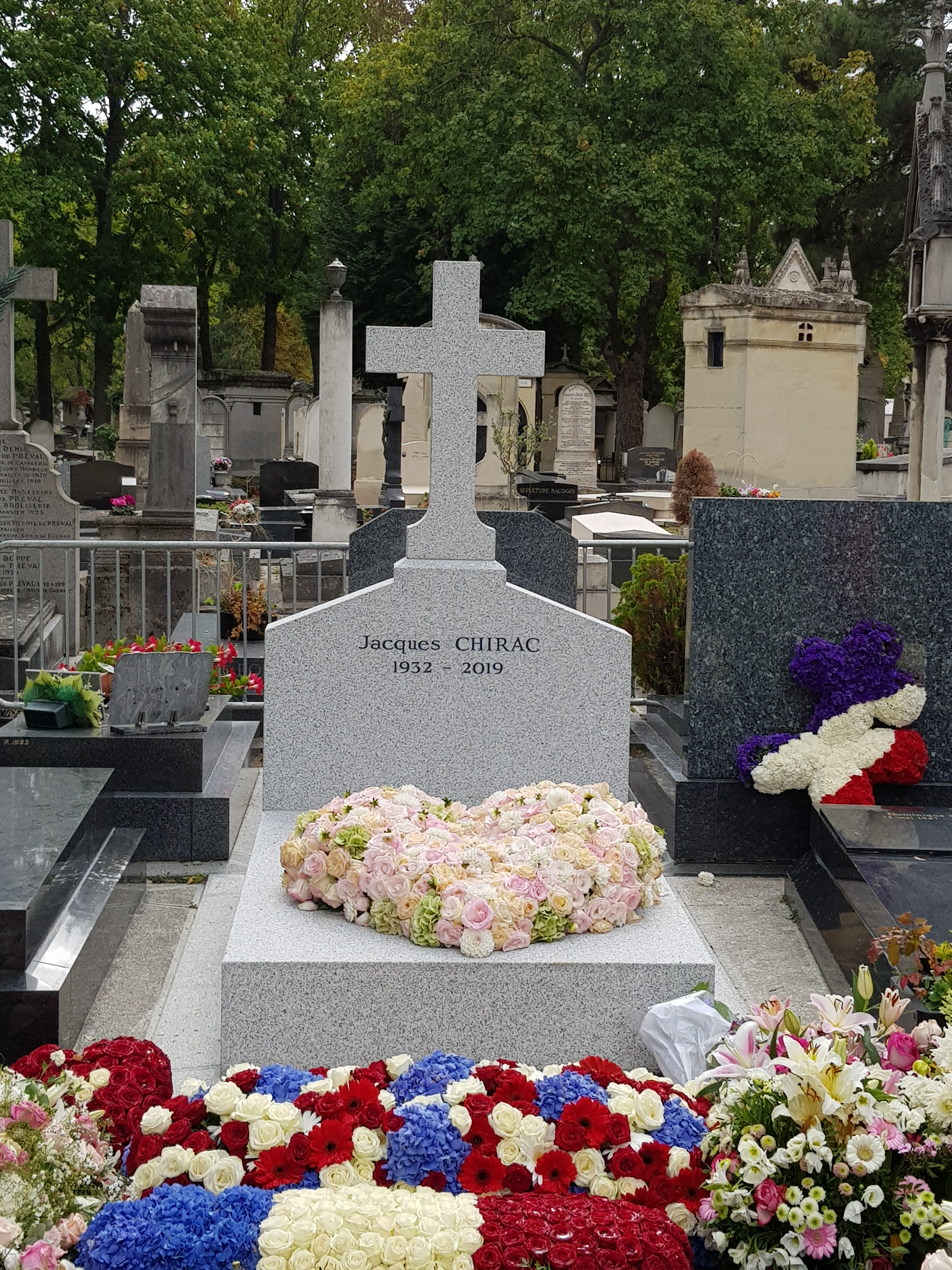
Chirac's grave in Montparnasse Cemetery, October 2019

Chirac died at his home in the 6th arrondissement of Paris on 26 September 2019, surrounded by his family. A requiem mass was held at Saint-Sulpice on 30 September, celebrated by Michel Aupetit, Archbishop of Paris, and attended by representatives from about 175 countries, included 69 past and present heads of state, government and international organisations. Notable names included António Guterres, Jean-Claude Juncker, Jens Stoltenberg, Vladimir Putin, Sergio Mattarella, Frank-Walter Steinmeier, Charles Michel, Viktor Orbán, Recep Tayyip Erdoğan, Saad Hariri, Borut Pahor, Salome Zourabichvili, Prince Edward, Jean Chrétien, Vaira Vike-Freiberga, Bill Clinton, Hamid Karzai, Dai Bingguo plus many ministers.

The day was declared a national day of mourning in France and a minute of silence was held nationwide at 15:00. Following the public ceremony, Chirac was buried at Montparnasse Cemetery, with only close family in attendance. Andorra announced three days of national mourning. Lebanon declared the day of the ex-president's funeral national day of mourning.

== Popular culture ==
Chirac was a major supporter of the nation's film industry.

Because of Jacques Chirac's long public career, he was often parodied or caricatured: Young Jacques Chirac is the basis of a young, dashing bureaucrat character in the 1976 Asterix comic strip album Obelix and Co., proposing methods to quell Gallic unrest to elderly, old-style Roman politicians. Chirac was also featured in Le Bêbête Show as an overexcited, jumpy character.

=== A major fixture of the Guignols ===
Jacques Chirac was a favourite character of Les Guignols de l'Info, a satiric latex puppet show. He was originally portrayed as a rather likeable, though overexcited, character; following the corruption allegations, however, he was depicted as a kind of dilettante and incompetent who pilfered public money and lied through his teeth. His character for a while developed a superhero alter ego, Super Menteur ('super liar') to get him out of embarrassing situations.

=== Satirical songs ===
In 1988, the band Parabellum lambasted Chirac in their song Anarchie en Chiraquie ("anarchy in Chirac-land"). In 1995, Zebda criticized Chirac's declarations on the "noise and smell" of immigrant families.

Because of his alleged improprieties, Chirac was lambasted in a song Chirac en prison ('Chirac in prison') by French punk band Les Wampas, with a video clip made by the Guignols. Similarly, the band Sinsemilia lambasted Chirac in the song Bienvenue en Chiraquie ("Welcome to Chirac-land") as being the leader of a political mafia behaving outside of the laws applicable to normal citizenry. In June 2005, the band attracted media controversy when, on live television during midday news, it stopped early playing the gentle Tout le bonheur du monde and instead started playing Bienvenue en Chiraquie as a political gesture, before being cut early.

=== Ig Nobel ===
He was given the Ig Nobel prize for peace, for commemorating the fiftieth anniversary of Hiroshima with atomic bomb tests in the Pacific (1996).

=== Portrayals in film ===
J. Grant Albrecht voices Chirac in the Oliver Stone film W. Marc Rioufol plays him in Richard Loncraine's 2010 film The Special Relationship.

Bernard Le Coq portrays Chirac in La Dernière Campagne and The Conquest by Xavier Durringer.

== Controversies ==
=== Osirak controversy ===
At the invitation of Saddam Hussein (then vice-president of Iraq, but de facto dictator), Chirac made an official visit to Baghdad in 1975. Hussein approved a deal granting French oil companies a number of privileges plus a 23-percent share of Iraqi oil. As part of this deal, France sold Iraq the Osirak MTR nuclear reactor, designed to test nuclear materials.

The Israeli Air Force alleged that the reactor's imminent commissioning was a threat to its security, and pre-emptively bombed the Osirak reactor on 7 June 1981, provoking considerable anger from French officials and the United Nations Security Council.

The Osirak deal became a controversy again in 2002–2003, when an international military coalition led by the United States invaded Iraq and forcibly removed Hussein's government from power. France led several other European countries in an effort to prevent the invasion. The Osirak deal was then used by parts of the American media to criticise the Chirac-led opposition to starting a war in Iraq, despite French involvement in the Gulf War.

=== Conviction for corruption ===
Chirac has been named in several cases of alleged corruption that occurred during his term as mayor, some of which have led to felony convictions of some politicians and aides. However, a controversial judicial decision in 1999 granted Chirac immunity while he was president of France. He refused to testify on these matters, arguing that it would be incompatible with his presidential functions. Investigations concerning the running of Paris's city hall, the number of whose municipal employees increased by 25% from 1977 to 1995 (with 2,000 out of approximately 35,000 coming from the Corrèze region where Chirac had held his seat as deputy), as well as a lack of financial transparency (marchés publics) and the communal debt, were thwarted by the legal impossibility of questioning him as president.

The conditions of the privatisation of the Parisian water system acquired very cheaply by the Compagnie Générale des Eaux and the Lyonnaise des Eaux, then directed by Jérôme Monod, a close friend of Chirac, were also criticised. Furthermore, the satirical newspaper Le Canard enchaîné revealed the astronomical "food expenses" paid by the Parisian municipality (€15 million a year according to the Canard), expenses managed by Roger Romani (who allegedly destroyed all archives of the period 1978–93 during night raids in 1999–2000). Thousands of people were invited each year to receptions in the Paris city hall, while many political, media and artistic personalities were hosted in private flats owned by the city.

Chirac's immunity from prosecution ended in May 2007, when he left office as president. In November 2007 a preliminary charge of misuse of public funds was filed against him. Chirac is said to be the first former French head of state to be formally placed under investigation for a crime. On 30 October 2009, a judge ordered Chirac to stand trial on embezzlement charges, dating back to his time as mayor of Paris.

On 7 March 2011, he went on trial on charges of diverting public funds, accused of giving fictional city jobs to 28 activists from his political party while serving as the mayor of Paris (1977–95). Along with Chirac, nine others stood trial in two separate cases, one dealing with fictional jobs for 21 people and the other with jobs for the remaining seven. The President of Union for a Popular Movement, who later served as France's Minister of Foreign Affairs, Alain Juppé, was sentenced to a 14-month suspended prison sentence for the same case in 2004.

On 15 December 2011, Chirac was found guilty and given a suspended sentence of two years. He was convicted of diverting public funds, abuse of trust and illegal conflict of interest. The suspended sentence meant he did not have to go to prison and took into account his age, health and status as a former head of state. He did not attend the trial, since medical doctors deemed that his neurological problems damaged his memory. His defence team decided not to appeal.

=== The Clearstream Affair ===
During April and May 2006, Chirac's administration was beset by a crisis as his chosen prime minister, Dominique de Villepin, was accused of asking Philippe Rondot, a top-level French spy, for a secret investigation into Villepin's chief political rival, Nicolas Sarkozy, in 2004. This matter has been called the second Clearstream Affair. On 10 May 2006, following a Cabinet meeting, Chirac made a rare television appearance to try to protect Villepin from the scandal and to debunk allegations that Chirac himself had set up a Japanese bank account containing 300 million francs in 1992 as Mayor of Paris. Chirac said that "The Republic is not a dictatorship of rumours, a dictatorship of calumny."

== Personal life ==
In March 1956, Chirac married Bernadette Chodron de Courcel, with whom he had two daughters: Laurence (4 March 1958 – 14 April 2016) and Claude (born 6 December 1962). Claude was a long-term public relations assistant and personal adviser to her father, while Laurence, who suffered from anorexia nervosa in her youth, did not participate in her father's political activities. Chirac was the grandfather of Martin Rey-Chirac by the relationship of Claude with French judoka Thierry Rey. A former Vietnamese refugee, Anh Dao Traxel, is a foster daughter of Jacques and Bernadette Chirac.

Chirac was a close friend of actor Gregory Peck.

== Academic works ==
In 1954, Chirac presented The Development of the Port of New-Orleans, a short geography/economic thesis to the Institut d'Études Politiques de Paris (Sciences Po—), which he had entered three years before. The 182-page typewritten work, supervised by Professor Jean Chardonnet, is illustrated by photographs, sketches and diagrams.

== Political career ==
- President of the French Republic: 1995–2007. Re-elected in 2002.
- Member of the Constitutional Council of France: Since 2007.

=== Governmental functions ===
- Prime minister: 1974–76 (Resignation) / 1986–88.
- Minister of Interior: March–May 1974.
- Minister of Agriculture and Rural Development: 1972–74.
- Minister of Relation with Parliament: 1971–72.
- Secretary of State for Economy and Finance: 1968–71.
- Secretary of State for Social Affairs: 1967–68.

=== Electoral mandates ===
==== European Parliament ====
- Member of European Parliament: 1979–80 (Resignation). Elected in 1979.

==== National Assembly of France ====
- Elected in 1967, re-elected in 1968, 1973, 1976, 1981, 1986, 1988, 1993: Member for Corrèze: March–April 1967 (became Secretary of State in April 1967), re-elected in 1968, 1973, but he remained a minister in 1976–1986 (became prime minister in 1986), 1988–95 (resigned to become President of the French Republic in 1995).

==== General Council ====
- President of the General Council of Corrèze: 1970–1979. Re-elected in 1973, and 1976.
- General councillor of Corrèze: 1968–88. Re-elected in 1970, 1976, and 1982.

==== Municipal Council ====
- Mayor of Paris: 1977–95 (Resignation, became President of the French Republic in 1995). Reelected in 1983, 1989.
- Councillor of Paris: 1977–1995 (Resignation). Re-elected in 1983, 1989.
- Municipal councillor of Sainte-Féréole: 1965–77. Re-elected in 1971.

=== Political function ===
- President of the Rally for the Republic: 1976–94 (Resignation).

== Ministries ==
=== First Chirac ministry ===
(27 May 1974 – 25 August 1976)

- Jacques Chirac – Prime Minister
- Jean Sauvagnargues – Minister of Foreign Affairs
- Jacques Soufflet – Minister of Defence
- Michel Poniatowski – Minister of the Interior
- Jean-Pierre Fourcade – Minister of Economy and Finance
- Michel d'Ornano – Minister of Industry, Tourism, Posts, and Telecommunications
- Michel Durafour – Minister of Employment and Social Affairs
- Jean Lecanuet – Minister of Justice
- René Haby – Minister of National Education
- Simone Veil – Minister of Health
- Christian Bonnet – Minister of Agriculture
- Norbert Ségard – Minister of External Trade
- Robert Galley – Minister of Equipment
- Vincent Ansquer – Minister of Trade and Craft
- Pierre Abelin – Minister of Cooperation
- Jean-Jacques Servan-Schreiber – Minister of Reforms
- André Jarrot – Minister of Quality of Life

=== Second Chirac ministry ===
(20 March 1986 – 12 May 1988)

- Jacques Chirac – Prime Minister
- Jean-Bernard Raimond – Minister of Foreign Affairs
- André Giraud – Minister of Defence
- Charles Pasqua – Minister of the Interior
- Édouard Balladur – Minister of State, Minister of Economy, Finance, and Privatisation
- Alain Madelin – Minister of Industry, Tourism, Posts, and Telecommunications
- Philippe Séguin – Minister of Employment and Social Affairs
- Albin Chalandon – Minister of Justice
- René Monory – Minister of National Education
- François Léotard – Minister of Culture and Communications
- François Guillaume – Minister of Agriculture
- Bernard Pons – Minister of Overseas Departments and Territories
- Pierre Méhaignerie – Minister of Housing, Equipment, Regional Planning, and Transport
- André Rossinot – Minister for Relations with Parliament
- Michel Aurillac – Minister of Cooperation

== Honours ==
=== National honours ===
Ribbon	Description	Year
	Grand Master & Grand Cross of the National Order of the Legion of Honour	
	Grand Master & Grand Cross of the National Order of Merit	
	Knight of the Order of the Black Star	
	Commander of the Order of Agricultural Merit	
	Knight of the Ordre des Arts et des Lettres	
	Cross for Military Valour	
	Combatant's Cross	
	Aeronautical Medal	
	North Africa Security and Order Operations Commemorative Medal	

=== Foreign honours ===
Jacques Chirac coat of arms as a knight of the Swedish Order of the Seraphim

Ribbon	Country	Honour	Year
	Austria	Grand Star of the Decoration of Honour for Services to the Republic of Austria	1998
	Azerbaijan	Collar of the Heydar Aliyev Order	2007
	Benin	Grand Cross of the National Order of Benin	1996
	Bolivia	Collar of the Order of the Condor of the Andes	1997
	Brazil	Grand Collar of the Order of the Southern Cross	
Officer National Order of Québec Undressed Ribbon	Canada	Officier of the National Order of Quebec	1987
	Czech Republic	Grand Cross of the Order of the White Lion	1997
	Estonia	Member 1st Class of the Order of the Cross of Terra Mariana	2001
	Finland	Grand Cross with Collar of the Order of the White Rose of Finland	1999
	Hungary	Grand Cross with Chain of the Order of Merit of the Republic of Hungary	2001
	Italy	Knight Grand Cross with Collar Order of Merit of the Italian Republic	1999
	Iceland	Grand Knight's Cross with Star of the Order of the Falcon	1983
	Jordan	Grand Cordon with Collar of the Order of Al-Hussein bin Ali	2012
	Kuwait	Grand Cordon of the Order of Mubarak the Great	2006
	Latvia	Commander Grand Cross with Chain Order of the Three Stars	2006
	Lebanon	Grand Cordon of the National Order of the Cedar	2012
	Libyan Arab Jamahiriya	First Class of the Order of the Grand Conqueror	2004
	Lithuania	Grand Cross of the Order of Vytautas the Great	1999
	Lithuania	Grand Cross of the Order of the Lithuanian Grand Duke Gediminas	2001
	Sovereign Military Order of Malta	Civilian Class of the Order pro Merito Melitensi	1996
	Monaco	Grand Cross of the Order of Saint-Charles	1997
	Moldova	Collar of the Order of the Republic	1998
	Morocco	Grand Cross of the Order of Ouissam Alaouite	1987
	Norway	Grand Cross of the Order of St. Olav	2000
	Norway	Grand Cross of the Royal Norwegian Order of Merit	1988
	Palestine	Grand Collar of the State of Palestine	1996
1st class	Poland	Grand Cross of the Order of Merit of the Republic of Poland	
	Poland	Knight of the Order of the White Eagle	2000
	Portugal	Grand Cross of the Order of Christ	1975
	Portugal	Grand Collar of the Order of Prince Henry	2000
ROU Order of the Star of Romania 1999 GCross BAR	Romania	Grand Collar of the Order of the Star of Romania	1998
	Russia	Member 1st Class of the Order "For Merit to the Fatherland"	1997
	Russia	Medal "In Commemoration of the 300th Anniversary of Saint Petersburg"	2003
	Russia	State Prize of the Russian Federation	1997
	Senegal	Grand Cross of the National Order of the Lion	2005
	South Africa	Grand Cross of the Order of Good Hope	1996
	South Korea	Grand Order of Mugunghwa	2000
	Spain	Knight of the Collar of the Order of Charles III	2006
	Spain	Knight of the Collar of the Order of Isabella the Catholic	1999
	Sweden	Knight of the Royal Order of the Seraphim	2000
	Tunisia	Grand Cordon of the Order of Independence	1986
	Tunisia	Grand Cordon of the Order of the Republic of Tunisia	2003
Order of Prince Yaroslav the Wise 1st 2nd and 3rd Class of Ukraine	Ukraine	First Class of the Order of Prince Yaroslav the Wise	1997
	United Arab Emirates	Collar of the Order of Etihad (Order of the Federation)	1997
	United Kingdom	Honorary Knight Grand Cross of the Order of the Bath	
	Uruguay	Medal of the Oriental Republic of Uruguay	1996
VAT Order of Pope Pius IX Collar BAR	Holy See	Knight with the Collar of the Order of Pope Pius IX	1996

=== Other ===
On 22 July 2003, Jacques Chirac was presented with the inaugural Kuala Lumpur World Peace Award by Malaysian Prime Minister Mahathir Mohamad at his office.

== Publications ==
- Discours pour la France à l'heure du choix, Paris, ed. Stock, 1978
- La Lueur de l'espérance. Réflexion du soir pour le matin, Paris, ed. La Table ronde, 1978
- Oui à l'Europe (With Alain Berger), Paris, ed. Albatros, 1984
- Une ambition pour la France, Paris, ed. Albin Michel, 1988
- Une nouvelle France. Réflexions 1, Paris, ed. NiL, 1994
- La France pour tous, Paris, ed. NiL Éditions, 1995
- Mon combat pour la France, tome I, Paris, ed. Odile Jacob, 2006
- Le Développement du port de la Nouvelle-Orléans, Paris, ed. Presses universitaires du Nouveau Monde, 2007
- Mon combat pour la paix, tome II, Paris, ed. Odile Jacob, 2007
- Demain, il sera trop tard, Paris, ed. Desclée de Brouwer, 2008
- Mémoires : Tome I, Chaque pas doit être un but, Paris, ed. NiL, 2009
- Mémoires : Tome II, Le Temps présidentiel, Paris, ed. NiL Éditions, 2011

== See also ==
- 1995 French presidential election
- List of Ig Nobel Prize winners
- Musée du Président Jacques Chirac
- Musée du Quai Branly – Jacques Chirac

Political offices
Preceded by Roger Frey	Delegate Minister for Parliamentary Relations; 1971–1972	Succeeded by Robert Boulin
Preceded by Michel Cointat	Minister of Agriculture; 1972–1974	Succeeded by Raymond Marcellin
Preceded by Raymond Marcellin	Minister of the Interior; 1974	Succeeded by Michel Poniatowski
Preceded by Pierre Messmer	Prime Minister of France; 1974–1976	Succeeded by Raymond Barre
New office	Mayor of Paris; 1977–1995	Succeeded by Jean Tiberi
Preceded by Laurent Fabius	Prime Minister of France; 1986–1988	Succeeded by Michel Rocard
Preceded by François Mitterrand	President of France; 1995–2007	Succeeded by Nicolas Sarkozy
Party political offices
Preceded by Alexandre Sanguinetti	Leader of the Union of Democrats for the Republic; 1974–1975	Succeeded by André Bord
New political party	Leader of Rally for the Republic; 1976–1994	Succeeded by Alain Juppé
Regnal titles
Preceded by François Mitterrand	Co-Prince of Andorra; 1995–2007; With Joan Martí Alanis (until 2003), then Joan Enric Vives Sicília (from 2003)	Succeeded by Nicolas Sarkozy
Preceded by Joan Martí Alanis	Co-Prince of Andorra; 1995–2007; With Joan Martí Alanis (until 2003), then Joan Enric Vives Sicília (from 2003)	Succeeded by Joan Enric Vives Sicília
Catholic Church titles
Preceded by François Mitterrand	Honorary Canon of the Archbasilica of Saint John Lateran; 1995–2007	Succeeded by Nicolas Sarkozy
Diplomatic posts
Preceded by Jean Chrétien	Chairperson of the Group of 7; 1996	Succeeded by Bill Clinton
Preceded by Jean Chrétien	Chairperson of the Group of 8; 2003	Succeeded by George W. Bush
