= Éric Halphen =

French judge (born 1959)

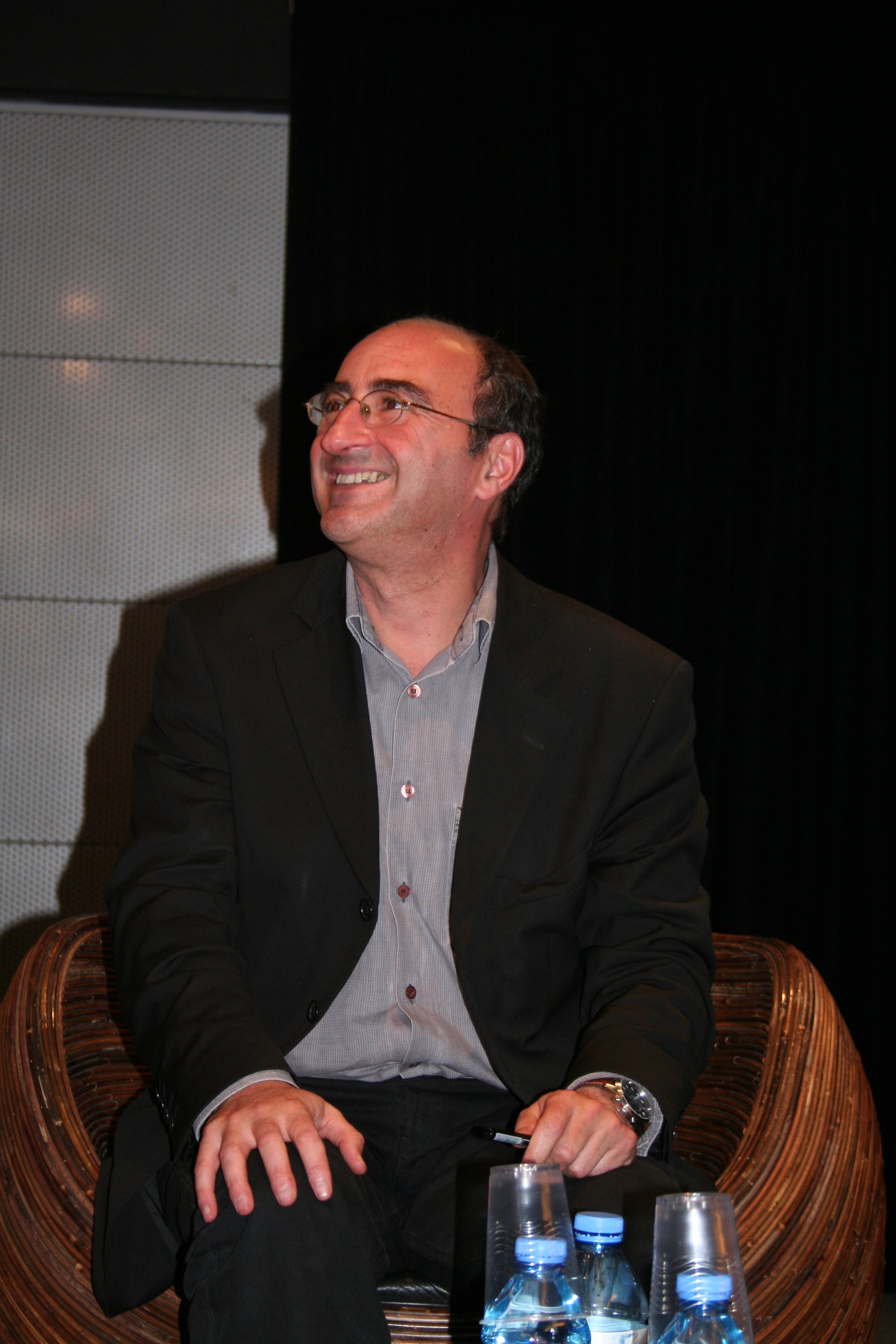
- Éric Halphen in 2006
- Born: 5 October 1959 (age 66); Clichy, France
- Education: University of Paris-Sud; Panthéon-Assas University; French National School for the Judiciary
- Occupation: Magistrate

Éric Halphen (born 5 October 1959) is a French judge best known as the investigating magistrate in the Parisian low-cost housing scandals of the 1990s.

== Timeline ==
- 1959. (5 October) Born at Clichy-la-Garenne (Hauts-de-Seine). Later received his Baccalauréat in literature at Versailles, and studied law at Assas.
- 1982. Graduated from the École nationale de la magistrature (ENM).
- 1984. Examining magistrate at Douai, and then Chartres.
- 1989. Elected to the Tribunal de Grande instance at Créteil as investigating magistrate.
- 1994. Start of the Paris HLM scandal.
- 2002. Retired as a judge.

== The Paris HLM scandal ==
In January 1994 Halphen began an inquiry following the discovery of a series of forged invoices between Jean-Claude Méry and companies that were providing services to HLMs (subsidised low-cost housing) in Paris. In September 1994, Jean-Claude Méry, a former member of the central committee of the RPR political party was imprisoned for his involvement.

The inquiry also investigated the conduct of the HLM office in the neighbouring Hauts-de-Seine department, at the time run by Didier Schuller and Patrick Balkany, close associates of Charles Pasqua. In December 1994, Jean-Pierre Maréchal, Halphen's father-in-law, was arrested in Roissy when he was seen receiving a briefcase full of money from Didier Schuller, in what was later described as a failed attempt to bribe Halphen. Didier Schuller disappeared, only returning from hiding in 2002.

In 1996 the former vice president of OPAC – the public body controlling low-cost housing – François Ciolina, exposed corruption surrounding the HLM apartment owned by the son of Jean Tiberi, the mayor of Paris. In June of that year, Halphen ordered a search of the mayor's house only to be prevented from doing so when the policemen on the scene, following orders from their superiors, refused to take part. They were later sanctioned.

In 1999 Jean Tiberi was again investigated for "complicity in corruption". The mayor, acting in his role as head of Opac, denied all wrongdoing, and in November, Halphen closed the case.

The following year, shortly after the death of Jean-Claude Méry, the newspaper Le Monde published the contents of a film made in December 1995 by journalist Arnaud Hamelin. In the tape, Méry spoke of how he had delivered 5 million Francs in cash to Michel Roussin, chief of staff of then prime minister Jacques Chirac. Halphen relaunched the HLM inquiry, and in March 2001 summoned president Chirac to give testimony in the case, although Chirac refused claiming that it would be incompatible with his duties as president.

In September 2001 the court of appeal ruled that Halphen did not have sufficient grounds to reopen the case and overturned all its findings. He was removed from the investigations and replaced with judge Armand Riberolles.

In January 2002 Halphen announced that he was quitting his position as judge and turned to writing. He was a vocal supporter of Jean-Pierre Chevènement's presidential campaign, later distancing himself after Chevènement fell in with the political right. He is a member of Roland Castro's 'Mouvement de l'Utopie Concrète'.

== Bibliography ==
- 2002 : Sept ans de solitude (Seven Years of Solitude), Editions Gallimard
- 2006 : Baisers maudits (Cursed Kisses), novel published by Buchet-Chastel
- 2006 : Le bal des outrés (The Extravagant Ball), Editions Privé

== See also ==
- Corruption scandals in the Paris region
