= Jean Tiberi =

French politician (1935–2025)

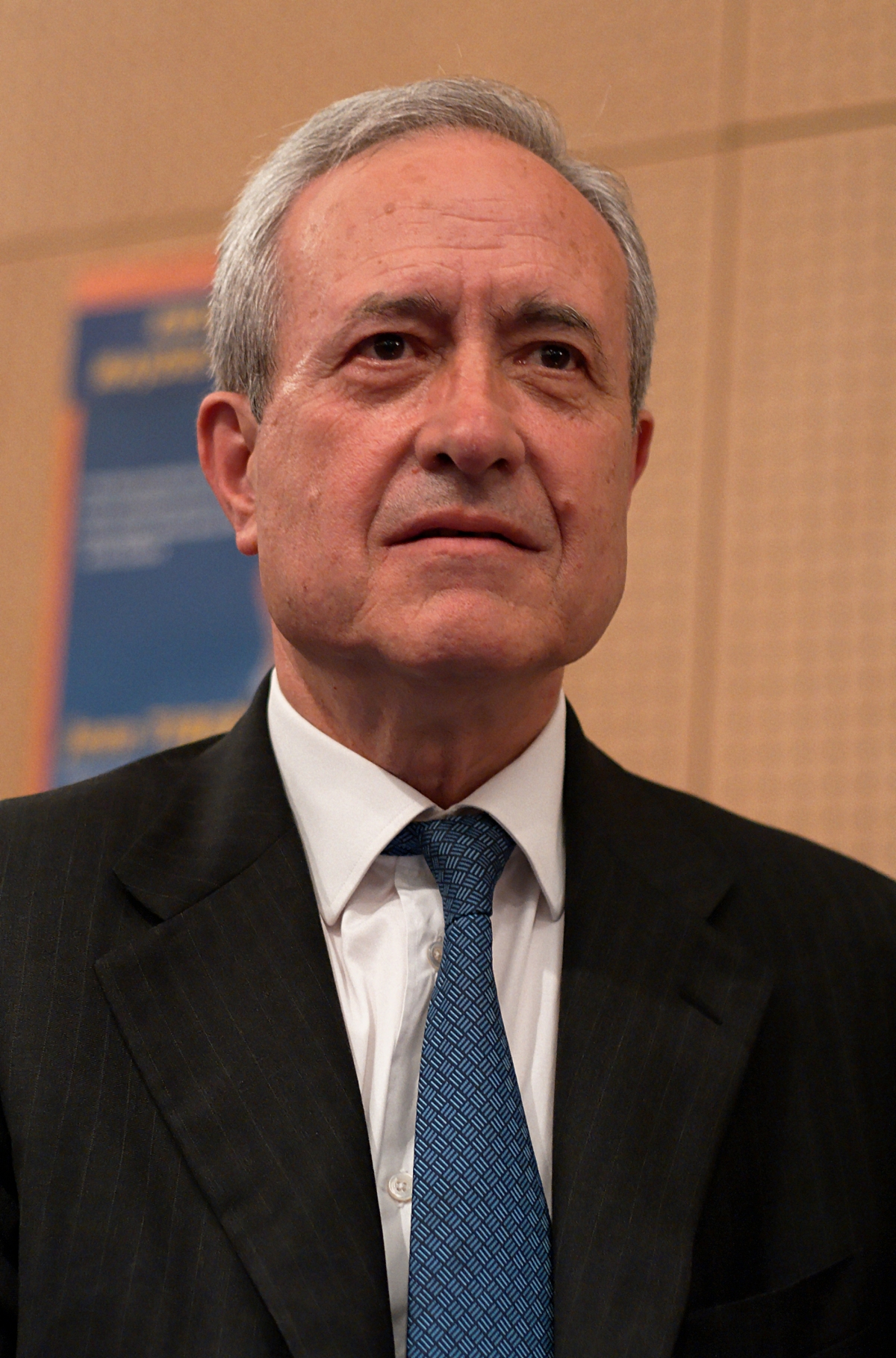

Mayor of Paris
- In office 22 May 1995 – 24 March 2001
- Deputy: Jacques Dominati
- Preceded by: Jacques Chirac
- Succeeded by: Bertrand Delanoë

First Deputy Mayor of Paris
- In office 1983 – May 1995
- Mayor: Jacques Chirac
- Preceded by: Christian de La Malène
- Succeeded by: Jacques Dominati

Member of the National Assembly for Paris's 2nd constituency
- In office 14 November 1976 – 19 June 2012
- Preceded by: Monique Tisné
- Succeeded by: François Fillon
- In office 13 August 1968 – 12 February 1976
- Preceded by: René Capitant
- Succeeded by: Monique Tisné

Secretary of State for the Food Industry
- In office 12 February 1976 – 25 August 1976
- President: Valéry Giscard d'Estaing
- Prime Minister: Jacques Chirac

Mayor of the 5th arrondissement of Paris
- In office 25 March 2001 – 13 April 2014
- Preceded by: Jean-Charles Bardon
- Succeeded by: Florence Berthout
- In office 14 March 1983 – 21 May 1995
- Succeeded by: Jean-Charles Bardon

Personal details
- Born: 30 January 1935 Paris, France
- Died: 27 May 2025 (aged 90) Paris, France
- Party: RPR
- Spouse: Xavière Casanova
- Children: Dominique
- Education: Lycée Louis-le-Grand
- Alma mater: University of Paris

Jean Tiberi (French pronunciation: [ʒɑ̃ tibeʁi]; 30 January 1935 – 27 May 2025) was a French politician who served as mayor of Paris from 1995 to 2001.

== Life and career ==
Of Corsican descent, Tiberi first entered the National Assembly of France in August 1968 as the replacement for René Capitant, who was appointed to the government as Minister of Justice. He was re-elected in the 1973 election, serving until early 1976, when he was appointed to the government as Secretary of State in charge of Food Industries, under the Minister of Agriculture and the Minister of Industry and Research. He served in that position until August 1976, after which he returned to the National Assembly in a by-election in November 1976 to replace Monique Tisne. He was re-elected to the National Assembly in every subsequent election until 2012.

He was Mayor of the 5th arrondissement of Paris from March 1983 to May 1995, when he became Mayor of Paris. After serving as Mayor of Paris, he was again elected as Mayor of the 5th arrondissement in 2001.

Jean Tiberi and his wife Xavière Tiberi were involved in corruption scandals in the Paris region in which Mr Tiberi was convicted of vote-rigging and given a ten-month suspended prison sentence.

In 1998, a justice-ordered search of Jean and Xavière Tiberi's apartment on the Place du Panthéon showed that they possessed two pistols whose authorization had expired in 1991 and five ammunition boxes. They were not prosecuted in exchange for the destruction of the weapons.

The above actions are sometimes referred to by the press as Corsican mores.

Along with Jean-Pierre Soisson and Didier Julia, Tiberi was among the longest-serving members of the National Assembly, in which he served 10 terms and 44 years. He did not run for re-election in 2012.

A friend of Jean-Edern Hallier, he had been a Cercle InterHallier member since 2019.

Tiberi died in Paris on 27 May 2025, at the age of 90.

Political offices
Preceded by Jacques Chirac	Mayor of Paris; 1995–2001	Succeeded by Bertrand Delanoë
