= Robert Pandraud =

French politician (1928–2010)

Robert Pandraud (October 16, 1928, in Puy-en-Velay (Haute-Loire) – February 18, 2010, in Suresnes (Hauts-de-Seine)), was a French politician.

Former director of the national police, member of the RPR then of the UMP, he was Minister Delegate for Security (1986 - 1988) under the Minister of Interior Charles Pasqua in the second Jacques Chirac government during the cohabitation then MP for Seine-Saint-Denis (1988 - 2007).
