= Pierre Haïk =

French lawyer (1950–2023)

- Born: 9 August 1950; Tlemcen, French Algeria
- Died: 19 February 2023 (aged 72); Garches, France
- Occupation: Lawyer
- Spouse: Jacqueline Laffont

Pierre Haïk (9 August 1950 – 19 February 2023) was a French lawyer. He defended high-profile politicians, such as Nicolas Sarkozy, Serge Dassault and Charles Pasqua.

== Biography ==
Born in Tlemcen, French Algeria, on 9 August 1950, Haïk began his career in law, working on cases of robbery and gang violence. He began a partnership with Thierry Herzog. He focused particularly on the Gang des postiches cases and the UBS robberies. In the 1990s, he was joined by Hervé Temime on multiple criminal cases, leading his team to be dubbed as "les trois H".

In 1984, Haïk met Jacqueline Laffont, whom he later married. According to GQ, the two were among "the most powerful lawyers in France". In the late 1990s, he had numerous politicians as clients, including former Minister of the Interior Charles Pasqua, former President of Ivory Coast Laurent Gbagbo, the spouse of the Mayor of Paris Xavière Tiberi, and former chief executive of Vivendi, Jean-Marie Messier. He also defended Michel Roussin, former President Jacques Chirac's chief of staff in the Affaire des emplois fictifs de la mairie de Paris, businessman Alfred Sirven in the Affaire Elf, and Laurent Fabius's former cabinet director, Louis Schweitzer, in the incident of contaminated haemophilia blood products.

In the 2000s, Haïk defended the businessman Arcadi Gaydamak in the Mitterrand–Pasqua affair. In the 2010s, he defended Pasqua in the Affaire du siège de GEC-Alsthom Transport, while his wife defended Pasqua in the Affaire du casino d'Annemasse. The couple defended Patrice de Maistre in the Bettencourt affair, as well as Serge Dassault and Alexandre Benalla.

Due to Alzheimer's disease, Haïk began ending his activities in 2019. In 2020, his wife took over Sarkozy's case in the Bismuth affair. He died on 19 February 2023, at age 72.

== Distinctions ==
- Knight of the Legion of Honour (2009)
