= Gilbert Azibert =

French magistrate (1947–2026)

- Born: 2 February 1947; Marseille, France
- Died: 16 June 2026 (aged 79)
- Occupation: Magistrate of the Court of Cassation

Gilbert Azibert (1947 – 16 June 2026) was a French magistrate who was on the Court of Cassation.

Azibert was a co-defendant in the Nicolas Sarkozy corruption trial, along with former French President Nicolas Sarkozy and the president's former lawyer, Thierry Herzog. Like the other two defendants, Azibert would be convicted.

Azibert died on 16 June 2026, at the age of 79.
