= La France pour la vie =

Book by Nicolas Sarkozy

- First edition
- Authors: Nicolas Sarkozy
- Language: French
- Subject: French politics
- Genre: non-fiction
- Publisher: Plon
- Publication date: 2016
- Publication place: France
- ISBN: 978-2-259-24894-5
- Preceded by: Témoignage

La France pour la vie (English: "France for life") is a 2016 political memoir by Nicolas Sarkozy, the former president of France and chairman of The Republicans.

== Background ==
The book is written in the first person, like his 2006 book Témoignage, which was published before he was elected as president. President Sarkozy finished writing this book over the winter break of 2015. He has stressed that this is not a campaign book.

The commercial launch of the book is controversial regarding some other members of The Republicans.

== Content ==
In the book, President Sarkozy regrets taking a holiday on Vincent Bolloré's yacht and insulting a heckler at the start of his tenure as president. He adds that he wants to repeal the 35-hour workweek and the solidarity tax on wealth. He believes that same-sex marriage should remain legal in France.

Additionally, Sarkozy writes about his relationships with U.S. President George W. Bush and Russian President Vladimir Putin. He also analyzes his policies towards Libya and Georgia.

Marianne (magazine) writes a paper titled : "Sarkozy's method to transform your flaws into qualities", analyzing the book and comparing its content to a job interview.

== Errors ==
Several errors are in the book :

- The book mentions a "campaign of a rare violence" between Bush and Obama (page 73) while the Obama campaign was against John McCain (2008 United States presidential election)
- "Vincent Bolloré had no contract with the (French) state" (2007)
- claims to have decided the launch of a museum in Metz (Centre Pompidou-Metz), while it was started in 2006 and decided by Jacques Chirac
- In the book, Sarkozy claims to have "never given up facing street pressure" (that is, never given facing strike action and demonstrations in the streets), forgetting the taxi reform (recommended by the Commission pour la libération de la croissance française) cancelled by taxis strikes.

The newspaper Libération has published a fact checking article regarding some others errors.
