= Nicolas Sarkozy =

President of France from 2007 to 2012

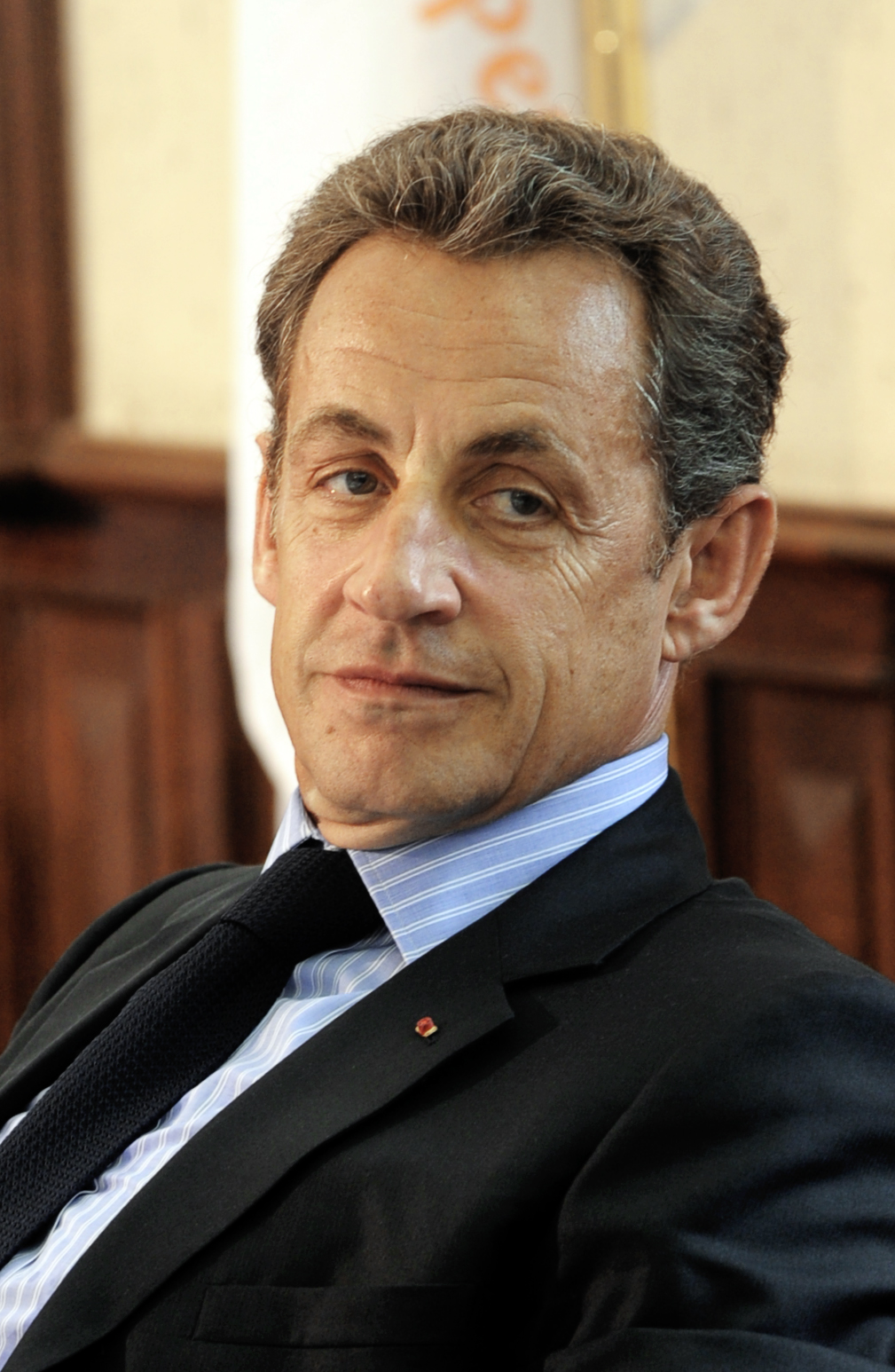
- Sarkozy in 2010

President of France
- In office 16 May 2007 – 15 May 2012
- Prime Minister: François Fillon
- Preceded by: Jacques Chirac
- Succeeded by: François Hollande
Other offices held
Minister of the Interior
In office 2 June 2005 – 26 March 2007
Prime Minister	Dominique de Villepin
Preceded by	Dominique de Villepin
Succeeded by	François Baroin
In office 7 May 2002 – 30 March 2004
Prime Minister	Jean-Pierre Raffarin
Preceded by	Daniel Vaillant
Succeeded by	Dominique de Villepin
President of the General Council of Hauts-de-Seine
In office 1 April 2004 – 14 May 2007
Preceded by	Charles Pasqua
Succeeded by	Patrick Devedjian
Minister of Finance
In office 31 March 2004 – 29 November 2004
Prime Minister	Jean-Pierre Raffarin
Preceded by	Francis Mer
Succeeded by	Hervé Gaymard
Minister of Communications
In office 19 July 1994 – 11 May 1995
Prime Minister	Édouard Balladur
Preceded by	Alain Carignon
Succeeded by	Catherine Trautmann
Minister of the Budget
In office 30 March 1993 – 11 May 1995
Prime Minister	Édouard Balladur
Preceded by	Michel Charasse
Succeeded by	François d'Aubert
Government Spokesperson
In office 30 March 1993 – 19 January 1995
Prime Minister	Édouard Balladur
Preceded by	Louis Mermaz
Succeeded by	Philippe Douste-Blazy
Mayor of Neuilly-sur-Seine
In office 14 April 1983 – 7 May 2002
Preceded by	Achille Peretti
Succeeded by	Louis-Charles Bary

Additional positions
- (see § Offices and distinctions)

Personal details
- Born: Nicolas Paul Stéphane Sarközy de Nagy-Bocsa; 28 January 1955 (age 71) Paris, France
- Party: The Republicans (2015–present)
- Other political affiliations: Union of Democrats for the Republic (1974–1976); Rally for the Republic (1976–2002); Union for a Popular Movement (2002–2015)
- Spouses: Marie-Dominique Culioli (m. 1982; div. 1996) Cécilia Ciganer-Albéniz (m. 1996; div. 2007) Carla Bruni (m. 2008)
- Children: 4, including Jean and Louis
- Education: Paris West University Nanterre La Défense (MA, DEA); Sciences Po (attended)

Nicolas Paul Stéphane Sarközy de Nagy-Bocsa (/sɑːrˈkoʊzi/ sar-KOH-zee; French: [nikɔla pɔl stefan saʁkɔzi]; born 28 January 1955) is a French former politician who served as the president of the French Republic from 2007 to 2012.

Sarkozy was born in Paris. He was the mayor of Neuilly-sur-Seine from 1983 to 2002, he was Minister of the Budget under Prime Minister Édouard Balladur (1993–1995) during François Mitterrand's second term. During Jacques Chirac's second presidential term, he served as Minister of the Interior and as Minister of Finances. He was the leader of the Union for a Popular Movement (UMP) party from 2004 to 2007.

He won the 2007 French presidential election by a 53.1% to 46.9% margin against Ségolène Royal, the Socialist Party (PS) candidate. During his term, he faced the 2008 financial crisis, the late-2000s recession, and the European sovereign debt crisis, the Russo-Georgian War (for which he negotiated a ceasefire), and the Arab Spring (especially in Tunisia, Libya, and Syria). He initiated the reform of French universities (2007) and the pension reform (2010). He married Italian-French singer-songwriter Carla Bruni in 2008 at the Élysée Palace in Paris. In the 2012 presidential election, Sarkozy was defeated by the PS candidate François Hollande by a 3.2% margin. After leaving office, Sarkozy pledged to retire but returned in 2014 as UMP leader (renamed The Republicans in 2015). After defeat in the Republican presidential primary in 2016, he retired from public life.

He was charged with corruption by French prosecutors in two cases, notably concerning the alleged Libyan interference in the 2007 French elections. In 2021, Sarkozy was convicted of corruption in two separate trials, receiving a three-year sentence (two suspended, one in prison, under appeal) and a one-year sentence served under home confinement. He lost an appeal in May 2023. In February 2024, his campaign finance sentence was revised to six months in prison and six months suspended. In September 2025, he was convicted of criminal conspiracy over his "corruption pact" with Muammar Gaddafi and sentenced to five years in prison, plus a €100,000 fine. On 21 October 2025, Sarkozy commenced his sentence at La Santé Prison, in segregation, while lawyers appeal. He was released three weeks into his five year sentence on 10 November. One of the conditions of Sarkozy's release is that he must not make contact with any employees of the justice ministry.

== Personal life ==
=== Family background ===
Nicolas Paul Stéphane Sarközy de Nagy-Bocsa was born on 28 January 1955 in Paris. He is the son of Pál István Ernő Sárközy de Nagy-Bócsa (Note: "Sarkozy" is the westernized, or internationalized, version of his Hungarian name. In Hungarian, the given name comes last rather than first. The French aristocratic particle "de" is also used instead of the Hungarian aristocratic ending "-i". This westernization of Hungarian names is frequent, particularly for people with an aristocratic name. For example, the leader of Hungary from 1920 to 1944, whose Hungarian name is nagybányai Horthy Miklós, is known in English as Miklós Horthy de Nagybánya. The French name of Pál Sárközy de Nagy-Bócsa changed in 1948 to Paul Étienne Arnaud Sarközy de Nagy-Bocsa when Pál was translated as Paul in French. The acute accents on the "a" of Sarközy and the "o" of Bocsa were dropped as these letters never carry an acute accent (accent aigu) in French. The trema on the "o" of Sárközy was kept, probably because French typewriters allow this combination, whereas it is impossible to write "a" or "o" with an acute accent using a French typewriter.) (Hungarian: nagybócsai Sárközy Pál; [ˈnɒɟboːt͡ʃɒi ˈʃaːrkøzi ˈpaːl] —in Hungarian Nagy-Bócsay Sárközy Pál István Ernő; 5 May 1928 – 4 March 2023), a Protestant Hungarian aristocrat, and Andrée Jeanne "Dadu" Mallah (12 October 1925 – 12 December 2017), whose Ottoman Greek Jewish father (Sarkozy's grandfather) converted to Catholicism to marry Sarkozy's French Catholic maternal grandmother. They were married in the Saint-François-de-Sales church, 17th arrondissement of Paris, on 8 February 1950, and divorced in 1959.

=== Early life ===
During Sarkozy's childhood, his father founded his own advertising agency and became wealthy. The family lived in a mansion owned by Sarkozy's maternal grandfather, Benedict Mallah, in the 17th arrondissement of Paris. The family later moved to Neuilly-sur-Seine, one of the wealthiest communes of the Île-de-France région immediately west of Paris. According to Sarkozy, his staunchly Gaullist grandfather was more of an influence on him than his father, whom he rarely saw. Sarkozy was raised Catholic.

Sarkozy said that being kept at a distance by his father shaped much of who he is today. He also has said that, in his early years, he felt inferior to his wealthier and taller classmates. He has spoken about the difficulties he faced as a child of divorced parents at a time when divorce was uncommon. "What made me who I am now is the sum of all the humiliations suffered during childhood", he said later.

=== Education ===
Sarkozy was enrolled in the Lycée Chaptal, a well-regarded public middle and high school in Paris' 8th arrondissement, where he failed his sixième. His family then sent him to the Cours Saint-Louis de Monceau, a private Catholic school in the 17th arrondissement, where he was reportedly a mediocre student, but where he nonetheless obtained his baccalauréat in 1973.

Sarkozy enrolled at the Université Paris X Nanterre, where he graduated with an M.A. in private law and, later, with a D.E.A. degree in business law. Paris X Nanterre had been the starting place for the May '68 student movement and was still a stronghold of leftist students. Described as a quiet student, Sarkozy soon joined the right-wing student organisation, in which he was very active. He completed his military service as a part-time Air Force cleaner.

After graduating from university, Sarkozy entered Sciences Po, where he studied between 1979 and 1981, but failed to graduate due to an insufficient command of the English language.

After passing the bar, Sarkozy became a lawyer specialising in business and family law and was one of Silvio Berlusconi's French lawyers.

=== Marriages ===
==== Marie-Dominique Culioli ====
Sarkozy married his first wife, Marie-Dominique Culioli, on 23 September 1982, with prominent right-wing politician Charles Pasqua serving as best man. (Pasqua later became a political opponent.) Culioli's father was a pharmacist from Vico (a village north of Ajaccio, Corsica); her uncle was Achille Peretti, the mayor of Neuilly-sur-Seine from 1947 to 1983 and Sarkozy's political mentor. They had two sons, Pierre (born in 1985), now a hip-hop producer, and Jean (born in 1986), now a local politician in the city of Neuilly-sur-Seine, where Sarkozy started his own political career. Sarkozy divorced Culioli in 1996, after they had been separated for several years.

==== Cécilia Ciganer-Albéniz ====
As mayor of Neuilly-sur-Seine, Sarkozy met former fashion model and public relations executive Cécilia Ciganer-Albéniz (great-granddaughter of composer Isaac Albéniz and daughter of a Moldovan father), when he officiated at her wedding to television host Jacques Martin. In 1988, she left her husband for Sarkozy, and divorced one year later. She and Sarkozy married in October 1996, with witnesses Martin Bouygues and Bernard Arnault. They have one son, Louis, born 28 April 1997.

Between 2002 and 2005, the couple often appeared together on public occasions, with Cécilia Sarkozy acting as the chief aide for her husband. On 25 May 2005, however, the Swiss newspaper Le Matin revealed that she had left Sarkozy for Moroccan national Richard Attias, head of Publicis in New York. There were other accusations of a private nature in Le Matin, which led to Sarkozy suing the paper. In the meantime, he was said to have had an affair with a journalist of Le Figaro, Anne Fulda.

Sarkozy and Cécilia ultimately divorced on 15 October 2007, soon after his election as president.

==== Carla Bruni ====
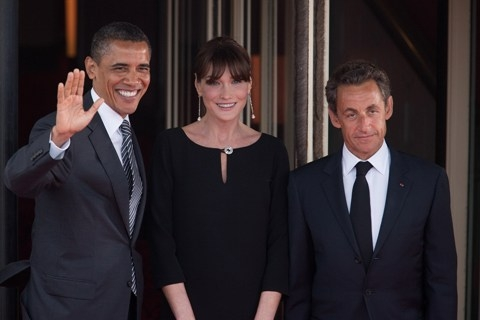
Sarkozy and his wife Carla Bruni greet President Barack Obama at the G8 Summit dinner in Deauville, France, 26 May 2011.

Less than a month after separating from Cécilia, Sarkozy met Italian-born singer, songwriter and former fashion model Carla Bruni at a dinner party, and soon entered into a relationship with her. They married on 2 February 2008 at the Élysée Palace in Paris.

The couple have a daughter, Giulia, born on 19 October 2011. It was the first time a French president has publicly had a child while in office.

=== Personal wealth ===
Sarkozy declared to the Constitutional Council a net worth of €2 million, most of the assets being in the form of life insurance policies. As the French President, one of his first actions was to give himself a pay raise: his yearly salary went from €101,000 to €240,000, matching other European officeholders. He is also entitled to a mayoral, parliamentarian and presidential pension as a former Mayor of Neuilly-sur-Seine, member of the National Assembly and President of France.

== Early political career ==
Sarkozy is recognised by French parties on both the Right and Left as a skilled politician and striking orator. His supporters within France emphasize his charisma, political innovation and willingness to "make a dramatic break" amid mounting disaffection against "politics as usual". Overall, he is considered more pro-American and pro-Israeli than most French politicians.

From 2004 to 2007, Sarkozy was president of the Union pour un Mouvement Populaire (UMP), France's major right-wing political party, and he was Minister of the Interior in the government of Prime Minister Dominique de Villepin, with the honorific title of Minister of State, making him effectively the number three official in the French State after President Jacques Chirac and Villepin. His ministerial responsibilities included law enforcement and working to co-ordinate relationships between the national and local governments, as well as Minister of Worship: in this role he created the French Council of the Muslim Faith (CFCM). Previously, he was a député in the French National Assembly. He was forced to resign this position in order to accept his ministerial appointment. He previously also held several ministerial posts, including Finance Minister.

=== In Government: 1993–1995 ===
Sarkozy's political career began when he was 23, when he became a city councillor in Neuilly-sur-Seine. A member of the Neo-Gaullist party RPR, he went on to be elected mayor of that town, after the death of the incumbent mayor Achille Peretti. Sarkozy had been close to Peretti, as his mother was Peretti's secretary. A more senior RPR councillor, Charles Pasqua, wanted to become mayor, and asked Sarkozy to organize his campaign. Instead, Sarkozy took that opportunity to propel himself into the office of mayor. He was the youngest mayor of any town in France with a population of over 50,000. He served from 1983 to 2002. In 1988, he became a deputy in the National Assembly.

In 1993, Nicolas Sarkozy was in the national news for personally negotiating with the "Human Bomb", a man who had taken small children hostages in a kindergarten in Neuilly. The "Human Bomb" was killed after two days of talks by policemen of the RAID, who entered the school stealthily while the attacker was resting.

At the same time, from 1993 to 1995, he was Minister for the Budget and spokesman for the executive in the cabinet of Prime Minister Édouard Balladur. Throughout most of his early career, Sarkozy had been seen as a protégé of Jacques Chirac. During his tenure, he increased France's public debt more than any other French Budget Minister, by the equivalent of €200 billion (US$260 billion) (FY 1994–1996). The first two budgets he submitted to the parliament (budgets for FY1994 and FY1995) assumed a yearly budget deficit equivalent to six percent of GDP. (Note: See also Dette publique de la France (in French)) According to the Maastricht Treaty, the French yearly budget deficit may not exceed three percent of France's GDP.

In 1995, he spurned Chirac and backed Édouard Balladur for President of France. After Chirac won the election, Sarkozy lost his position as Minister for the Budget, and found himself outside the circles of power.

However, he returned after the right-wing defeat at the 1997 parliamentary election, as the number two candidate of the RPR. When the party leader Philippe Séguin resigned, in 1999, he took the leadership of the Neo-Gaullist party. But it obtained its worst result at the 1999 European Parliament election, winning 12.7% of the votes, less than the dissident Rally for France of Charles Pasqua. Sarkozy lost the RPR leadership.

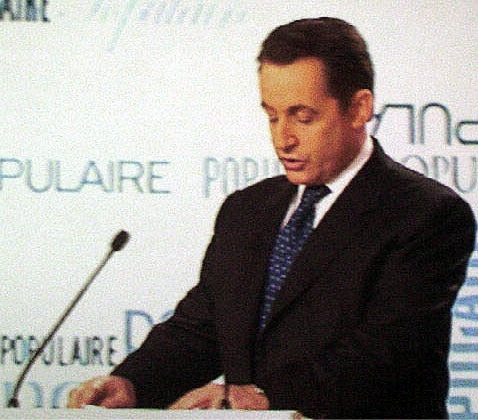
Sarkozy speaking at the congress of his party, 28 November 2004

In 2002, however, after his re-election as President of the French Republic (see 2002 French presidential election), Chirac appointed Sarkozy as minister of the interior in the cabinet of Prime Minister Jean-Pierre Raffarin, despite Sarkozy's support of Edouard Balladur for president in 1995. Following Chirac's 14 July keynote speech on road safety, Sarkozy as Minister of the Interior pushed through new legislation leading to the mass purchase of speed cameras and a campaign to increase the awareness of dangers on the roads.

In the cabinet reshuffle of 30 April 2004, Sarkozy became finance minister. Tensions continued to build between Sarkozy and Chirac and within the UMP party, as Sarkozy's intentions of becoming head of the party after the resignation of Alain Juppé became clear.

In party elections of 10 November 2004, Sarkozy became leader of the UMP with 85% of the vote. In accordance with an agreement with Chirac, he resigned as finance minister. Sarkozy's ascent was marked by the division of UMP between sarkozystes, such as Sarkozy's "first lieutenant", Brice Hortefeux, and Chirac loyalists, such as Jean-Louis Debré.

Sarkozy was made Chevalier de la Légion d'honneur (Knight of the Legion of Honour) by President Chirac in February 2005. He was re-elected on 13 March 2005 to the National Assembly. (As required by the constitution, he had to resign as a deputy when he became minister in 2002.)

On 31 May 2005, the main French news radio station France Info reported a rumour that Sarkozy was to be reappointed minister of the interior in the government of Dominique de Villepin without resigning from the UMP leadership. This was confirmed on 2 June 2005, when the members of the government were officially announced.

=== First term as minister of the interior: 2002–2004 ===
Towards the end of his first term as minister of the interior, in 2004, Sarkozy was the most divisive conservative politician in France, according to polls conducted at the beginning of 2004.

Sarkozy has sought to ease the sometimes tense relationships between the general French population and the Muslim community. Unlike the Catholic Church in France with its official leaders or Protestants with their umbrella organisations, the French Muslim community had a lack of structure with no group that could legitimately deal with the French government on their behalf. Sarkozy supported the foundation in May 2003 of the private non-profit Conseil français du culte musulman ("French Council of the Muslim Faith"), an organisation meant to be representative of French Muslims. In addition, Sarkozy has suggested amending the 1905 law on the separation of Church and State, mostly in order to be able to finance mosques and other Muslim institutions with public funds so that they are less reliant on money from outside France. It was not followed by any concrete measure.

=== Minister of finance: 2004 ===
During his short appointment as Minister of Finance, Sarkozy was responsible for introducing a number of policies. The degree to which this reflected libéralisme (a hands-off approach to running the economy) or more traditional French state dirigisme (intervention) is controversial. He resigned the day following his election as president of the UMP.

- In September 2004, Sarkozy oversaw the reduction of the government ownership stake in France Télécom from 50.4 per cent to 41 per cent.
- Sarkozy backed a partial nationalisation of the large engineering company Alstom decided by his predecessor when the company was exposed to bankruptcy in 2003.
- In June 2004, Sarkozy reached an agreement with the major retail chains in France to concertedly lower prices on household goods by an average of two percent; the success of this measure is disputed, with studies suggesting that the decrease was close to one percent in September.
- Taxes: Sarkozy avoided taking a position on the ISF (solidarity tax on wealth). This is considered an ideological symbol by many on the left and right. Some in the business world and on the liberal right, such as Alain Madelin, wanted it abolished. For Sarkozy, that would have risked being categorised by the left as a gift to the richest classes of society at a time of economic difficulties.

=== Second term as minister of the interior: 2005–2007 ===
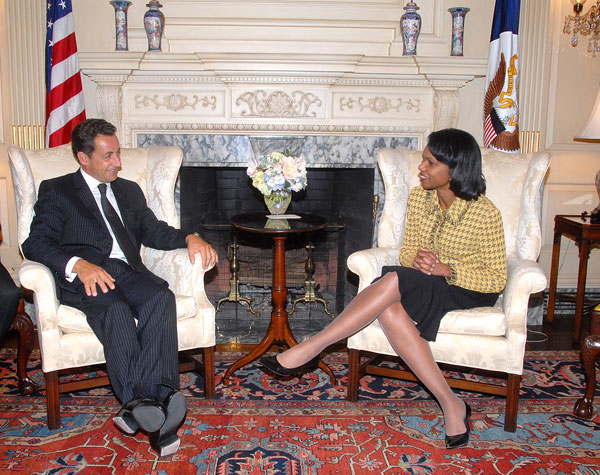
Sarkozy as Minister of the Interior with U.S. Secretary of State Condoleezza Rice, after their bilateral meeting in Washington, D.C., 12 September 2006

During his second term at the Ministry of the Interior, Sarkozy was initially more discreet about his ministerial activities: instead of focusing on his own topic of law and order, many of his declarations addressed wider issues, since he was expressing his opinions as head of the UMP party.

However, the civil unrest in autumn 2005 put law enforcement in the spotlight again. Sarkozy was accused of having provoked the unrest by calling young delinquents from housing projects a "rabble" ("racaille") in Argenteuil near Paris, and controversially suggested cleansing the minority suburbs with a Kärcher. After the accidental death of two youths, which sparked the riots, Sarkozy first blamed it on "hoodlums" and gangsters. These remarks were sharply criticised by many on the left wing and by a member of his own government, Delegate Minister for Equal Opportunities Azouz Begag.

After the rioting, he made a number of announcements on future policy: selection of immigrants, greater tracking of immigrants, and a reform of the 1945 ordinance government justice measures for young delinquents.

=== UMP leader: 2004–2007 ===
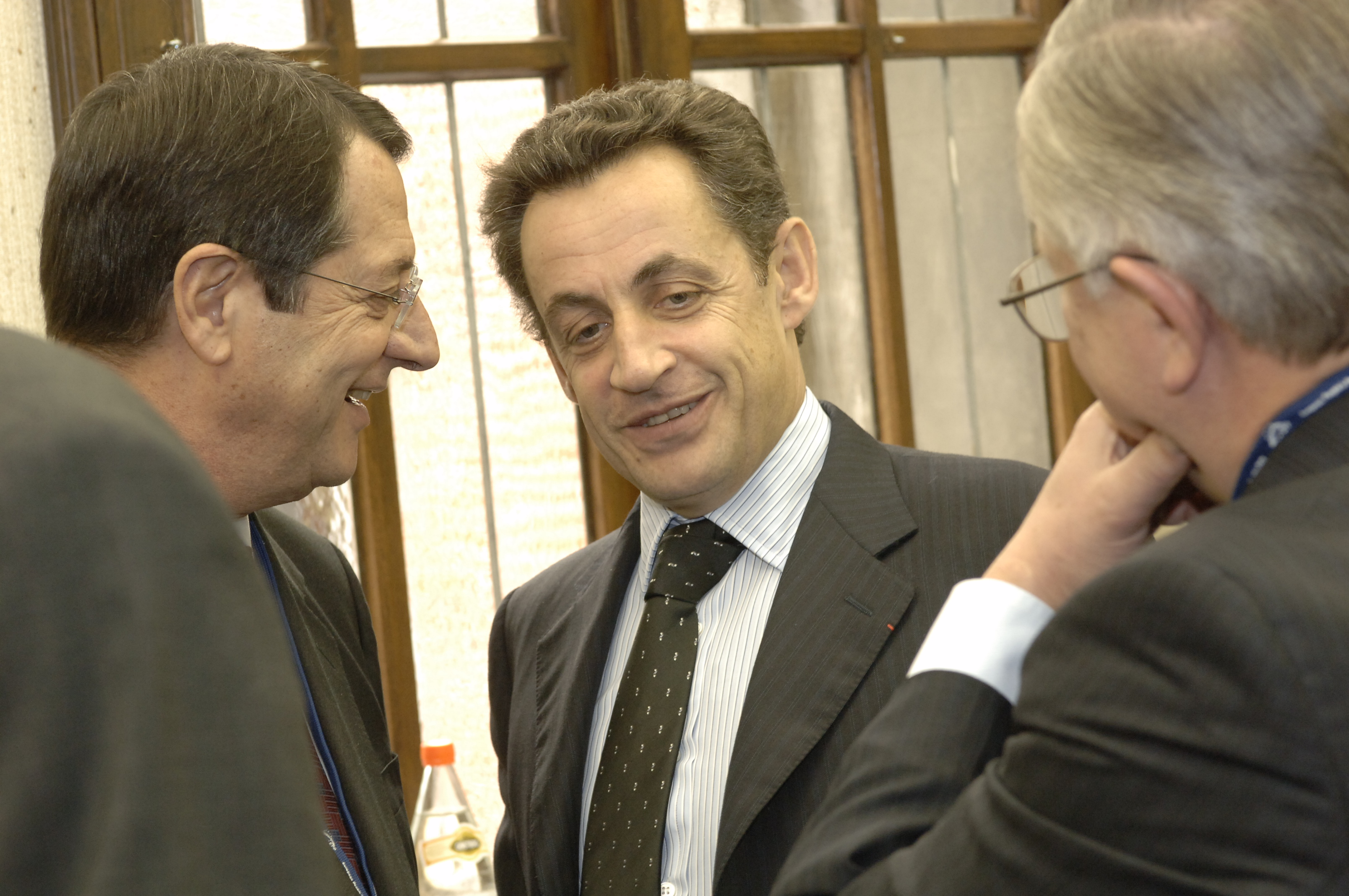
Nicolas Sarkozy in 2006 with Cypriot opposition leader Nicos Anastasiades

Before he was elected President of France, Sarkozy was president of UMP, the French conservative party, elected with 85 per cent of the vote. During his presidency, the number of members increased significantly. In 2005, he supported a "yes" vote in the French referendum on the European Constitution, but the "No" vote won.

Throughout 2005, Sarkozy called for radical changes in France's economic and social policies. These calls culminated in an interview with Le Monde on 8 September 2005, during which he claimed that the French had been misled for 30 years by false promises. Among other issues:

- he called for a simplified and "fairer" taxation system, with fewer loopholes and a maximum taxation rate (all direct taxes combined) at 50 per cent of revenue;
- he approved measures reducing or denying social support to unemployed workers who refuse work offered to them;
- he pressed for a reduction in the budget deficit, claiming that the French state had been living off credit for some time.

Such policies are what are called in France libéral (that is, in favour of laissez-faire economic policies) or, with a pejorative undertone, ultra-libéral. Sarkozy rejects this label of libéral and prefers to call himself a pragmatist.

Sarkozy opened another avenue of controversy by declaring that he wanted a reform of the immigration system, with quotas designed to admit the skilled workers needed by the French economy. He also wanted to reform the current French system for foreign students, saying that it enabled foreign students to take open-ended curricula in order to obtain residency in France; instead, he wanted to select the best students for the best curricula in France.

In early 2006, the French parliament adopted a controversial bill known as DADVSI, which reforms French copyright law. Since his party was divided on the issue, Sarkozy stepped in and organised meetings between various parties involved. Later, groups such as the Odebi League and EUCD.info alleged that Sarkozy personally and unofficially supported certain amendments to the law, which enacted strong penalties against designers of peer-to-peer systems.

=== Presidential election: 2007 ===
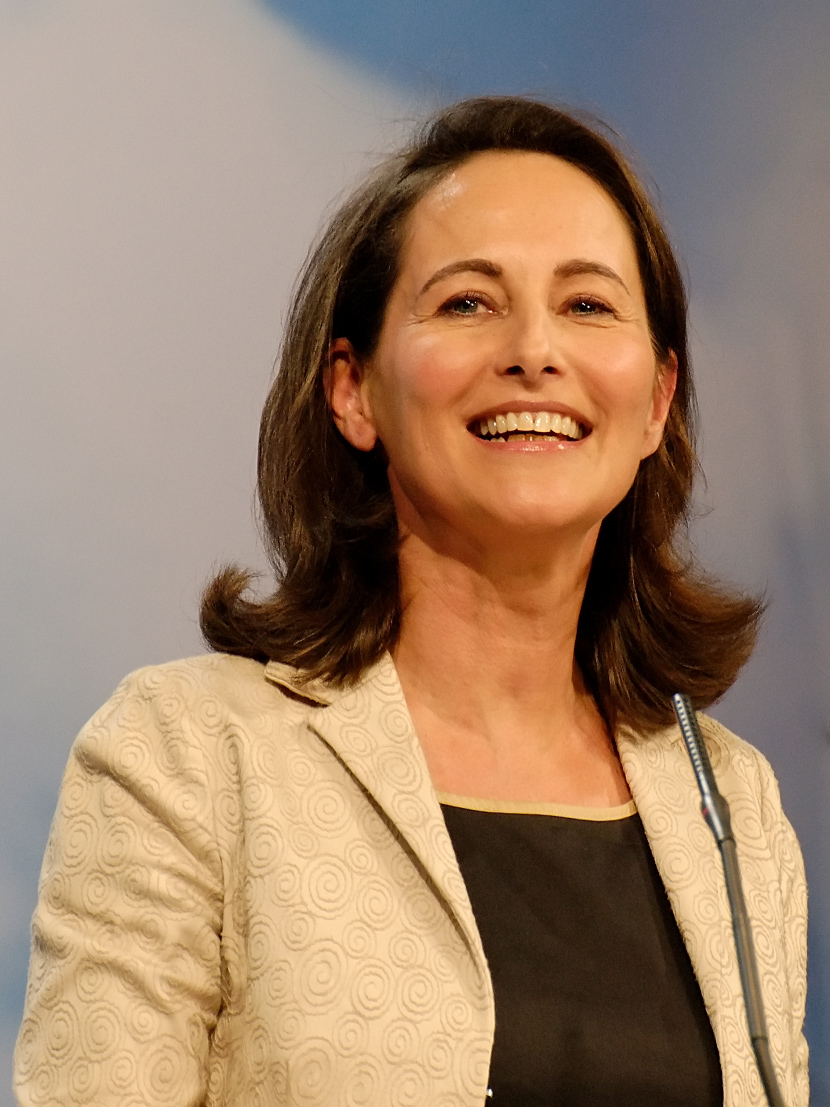
Ségolène Royal was Sarkozy's final opponent during the 2007 campaign.

Sarkozy was a likely candidate for the presidency in 2007; in an oft-repeated comment made on television channel France 2, when asked by a journalist whether he thought about the presidential election when he shaved in the morning, Sarkozy commented, "Not just when I shave".

On 14 January 2007, Sarkozy was chosen by the UMP to be its candidate in the 2007 presidential election. Sarkozy, who was running unopposed, won 98 percent of the votes. Of the 327,000 UMP members who could vote, 69 per cent participated in the online ballot.

In February 2007, Sarkozy appeared on a televised debate on TF1 where he expressed his support for affirmative action and the freedom to work overtime. Despite his opposition to same-sex marriage, he advocated civil unions and the possibility for same-sex partners to inherit under the same regime as married couples. The law was voted in July 2007. (Note: It was included in the paquet fiscal that has been one of the first laws passed in Parliament.)

On 7 February, Sarkozy decided in favour of a projected second, non-nuclear, aircraft carrier for the national Navy (adding to the nuclear Charles de Gaulle), during an official visit in Toulon with Defence Minister Michèle Alliot-Marie. "This would allow permanently having an operational ship, taking into account the constraints of maintenance", he explained.

On 21 March, President Jacques Chirac announced his support for Sarkozy. Chirac pointed out that Sarkozy had been chosen as presidential candidate for the ruling UMP party, and said: "So it is totally natural that I give him my vote and my support." To focus on his campaign, Sarkozy stepped down as minister of the interior on 26 March.

During the campaign, rival candidates had accused Sarkozy of being a "candidate for brutality" and of presenting hard-line views about France's future. Opponents also accused him of courting conservative voters in policy-making in a bid to capitalise on right-wing sentiments among some communities. However, his popularity was sufficient to see him polling as the frontrunner throughout the later campaign period, consistently ahead of rival Socialist candidate, Ségolène Royal.

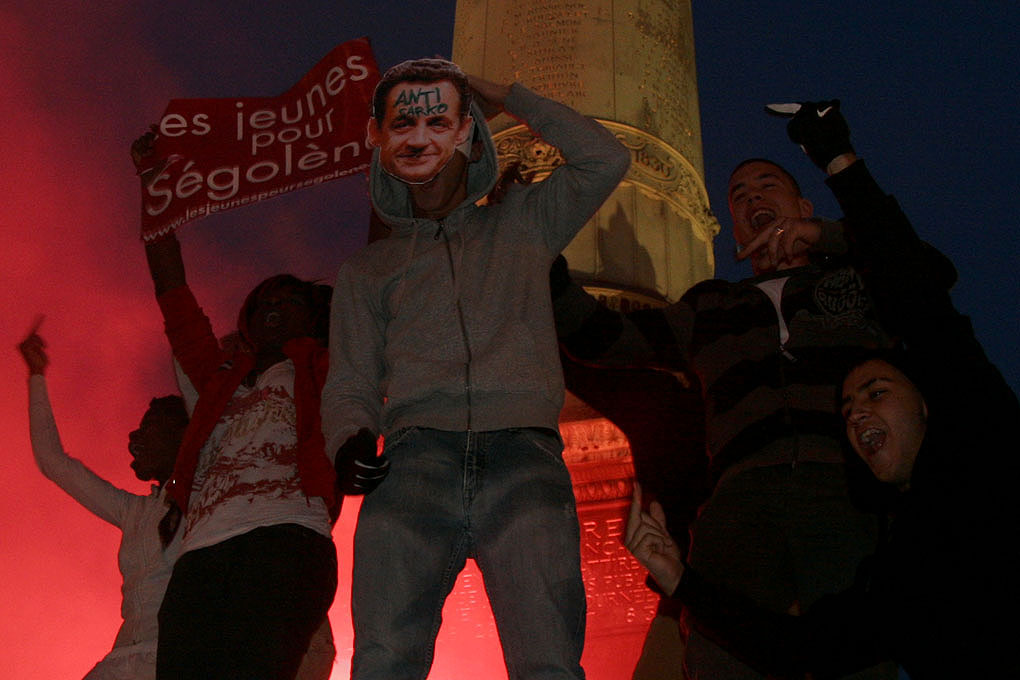
Demonstrations in Paris, 6 May 2007, following the election of Nicolas Sarkozy

The first round of the presidential election was held on 22 April 2007. Sarkozy came in first with 31.18 per cent of the votes, ahead of Ségolène Royal of the Socialists with 25.87 percent. In the second round, Sarkozy came out on top to win the election with 53.06 per cent of the votes ahead of Ségolène Royal with 46.94 per cent. In his speech immediately following the announcement of the election results, Sarkozy stressed the need for France's modernisation, but also called for national unity, mentioning that Royal was in his thoughts. In that speech, he claimed "The French have chosen to break with the ideas, habits and behaviour of the past. I will restore the value of work, authority, merit and respect for the nation."

== Presidency of France (2007–2012) ==
=== Inauguration ===
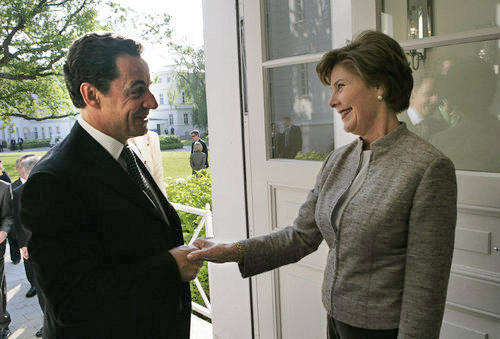
Sarkozy greets U.S. First Lady Laura Bush in Germany, June 2007.

On 6 May 2007, Nicolas Sarkozy became the sixth person to be elected President of the Fifth Republic (which was established in 1958), and the 23rd President in French history.

The official transfer of power from Chirac to Sarkozy took place on 16 May at 11:00 am (9:00 UTC) at the Élysée Palace, where he was given the authorization codes of the French nuclear arsenal. In the afternoon, the new president flew to Berlin to meet with German Chancellor Angela Merkel.

Under Sarkozy's government, François Fillon replaced Dominique de Villepin as prime minister. Sarkozy appointed Bernard Kouchner, the left-wing founder of Médecins Sans Frontières, as his foreign minister, leading to Kouchner's expulsion from the Socialist Party. In addition to Kouchner, three more Sarkozy ministers are from the left, including Éric Besson, who served as Ségolène Royal's economic adviser at the beginning of her campaign. Sarkozy also appointed seven women to form a total cabinet of 15; one, Justice Minister Rachida Dati, is the first woman of Northern African origin to serve in a French cabinet. Of the 15, two attended the elite École nationale d'administration (ENA). The ministers were reorganised, with the controversial creation of a 'Ministry of Immigration, Integration, National Identity and Co-Development'—given to his right-hand man Brice Hortefeux—and of a 'Ministry of Budget, Public Accounts and Civil Administration'—handed out to Éric Wœrth, supposed to prepare the replacement of only a third of all civil servants who retire. However, after the 17 June parliamentary elections, the Cabinet was adjusted to 15 ministers and 16 deputy ministers, totalling 31 officials.

Sarkozy broke with the custom of amnestying traffic tickets and of releasing thousands of prisoners from overcrowded jails on Bastille Day, a tradition that Napoleon had started in 1802 to commemorate the storming of the Bastille during the French Revolution.

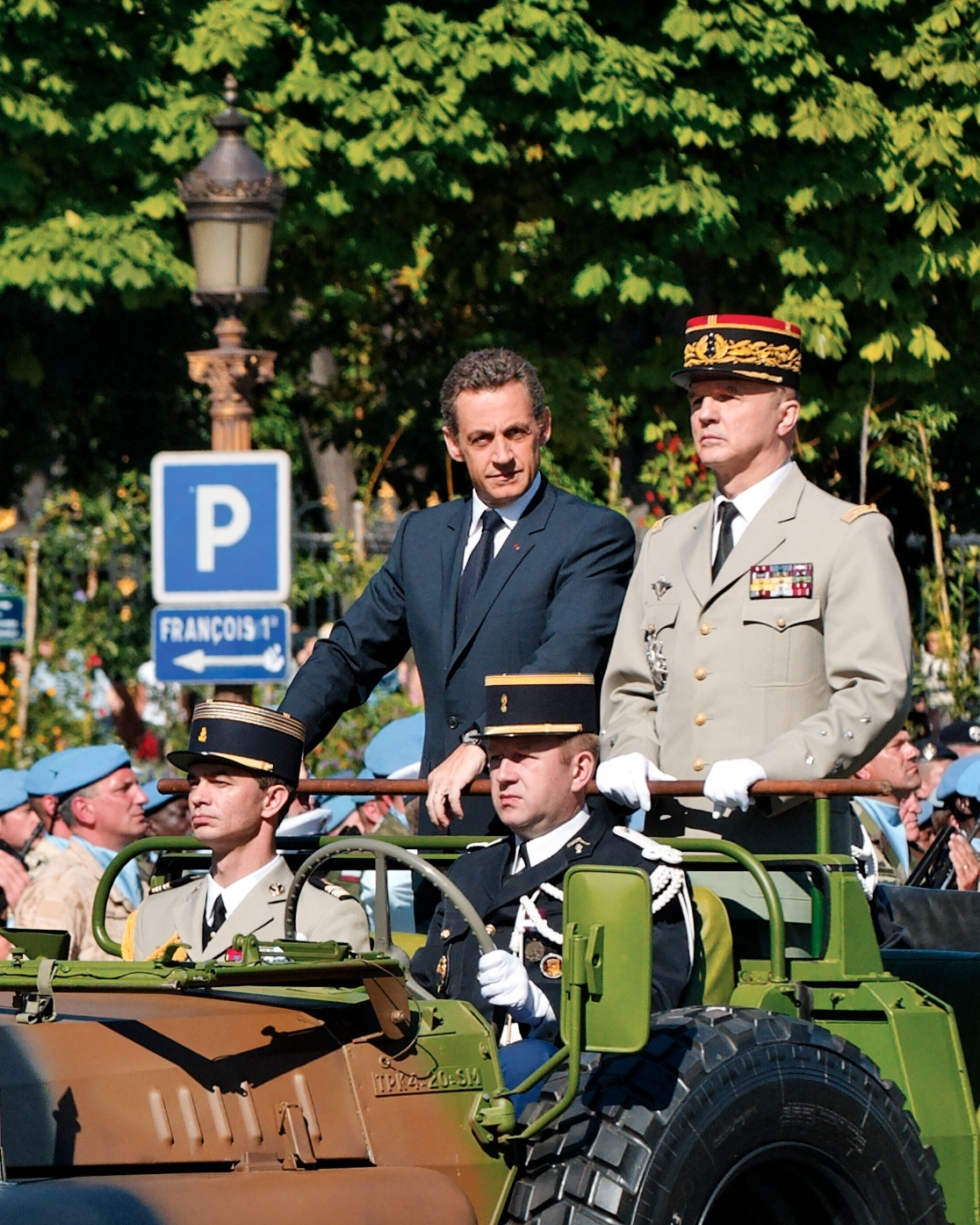
Nicolas Sarkozy and General Jean-Louis Georgelin, Chief of the Defence Staff, reviewing troops during the Bastille Day 2008 military parade on the Champs-Élysées, Paris

In 2007 and 2008, French President Nicolas Sarkozy, Canadian Prime Minister Stephen Harper, and Quebec Premier Jean Charest all spoke in favour of a Canada – EU free trade agreement. In October 2008, Sarkozy became the first French President to address the National Assembly of Quebec. In his speech, he spoke out against Quebec separatism, but recognised Quebec as a nation within Canada. He said that, to France, Canada was a friend, and Quebec was family.

=== Release of hostages ===
Shortly after taking office, Sarkozy began negotiations with Colombian president Álvaro Uribe and the left-wing guerrilla FARC, regarding the release of hostages held by the rebel group, especially Franco-Colombian politician Ingrid Betancourt. According to some sources, Sarkozy himself asked for Uribe to release FARC's "chancellor" Rodrigo Granda.

Furthermore, he announced on 24 July 2007, that French and European representatives had obtained the extradition of the Bulgarian nurses detained in Libya to their country. In exchange, he signed with Muammar Gaddafi security, health care and immigration pacts—and a $230 million (168 million euros) MILAN antitank missile sale. The contract was the first made by Libya since 2004, and was negotiated with MBDA, a subsidiary of EADS. Another 128 million euro contract would have been signed, according to Tripoli, with EADS for a TETRA radio system. The Socialist Party (PS) and the Communist Party (PCF) criticised a "state affair" and a "barter" with a "Rogue state". The leader of the PS, François Hollande, requested the opening of a parliamentary investigation.

=== Green policy ===
On 8 June 2007, during the 33rd G8 summit in Heiligendamm, Sarkozy set a goal of reducing French CO_{2} emissions by 50 percent by 2050 in order to prevent global warming. He then pushed forward Socialist Dominique Strauss-Kahn as European nominee to the International Monetary Fund (IMF). Critics alleged that Sarkozy proposed to nominate Strauss-Kahn as managing director of the IMF to deprive the Socialist Party of one of its more popular figures.

In 2010, a study of Yale and Columbia universities ranked France the most respectful country of the G20 concerning the environment.

=== Economic policy ===
The Union for a Popular Movement (UMP), Sarkozy's party, won a majority at the June 2007 legislative election, although by less than expected. In July, the UMP majority, seconded by the Nouveau Centre, ratified one of Sarkozy's electoral promises, which was to partially revoke the inheritance tax. The inheritance tax formerly provided €8 billion in revenue.

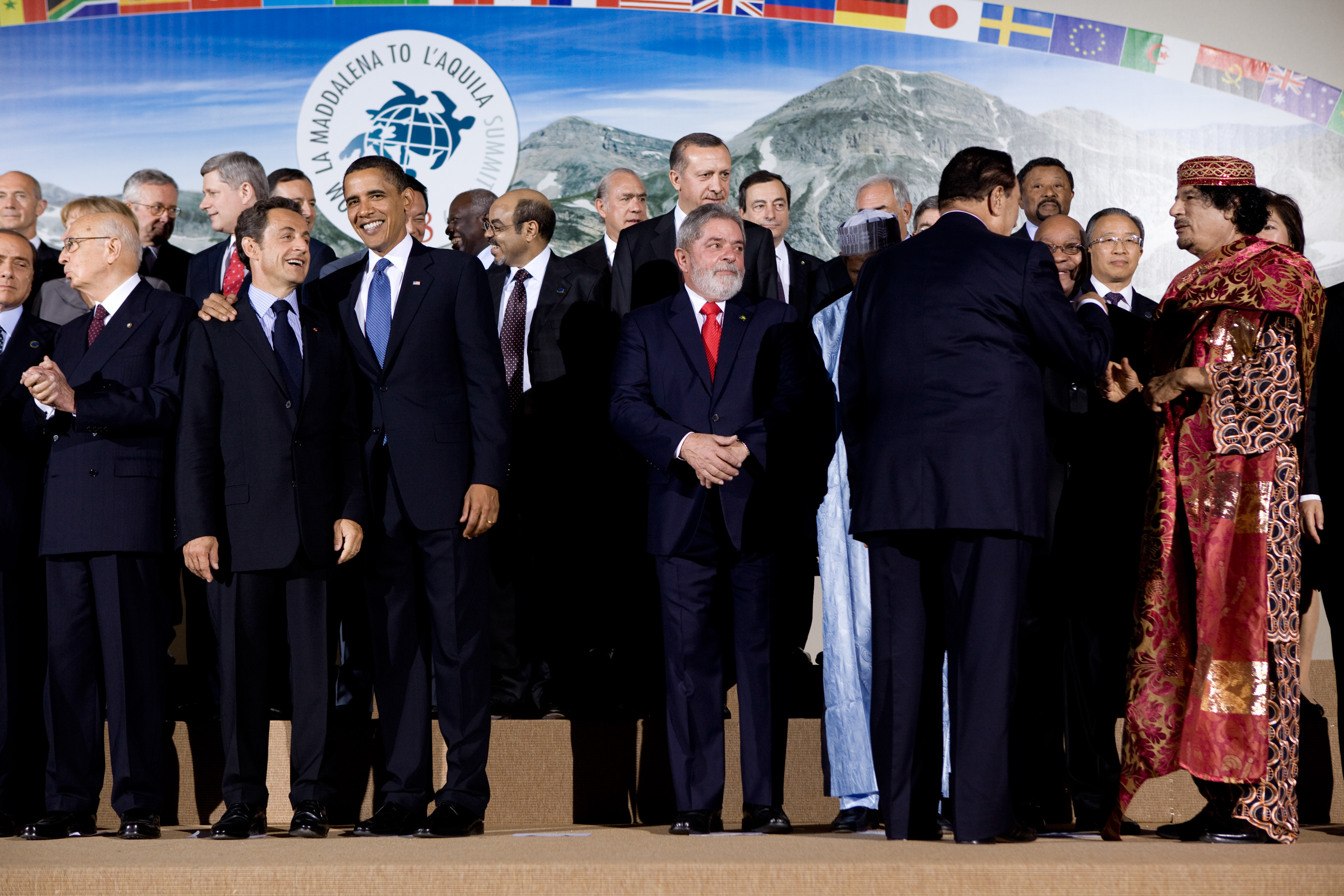
Sarkozy (at left) attending the G-8 Summit in 2009

Sarkozy's UMP majority prepared a budget that reduced taxes, in particular for upper middle-class people, supposedly in an effort to boost GDP growth, but did not reduce state expenditures. He was criticised by the European Commission for doing so.

On 23 July 2008, parliament voted the "loi de modernisation de l'économie" (Modernization of the Economy Law), which loosened restrictions on retail prices and reduced limitations on the creation of businesses. The Government also made changes to long-standing French work-hour regulations, allowing employers to negotiate overtime with employees and making all hours worked past the traditional French 35-hour week tax-free.

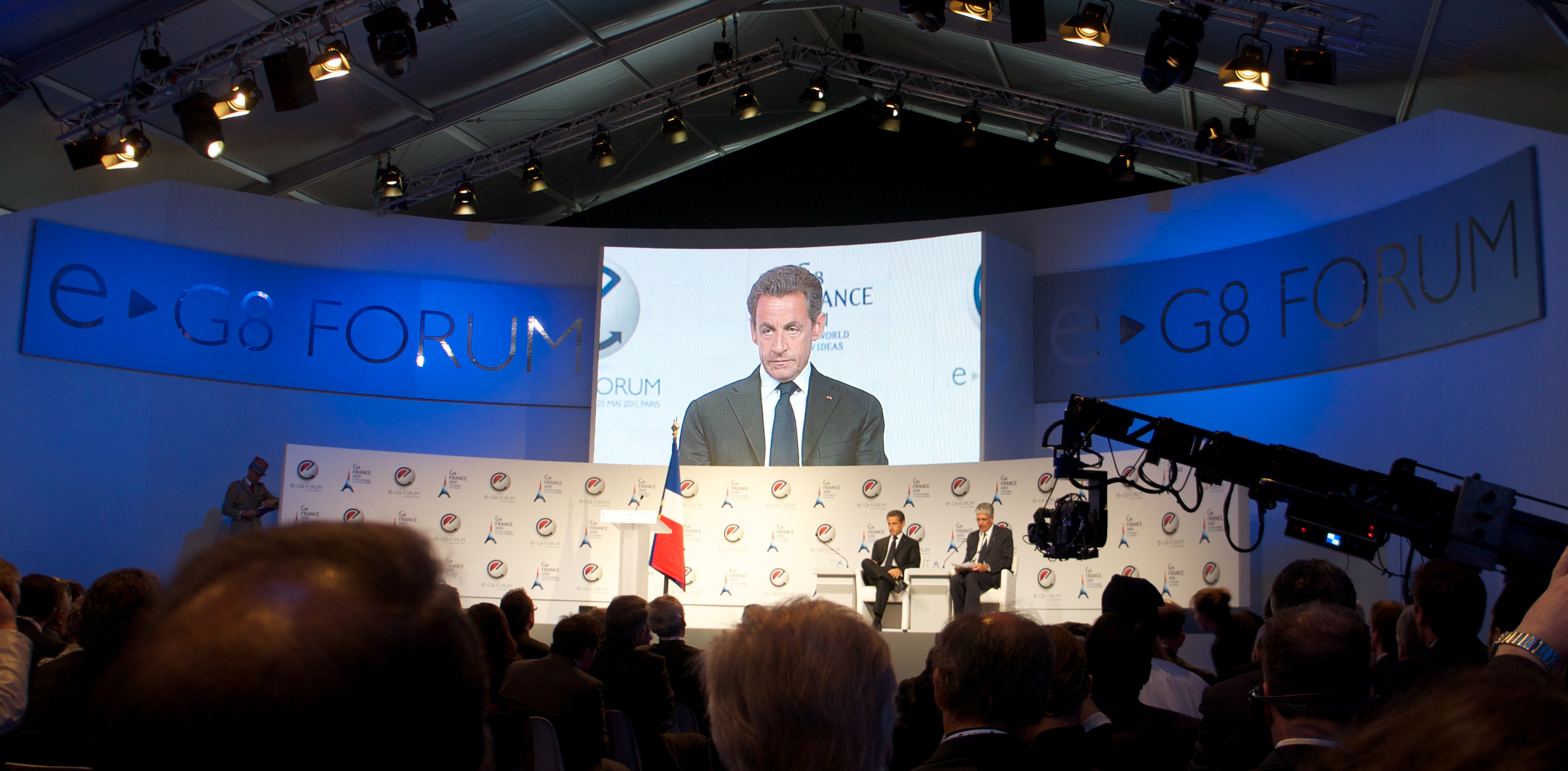
Nicolas Sarkozy addresses the E-G8 Forum in Paris in 2011.

However, as a result of the 2008 financial crisis, Sarkozy returned to the state interventionism of his predecessors, declaring that "laissez-faire capitalism is over" and denouncing the "dictatorship of the market". Confronted with the suggestion that he had become a socialist, he responded: "Have I become socialist? Perhaps." He also pledged to create 100,000 state-subsidised jobs.

=== Security policy ===
Sarkozy's government issued a decree on 7 August 2007 to generalise a voluntary biometric profiling program of travellers in airports. The program, called 'Parafes', was to use fingerprints. The new database would be interconnected with the Schengen Information System (SIS) as well as with a national database of wanted persons (FPR). The Commission nationale de l'informatique et des libertés (CNIL) protested against this new decree, opposing itself to the recording of fingerprints and to the interconnection between the SIS and the FPR.

=== Constitutional reform ===
On 21 July 2008, the French parliament passed constitutional reforms, which Sarkozy had made one of the key pledges of his presidential campaign. The vote was 539 to 357, one vote over the three-fifths majority required; the changes are not yet finalised. They would introduce a two-term limit for the presidency, and end the president's right of collective pardon. They would allow the president to address parliament in session, and parliament to set its own agenda. They would give parliament a veto over some presidential appointments, while ending government control over parliament's committee system. He claimed that these reforms strengthen parliament, while some opposition socialist lawmakers described it as a "consolidation of a monocracy".

=== International affairs ===
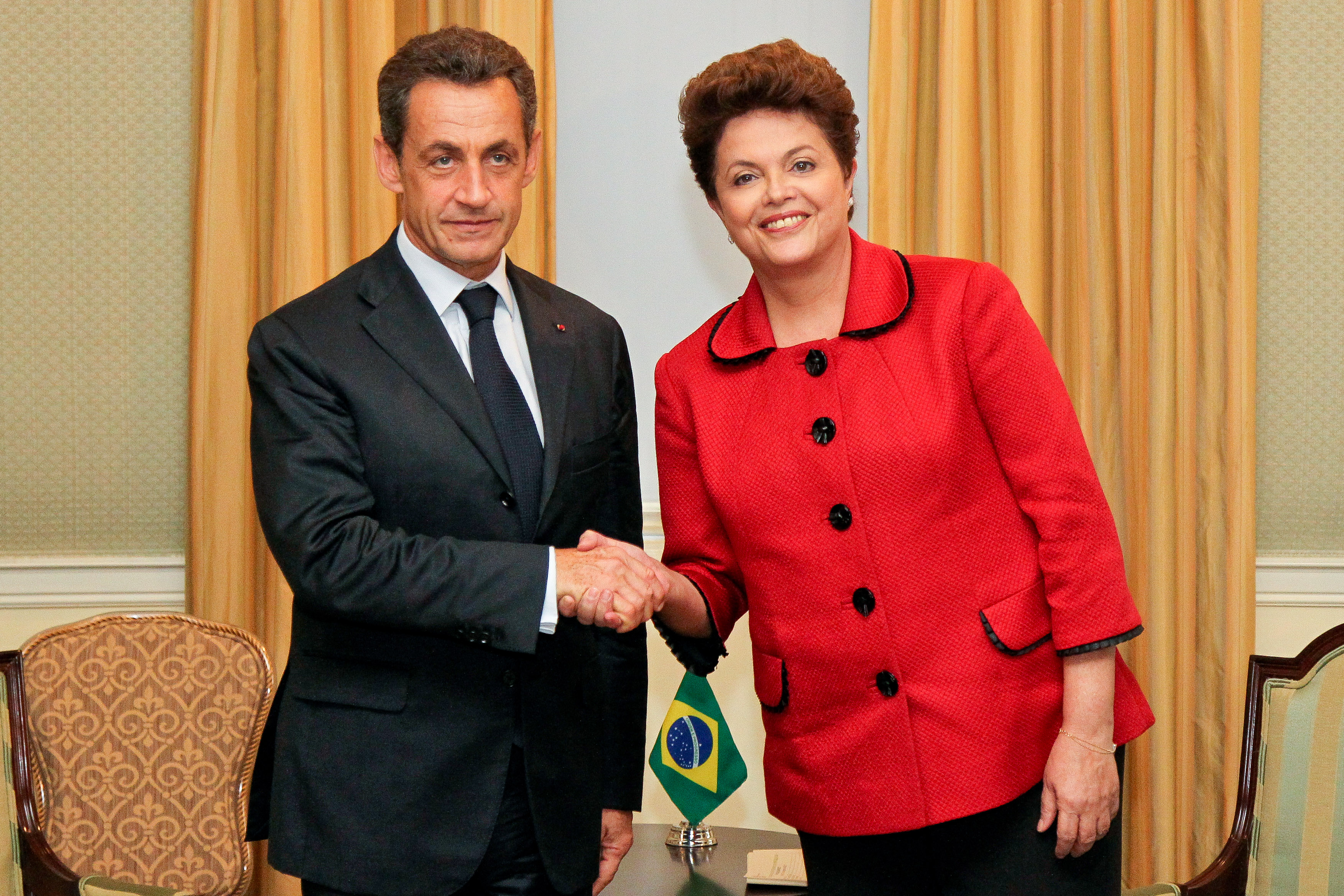
President Nicolas Sarkozy with President of Brazil Dilma Rousseff

During his 2007 presidential campaign, Sarkozy promised a strengthening of the entente cordiale with the United Kingdom and closer cooperation with the United States. Despite this, Sarkozy opposed George W. Bush in granting membership in NATO for Ukraine and Georgia during the organization's Bucharest summit in April 2008, forming a common front with Germany's chancellor Angela Merkel and foreign minister Frank-Walter Steinmeier.

Sarkozy wielded special international power when France held the rotating EU Council Presidency from July through December 2008. Sarkozy publicly stated his intention to attain EU approval of a progressive energy package before the end of his EU Presidency. This energy package would clearly define climate change objectives for the EU and hold members to specific reductions in emissions. In further support of his collaborative outlook on climate change, Sarkozy led the EU into a partnership with China. On 6 December 2008, Nicolas Sarkozy, as part of France's then presidency of the Council of the EU, met the Dalai Lama in Poland and outraged China, which announced that it would postpone the China-EU summit indefinitely.

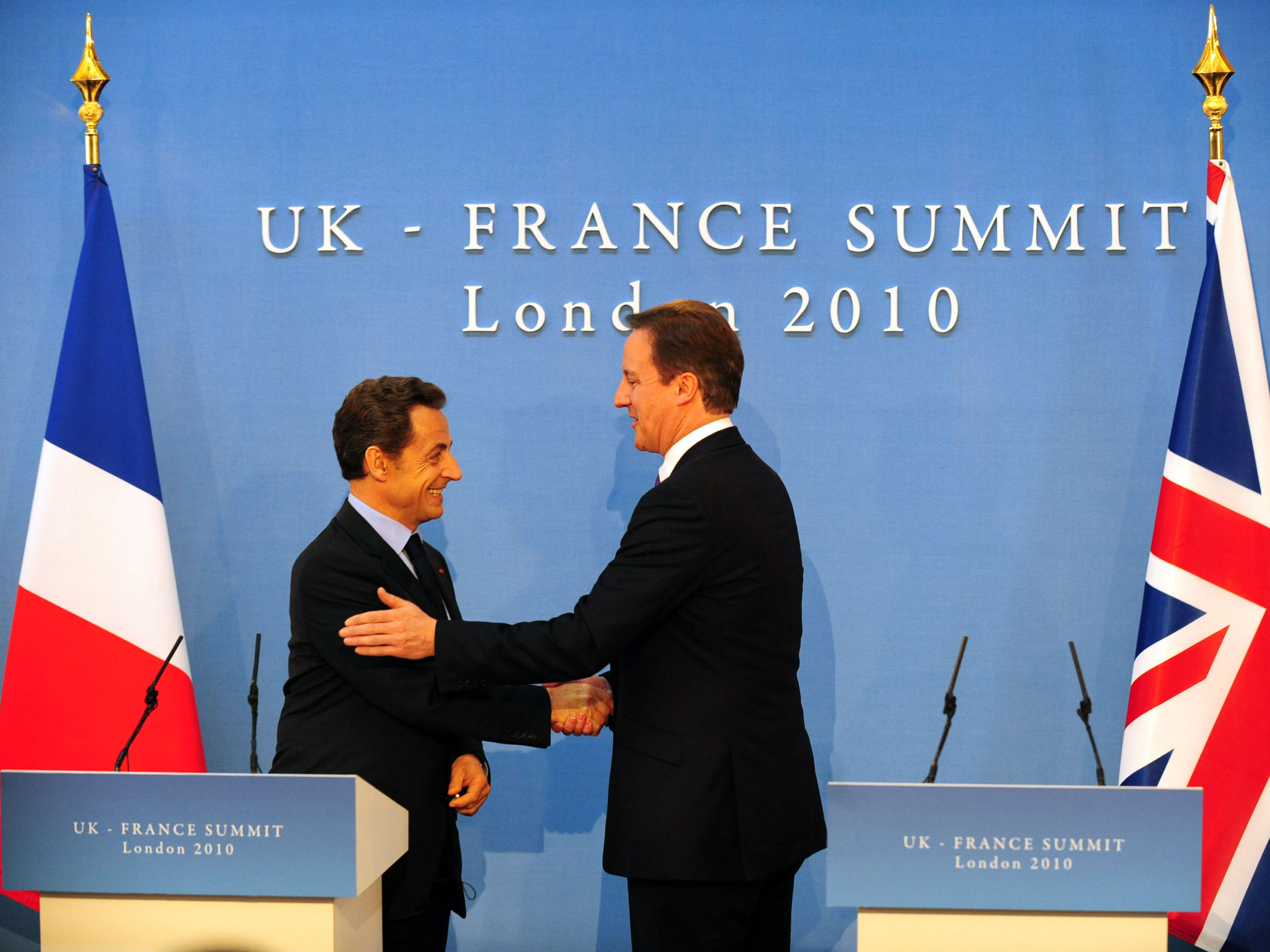
Sarkozy with British Prime Minister David Cameron, November 2010

On 3 April 2009, at the NATO Summit in Strasbourg, Sarkozy announced that France would offer asylum to a former Guantanamo captive. Sarkozy warned that "We are on the path to failure if we continue to act as we have" at the U.N. Climate Summit on 22 September 2009.

On 5 January 2009, Sarkozy called for a ceasefire plan for the Gaza Strip Conflict. The plan, which was jointly proposed by Sarkozy and Egyptian ex-President Hosni Mubarak, envisioned the continuation of the delivery of aid to Gaza and talks with Israel on border security, a key issue for Israel as it says Hamas smuggles its rockets into Gaza through the Egyptian border. Welcoming the proposal, US Secretary of State Condoleezza Rice called for a "ceasefire that can endure and that can bring real security".

=== Military intervention in Libya ===
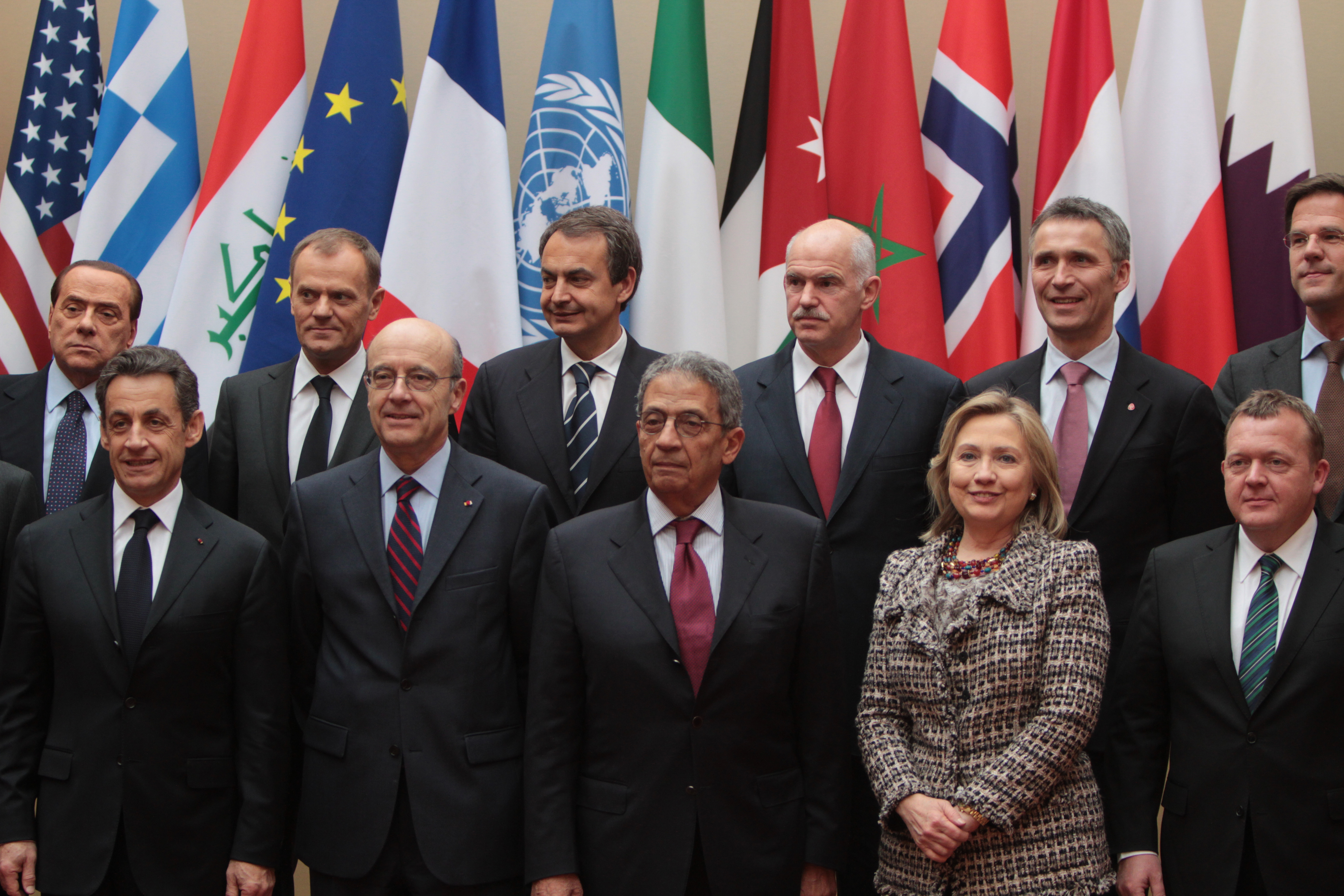
Sarkozy at the Paris Summit of 19 March 2011, which marked the start of a military intervention in Libya

Muammar Gaddafi's official visit to Nicolas Sarkozy in December 2007 triggered a strong wave of protests against the President in France.

In March 2011, after having been criticized for his unwillingness to support the Egyptian and Tunisian revolutions, and persuaded by the philosopher Bernard-Henri Levy to have France actively engage against the forces of the Libyan leader, Muammar Gaddafi, Sarkozy was amongst the first Heads of State to demand the resignation of Gaddafi and his government, which was then fighting a civil war in Libya. On 10 March 2011, Sarkozy welcomed to the Elysée Palace three emissaries from the Libyan National Transitional Council (NTC), brought to him by Bernard-Henri Levy, who mediated at the meeting. Sarkozy promised them that a no-fly zone would be imposed on Gaddafi's aeroplanes. He also promised them French military assistance. On 17 March 2011, at the behest of France, resolution 1973 was adopted by the Security Council of the United Nations, permitting the creation of a "no fly" zone over Libya, and for the undertaking of "necessary measures" for the protection of the country's civilian population.

On 19 March 2011, Sarkozy officially announced the beginning of a military intervention in Libya, with France's participation. These actions of Sarkozy were favorably received by the majority of the French political class and public opinion.

Popularity polls during his presidency

In 2016, the Foreign Affairs Committee of the British Parliament published a report stating that the military intervention "was based on erroneous assumptions" that the threat of a massacre of civilian populations has been "overvalued" and that the coalition "Has not verified the real threat to civilians"; He also believes that the true motivations of Nicolas Sarkozy were to serve French interests and to "improve his political situation in France".

=== 2012 presidential campaign ===
Sarkozy was one of ten candidates who qualified for the first round of voting. François Hollande, the Socialist Party candidate, received the most votes in the first round held on 22 April election, with Sarkozy coming second, meaning that both progressed to the second round of voting on 5–6 May 2012. Sarkozy lost in the runoff and conceded to Hollande. He received an estimated 48.38% compared to Hollande's 51.62%.

== Post-presidency (2012–present) ==
=== Temporary retirement: 2012–2014 ===
After his defeat at the 2012 election, Sarkozy asked his supporters to respect Hollande's victory. He invited his successor to attend his last 8 May Victory in Europe Day commemoration in office. His last day as President of the French Republic was 15 May.

Shortly after, Sarkozy briefly considered a career in private equity and secured a €250 million commitment from the Qatar Investment Authority to back his planned buyout firm. He abandoned his private equity plans when he decided to make a political comeback in 2014.

=== Return to politics: 2014–2016 ===
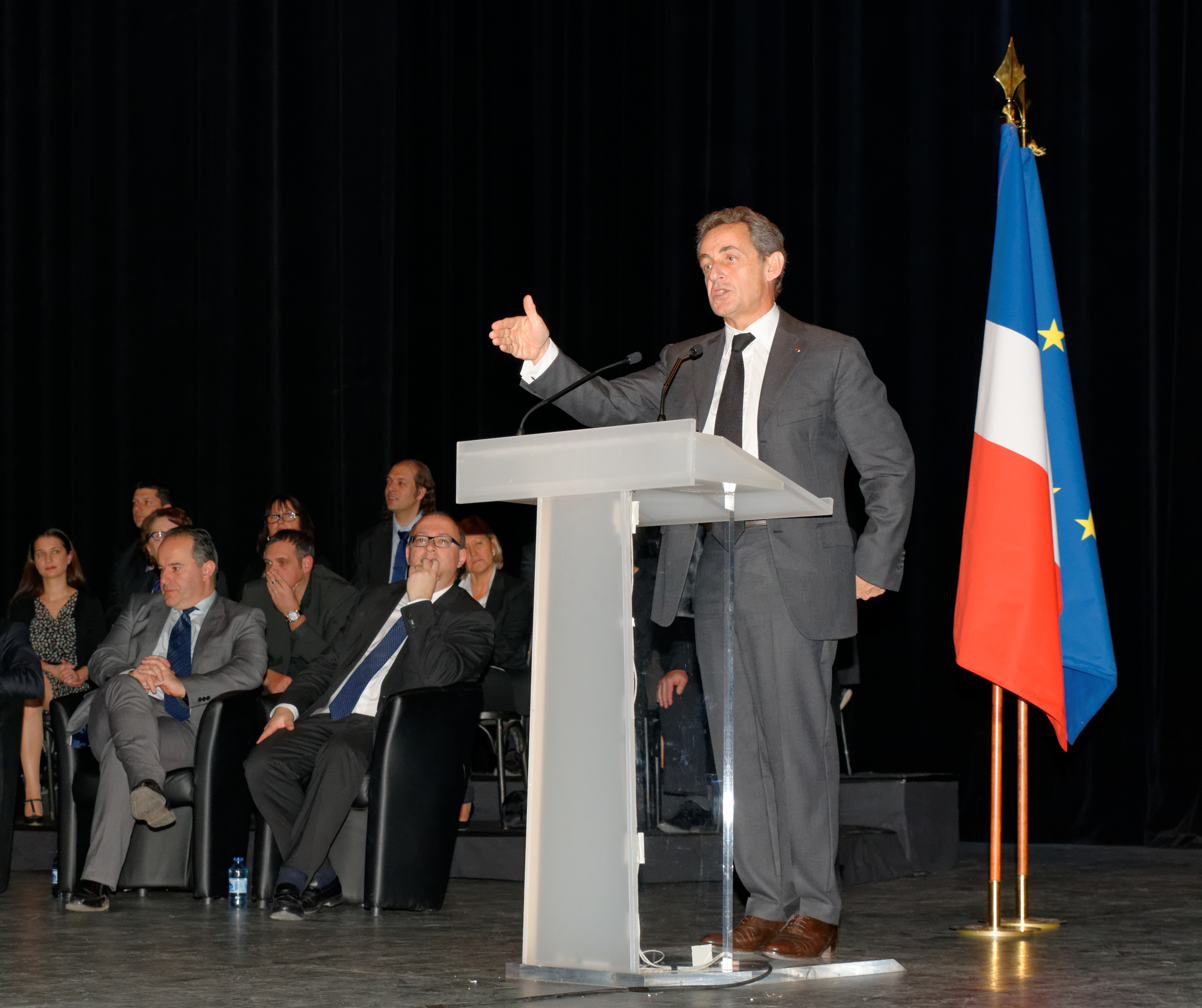
Nicolas Sarkozy's rally, Belfort, 12 March 2015

On 19 September 2014, Sarkozy announced that he was returning to politics and would run for chairman of the UMP party, and was elected to the post on 29 November 2014. Led by Sarkozy, UMP won over two-thirds of the 102 local départements in the nationwide elections on 29 March 2015. On 13 December, the Republicans won the majority of regional office races, another set of national elections. (On 30 May, the UMP's name was changed to the Republicans.)

In January 2016, Sarkozy published the book La France pour la vie. Though he insisted it was not a campaign book, it was widely perceived as one, since he had previously published a book ahead of his campaign in 2007. On August 22, he announced his candidacy for 2016 Republican presidential primary. After placing third behind François Fillon and Alain Juppé, he decided to endorse Fillon and signaled his retirement from politics.

=== Retirement from politics: 2017–present ===
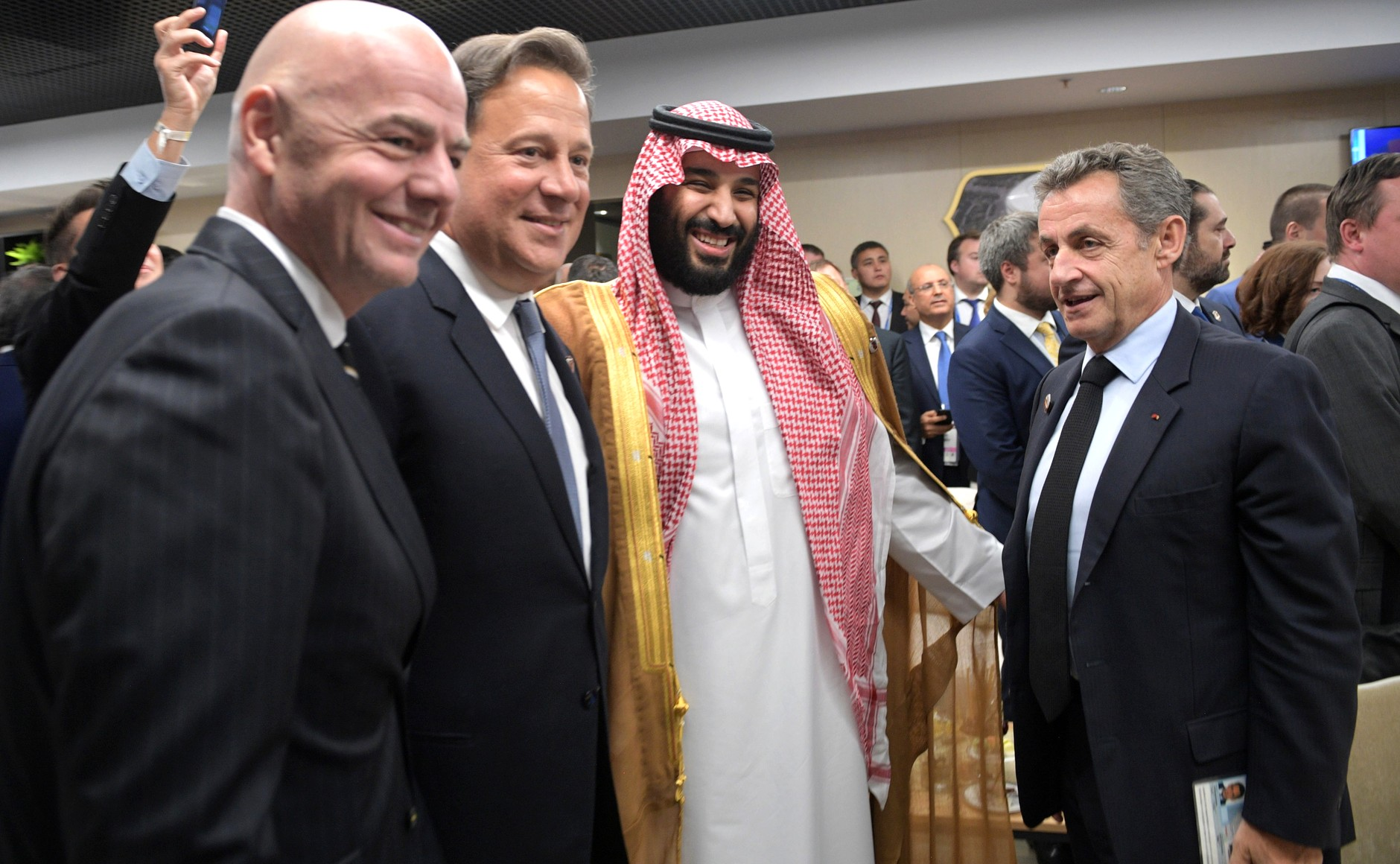
Sarkozy with Mohammad bin Salman, Gianni Infantino and Juan Carlos Varela at the FIFA World Cup in Russia, 14 June 2018

In 2020, Sarkozy was charged with corruption by French prosecutors in two cases, notably concerning the alleged Libyan interference in the 2007 French elections. At issue for Sarkozy were campaign costs exceeding the maximum allowed, and how they were paid. In 2021, Sarkozy was convicted of corruption in two separate trials. His first conviction resulted in him receiving a sentence of three years, two of them suspended and one in prison; he has appealed against the ruling. For his second conviction in September 2021, he received a one-year sentence, which he is allowed to serve under home confinement; his lawyer said he would appeal this decision.

Despite his retirement, Sarkozy remained active and influential in conservative circles. "French media reported that he is involved in the process of choosing a conservative candidate ahead of France's presidential election next year. But the pair of convictions could force Sarkozy to play a more discreet role in 2022's presidential race." Sarkozy endorsed Emmanuel Macron in the April 2022 election.

In February 2023, Sarkozy together with his wife and daughter visited the Western Wall in Jerusalem where they expressed their enthusiasm for the "exciting place" as well as their deep friendship with Israel. On 12 November 2023, he took part in the March for the Republic and Against Antisemitism in Paris, in response to the rise in antisemitism in France since the start of the Gaza war.

On 18 December 2024, Sarkozy was definitively sentenced to three years in prison, including one to be served under electronic monitoring, for corruption and influence peddling. He has appealed the decision to the European Court of Human Rights.

On 25 September 2025, Sarkozy was sentenced to five years in prison after being found guilty of criminal conspiracy in connection with alleged Libyan financing of his 2007 presidential campaign. He was acquitted of passive corruption, illegal campaign financing, and concealing the embezzlement of public funds.

On 21 October 2025, Sarkozy was jailed in Paris to start a five-year sentence due to his connection with alleged Libyan financing of a presidential campaign, becoming the first French postwar leader to be incarcerated.

== Other activities ==
=== Corporate boards ===
- Lagardère Group, Member of the supervisory board (since 2020)
- Accor, Independent Member of the board of directors and Chairman of the International Strategy Committee (since 2017)
- Groupe Lucien Barrière, Member of the Board of Directors (since 2019)

=== Non-profit organizations ===
- Berggruen Institute, Member of the 21st Century Council
- Schwarzman Scholars, Honorary Member of the Advisory Board

== Public image ==
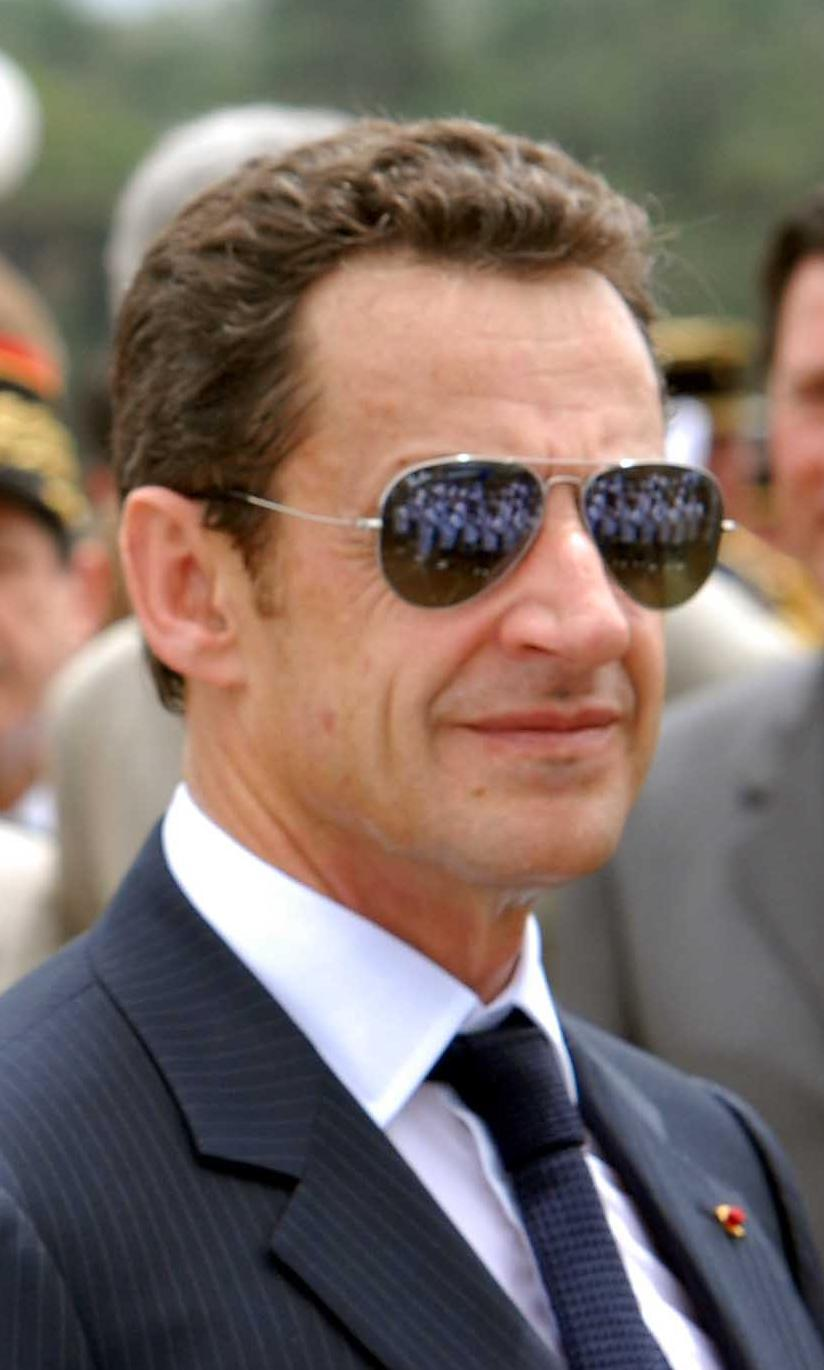
Nicolas Sarkozy in 2008

Sarkozy was named the 68th best-dressed person in the world by Vanity Fair, alongside David Beckham and Brad Pitt. However, Sarkozy has also been named as the third worst-dressed person in the world by GQ.

Beside publicising, at times, and at others, refusing to publicise his ex-wife Cécilia Ciganer-Albéniz's image, Sarkozy takes care of his own personal image, sometimes to the point of censorship—such as in the Paris Match affair, when he allegedly forced its director to resign following an article on his ex-wife and her affair with Publicis executive Richard Attias, or pressures exercised on the Journal du dimanche, which was preparing to publish an article concerning Ciganer-Albéniz's decision not to vote in the second round of the 2007 presidential election. In its edition of 9 August 2007, Paris Match retouched a photo of Sarkozy in order to erase a love handle. His official portrait destined for all French town halls was done by Sipa Press photographer Philippe Warrin, better known for his paparazzi work. Former Daily Telegraph journalist Colin Randall has highlighted Sarkozy's tighter control of his image and frequent interventions in the media: "he censors a book, or fires the chief editor of a weekly". Sarkozy lost a suit against a manufacturer of Sarkozy voodoo dolls, in which he claimed that he had a right to his own image.

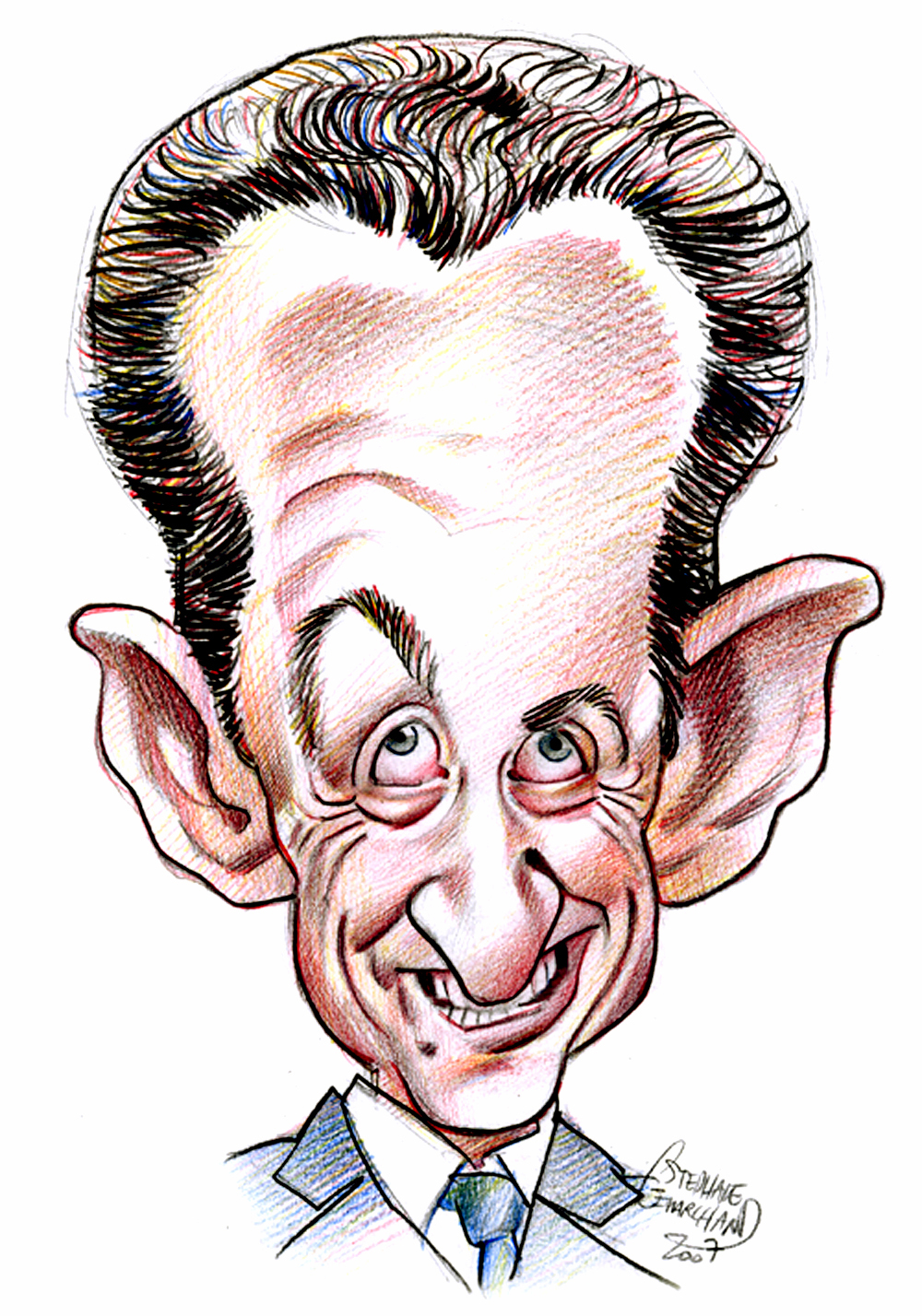
A French 2007 caricature of Sarkozy

Sarkozy is reported by Reuters to be sensitive about his height; believed to be 165 cm (e.g. 5 ft 5 in). The French media have pointed out that Carla Bruni frequently wears flats when in public with him. In 2009, a worker at a factory where Sarkozy gave a speech said she was asked to stand next to him because she was of a similar height to Sarkozy. (This story was corroborated by some trade union officials.) This was the subject of a political row: the president's office called the accusation "completely absurd and grotesque", while the Socialist Party mocked his fastidious preparation.

Sarkozy was nicknamed as Hyper-president or hyperpresident by some French media after his 2007 election as president, to describe his desire to control everything. Whereas in the history of the Fifth Republic, the successive presidents were traditionally focused on the foreign policy of the country and on international relations, leaving the Prime Minister and the government to determine the domestic policy, as the Constitution states it, Nicolas Sarkozy appeared to determine both the foreign and domestic policy. Some compared Nicolas Sarkozy to Napoléon Bonaparte and Louis XIV. Indeed, he appointed a very close friend of his, François Fillon, as a prime minister. Fillon was accused of being an instrument of the President's power.

The biopic The Conquest is a 2011 film that dramatizes Sarkozy's rise to power, with candid portrayals of Nicolas Sarkozy himself, Chirac and Villepin. It was shown at the 2011 Cannes Film Festival.

== Controversies ==
During his presidency, Sarkozy was generally disliked by the left and criticised by some on the right, most vocally by moderate Gaullist supporters of Jacques Chirac and Dominique de Villepin. The communist-leaning magazine L'Humanité has accused Sarkozy of populism.

=== Views on religions ===
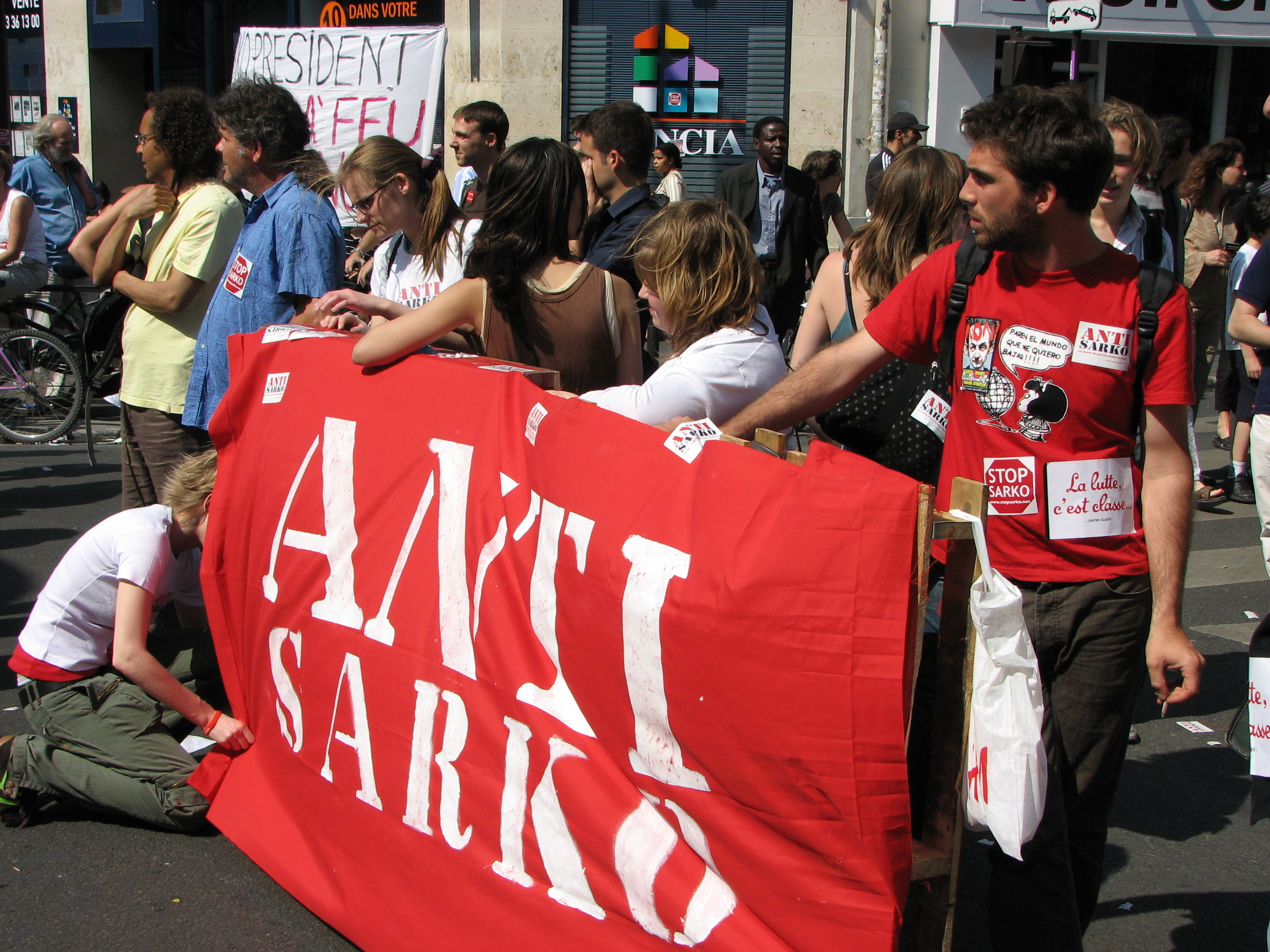
Many on the left distrust Sarkozy; specific "anti-Sarko" movements have been started.

In 2004 Sarkozy co-authored a book, La République, les religions, l'espérance (The Republic, Religions, and Hope), in which he argued that the young should not be brought up solely on secular or republican values. He advocated reducing the separation of church and state, arguing for the government subsidies for mosques to encourage Islamic integration into French society. He has opposed financing of religious institutions with funds from outside France. After meeting with Tom Cruise, Sarkozy was criticized by some for meeting with a member of the Church of Scientology, which has been seen by some as a cult. Sarkozy was criticized by some after he claimed "the roots of France are essentially Christian" at a December 2007 speech in Rome. Similarly, he drew criticism after he called Islam "one of the greatest and most beautiful civilizations the world has known" at a speech in Riyadh in January 2008.

=== Controversial statements ===
In the midst of a tense period and following the death of an 11-year-old boy, caught in the crossfire of a gang brawl in the Paris suburb of La Courneuve in June 2005, Sarkozy went to the scene and said: "on va nettoyer au Kärcher la cité" ("we will clean the area with a pressure washer"). Two days before the 2005 Paris riots, he referred to young criminals of nearby housing projects as "voyous" ("thugs") and "racaille", a slang term which can be translated into English as "rascals", "scum" or "riff-raff", in answer to a resident who addressed Sarkozy with "Quand nous débarrassez-vous de cette racaille?" ("When will you rid us of these dregs?"). The French Communist Party publication, L'Humanité, branded this language as inappropriate. Following Sarkozy's use of the word racaille, many people in the banlieues identified him as a politician of the far right. His period as Minister of the Interior saw the use of police as shock troops in the "banlieues", and a police "raid" on the suburb of Clichy-sous-Bois in October 2005 led to two boys being electrocuted in a power sub-station. The riots began that night.

In September 2005, Sarkozy was accused of pushing for a hasty inquiry into an arson attack on a police station in Pau, of which the alleged perpetrators were acquitted for lack of proof. On 22 June 2005 Sarkozy told law enforcement officials that he had questioned the Minister of Justice about the future of "the judge" who had freed a man on parole who had later committed a murder.

A few weeks before the first round of the 2007 presidential elections, Sarkozy had an interview with philosopher Michel Onfray. Sarkozy stated that disorders such as paedophilia and depression have a genetic as well as social basis, saying "... I'd be inclined to think that one is born a paedophile, and it is actually a problem that we do not know how to cure this disease"; he claimed that suicides among youth were linked to genetic predispositions by stating, "I don't want to give parents a complex. It's not exclusively the parents' fault every time a youngster commits suicide." These statements were criticised by some scientists, including geneticist Axel Kahn. Sarkozy later added, "What part is innate and what part is acquired? At least let's debate it, let's not close the door to all debate."

On 27 July 2007, Sarkozy delivered a speech in Dakar, Senegal, written by Henri Guaino, in which he claimed that "the African has never really entered into history". The controversial remarks were widely condemned by Africans, with some viewing them as racist. South African president Thabo Mbeki praised Sarkozy's speech, which raised criticism by some in the South African media.

On 30 July 2010, Sarkozy suggested a new policy of security, and he proposed "stripping foreign-born French citizens who opted to acquire their nationality at their majority of their citizenship if they are convicted of threatening the life of a police officer or other serious crimes". This policy has been criticized for example by the US newspaper The New York Times, by Sarkozy's political opponents, including the Socialist Party leader Martine Aubry, and by experts of French law, including the ex-member of the Constitutional Council of France, Robert Badinter, who said that such action would be unconstitutional.

He called for coercive methods to promote "métissage," a melting pot society, which he called an "obligation" during a press conference on 17 December 2008.

=== "Casse-toi, pauv'con" ===
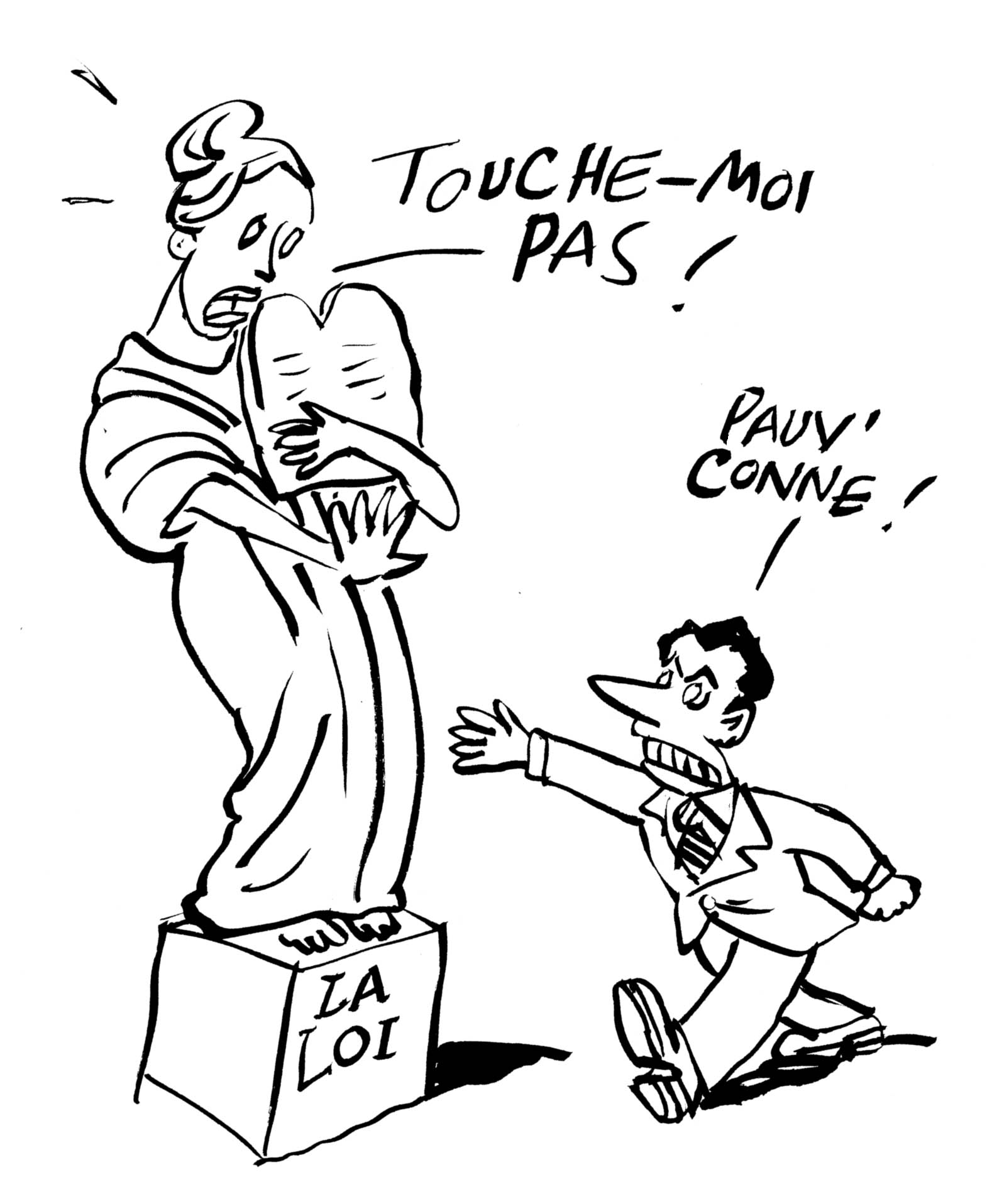
Caricature of Nicolas Sarkozy (right) parodizing his "Casse-toi, pauv'con" moment in February 2008. Marianne, symbolizing the Law, says "Don't touch me!" while Sarkozy insults her.

On 23 February 2008, Sarkozy was filmed by a reporter for French newspaper Le Parisien having the following exchange while visiting the Paris International Agricultural Show:

While quickly crossing the hall Saturday morning, in the middle of the crowd, Sarkozy encounters a recalcitrant visitor who refuses to shake his hand. "Ah no, don't touch me!", said the man. The president retorted immediately: "Get lost, then." "You're making me dirty", yelled the man. With a frozen smile, Sarkozy says, his teeth glistening, a refined "Get lost, then, poor dumb-ass, go." (Note: In French: "Lors de sa traversée éclair du salon samedi matin, en plein bain de foule, Sarkozy croise un visiteur récalcitrant qui refuse sa poignée de main. «Ah non, touche-moi pas», prévient-il. Le chef de l'État rétorque sans détour: «Casse-toi, alors.» «Tu me salis», embraye l'homme. Le sourire se crispe. Sarkozy lâche, desserrant à peine les dents, un raffiné «Casse-toi alors, pauv'con, va.»)

A precise translation into English has many possible variations.

On 28 August 2008, Hervé Eon, from Laval, came to an anti-Sarkozy demonstration with a sign bearing the words Casse-toi pov' con, the exact words Sarkozy had uttered. Eon was arrested for causing offence to the presidential function, and the prosecutor, who in France indirectly reports to the president, requested a fine of €1000. The court eventually imposed a symbolic €30 suspended fine, which has generally been interpreted as a defeat for the prosecution side. This incident was widely reported on, in particular as Sarkozy, as president of the Republic, is immune from prosecution, notably restricting Eon's rights to sue Sarkozy for defamation.

=== Position on the Iraq war ===
Sarkozy opposed the U.S.-led invasion of Iraq. However, he was critical of the way Chirac and his foreign minister Dominique de Villepin expressed France's opposition to the war. Talking at the French-American Foundation in Washington, D.C., on 12 September 2006, he denounced what he called the "French arrogance" and said: "It is bad manners to embarrass one's allies or sound like one is taking delight in their troubles." He added: "We must never again turn our disagreements into a crisis." Chirac reportedly said in private that Sarkozy's speech was "appalling" and "a shameful act".

=== Accusations of nepotism ===
In October 2009, Sarkozy was accused of nepotism for helping his son, Jean, try to become head of the public body running France's biggest business district, EPAD. On 3 July 2012, French police raided Sarkozy's residence and office as part of a probe into claims that Sarkozy was involved in illegal political campaign financing.

=== Ukraine ===
In an interview with Le Figaro in August 2023, Sarkozy said that Ukraine should remain "neutral" and not join NATO or the EU; that France and Russia "need each other"; and that Macron should "renew dialogue" with Putin. In the same interview, Sarkozy called for Ukraine to accept the Russian occupation of Crimea as well as other contested territory, describing the return of Crimea to Ukraine as "illusory".

He condemned the Russian invasion of Ukraine but insisted that "Russia will remain our neighbour whether we like it or not. We must find ways and means to re-establish neighbourly, or at least calmer, relations" and "take into account Russia's historic fear of being encircled by unfriendly neighbours." Critics have reproved his comments as "shameful" and "shocking", and others have accused Sarkozy of being a "Kremlin influencer". Sarkozy has also received support from others for his position, arguing that it presents a "diplomatic way out" of the war.

=== Ties to France's business elite ===
Several media outlets and commentators have documented the perception that Nicolas Sarkozy’s presidency was marked by unusually close ties to France's business elite, leading to accusation of ‘cronyism’.

Academic research has examined how Nicolas Sarkozy’s 2007 election influenced corporate valuations and executive behavior in firms linked to him. In a 2014 study published in the Journal of Public Economics, by Renaud Coulomb and Marc Sangnier analyzed 23 firms in the SBF 120 whose owners or executives were identified as close to Sarkozy. Comparing firms stock returns to broader market movements in the months before the election, they found that these firms experienced an average extra stock market increase of 3% due to his election, higher than the 2% observed for firms expected to benefit from his policy program, implying that personal ties to the president had a measurable economic effect.

A subsequent study, published in 2021 in the Journal of the European Economic Association by Thomas Bourveau, Renaud Coulomb, and Marc Sangnier, examined insider trading behaviors of executives connected to Sarkozy. Using over 10,900 transactions by 1,827 executives between 2006 and 2008, the authors found that executives linked to Sarkozy were more likely to trade closer to company earnings announcements and to violate reporting deadlines after the election (compared to non-connected executives). Furthermore, market participants reacted positively to share purchases by executives connected to Sarkozy following his election (compared to non-connected executives), suggesting that investors perceived these trades as containing accrued valuable private information. The uncovered empirical evidence is coherent with an increase in illegal insider trading (the fact for an insider to trade their firm stocks using private information) for connected executives after his election. While these patterns do not establish proven illegal insider trading, they suggest that political proximity may have altered financial behavior, potentially reflecting a perception of reduced regulatory risk for some politically connected executives.

== Legal affairs ==
=== Political and financial scandals and criminal convictions ===
On 5 July 2010, following its investigations on the Bettencourt affair, online newspaper Mediapart ran an article in which Claire Thibout, a former accountant of billionairess Liliane Bettencourt, accused Sarkozy and Eric Woerth of receiving illegal campaign donations in 2007, in cash.

On 1 July 2014, Sarkozy was detained for questioning by police over claims he had promised a prestigious role in Monaco to a high-ranking judge, Gilbert Azibert, in exchange for information about the investigation into alleged illegal campaign funding. Mr Azibert, one of the most senior judges at the Court of Appeal, was called in for questioning on 30 June 2014. It is believed to be the first time a former French president has been held in police custody, although his predecessor, Jacques Chirac, was found guilty of embezzlement and breach of trust while he was mayor of Paris and given a suspended prison sentence in 2011. After 15 hours in police custody, Sarkozy was put under official investigation for "active corruption", "misuse of influence" and "obtained through a breach of professional secrecy" on 2 July 2014. Mr Azibert and Sarkozy's lawyer, Thierry Herzog, are also now under official investigation. The two accusations carry sentences of up to 10 years in prison. The developments were seen as a blow to Sarkozy's attempts to challenge for the presidency in 2017. Nevertheless, he later stood as a candidate for the Republican party nomination, but was eliminated from the contest in November 2016. A trial on this case, Sarkozy's first, started on 23 November 2020.

On 16 February 2016, Sarkozy was indicted on "illegal financing of political campaign" charges related to overspending in his 2012 presidential campaign and retained as witness in connection with the Bygmalion scandal.

In April 2016, Arnaud Claude, former law partner of Sarkozy, was named in the Panama Papers.

On 23 November 2020, the trial of Nicolas Sarkozy started. He is accused of corruption and influence peddling, for an attempted bribery of a judge. The trial was postponed until 26 November, following a request from one of his co-defendants for health reasons.

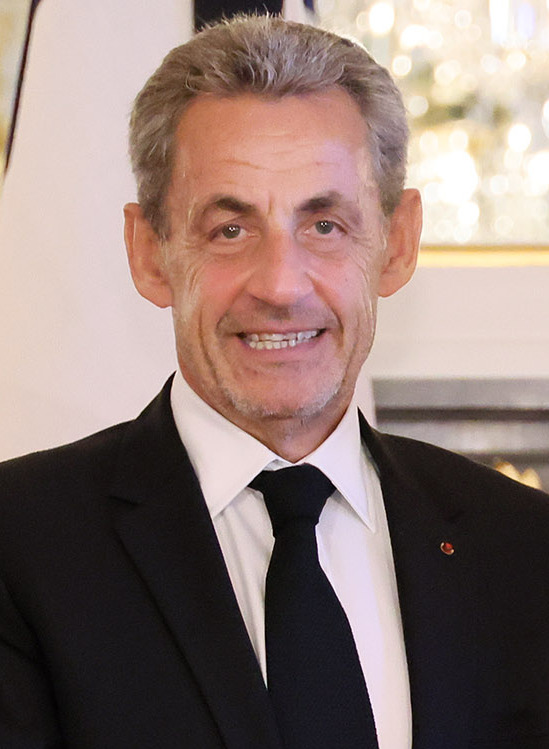
Sarkozy in 2022

On 1 March 2021, a court in Paris found former French President Nicolas Sarkozy guilty of corruption, trading in influence in a wiretapping and illegal data exchange case involving a number of individuals like magistrate Gilbert Azibert and Sarkozy's former lawyer Thierry Herzog. Both of these men were tried with him and all three were convicted. Sarkozy and his two co-defendants were sentenced to three years (two years of the sentence suspended) with twelve months in prison. Sarkozy appealed the ruling, which postponed any sentence imposement. The appeal process in 2024, reduced his eventual prison incarceration by half, to that of six-months.

On 20 May 2021, a second criminal trial, this time pertaining to the Bygmalion Scandal related to illegal campaign funding, began for Sarkozy, as well as 13 other defendants who were said to have been involved in the Bygmalion scandal. Sarkozy's second corruption trial involved allegations of diverting tens of millions of euros which was intended to be spent on his failed 2012 re-election campaign and then hiring a PR firm to cover it up. The illicit campaign finance money was instead used to overspend on lavish campaign rallies and events.

On 30 September 2021, Sarkozy was convicted along with his co-defendants. For this conviction, Sarkozy was given a one-year prison sentence, though he was also given the option to serve this sentence at home with an electronic bracelet. On 18 December 2024, the Court of Cassation rejected Nicolas Sarkozy's appeal in cassation and the co-defendants, thus making Nicolas Sarkozy's conviction final; he immediately announced that they would refer the matter to the European Court of Human Rights.

In 2023, Sarkozy's attempt to appeal the decision was denied, and he has been banned from holding public office for three years and will still have the option of serving his sentence from home with an electronic bracelet.

In February 2024, an appeals court in Paris upheld an earlier 2021, lower court decision requiring Sarkozy to serve his sentence for the campaign overspending conviction. However, the one-year sentence was revised so that he would instead serve six months of it in prison and six months of it suspended.

=== Libyan campaign financing case ===
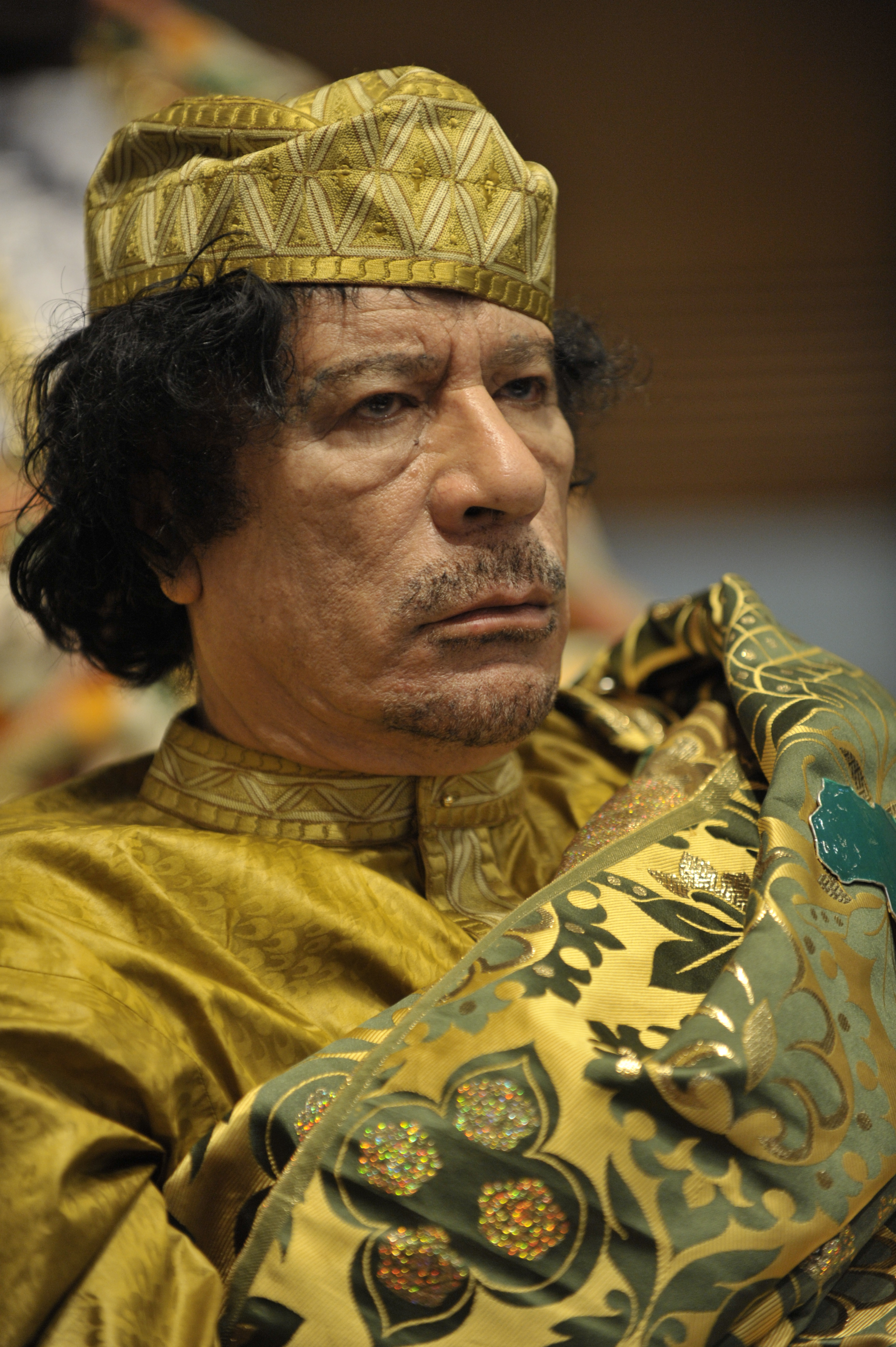
Former Libyan leader Muammar Gaddafi allegedly paid €50 million to Sarkozy in exchange for access.

Shortly after his inauguration as President of France in 2007, Nicolas Sarkozy invited Libyan leader Muammar Gaddafi to France over the objections of both the political opposition and members of his own government. The visit marked the first time Gaddafi had been to France in more than 35 years and, during it, France agreed to sell Libya 21 Airbus aircraft and signed a nuclear cooperation agreement. Negotiations for the purchase of more than a dozen Dassault Rafale fighter jets, plus military helicopters, were also initiated during the trip.

During the 2011 Libyan Civil War – a conflict in which France intervened – Saif-al-Islam Gaddafi said in an interview with euronews that the Libyan state had donated €50 million to Sarkozy's 2007 presidential campaign in exchange for access and favors by Sarkozy.

Investigative website Mediapart subsequently published several documents appearing to prove a payment of €50 million, and also published a claim by Ziad Takieddine (disclaimer by the same person in another video) that he had personally handed three briefcases stuffed with cash to Sarkozy. French magistrates later acquired diaries of former Libyan oil minister Shukri Ghanem in which payments to Sarkozy were mentioned. Shortly thereafter, however, Ghanem was found dead, floating in the Danube in Austria and thereby preventing his corroboration of the diaries.

In January 2018, British police arrested Alexandre Djouhri on a European Arrest Warrant. Djouhri was an associate of Sarkozy and had refused to respond to a French judicial summons for questioning over allegations he had helped launder Libyan funds on behalf of Sarkozy.

On 25 September 2025, Sarkozy was convicted of criminal association in the Libyan financing case and sentenced to five years in prison and a €100,000 fine. He was acquitted of other charges and announced he would appeal, while the court ruled the sentence enforceable pending appeal. The verdict came two days after the death of key accuser Ziad Takieddine.

On 21 October 2025, Sarkozy entered La Santé Prison in Montparnasse to commence his five-year term in segregation. Lawyers have applied for his release. On 10 November 2025, a court ordered his release under judicial supervision pending an appeal trial scheduled in March 2026. On 26 November, the Court of Cassation upheld Sarkozy's conviction.

Sarkozy spent roughly 20 days in prison. Sarkozy has stated he is innocent and that he plans to prove it in his upcoming 2026 appeal trial.

In December 2025, Sarkozy published a memoir of his spell in prison, entitled A Prisoner's Diary.

== Political career ==
- President of the French Republic: 2007–2012.
- Ex Officio Member of the Constitutional Council of France: since 2012 (stopped sitting in 2013).

Governmental functions

- Minister of Budget and government's spokesman: 1993–1995.
- Minister of Communication and government's spokesman: 1994–1995.
- Minister of State, minister of Interior, of the Internal Security and Local Freedoms: 2002–2004.
- Minister of State, minister of Economy, Finance and Industry: March–November 2004 (resignation).
- Minister of State, minister of Interior and Land Planning: 2005–2007 (resignation).

Electoral mandates

European Parliament

- Member of the European Parliament: July–September 1999 (resignation). Elected in 1999.

National Assembly of France

- Member of the National Assembly of France for Hauts-de-Seine (6th constituency): 1988–1993 (became minister in 1993) / 1995–2002 (became minister in 2002) / March–June 2005 (became minister in June 2005). Elected in 1988, reelected in 1993, 1995, 1997, 2002, 2005.

Regional Council

- Regional councillor of Île-de-France: 1983–1988 (resignation). Elected in 1986.

General Council

- President of the General Council of Hauts-de-Seine: 2004–2007 (resignation, became President of the French Republic in 2007).
- Vice-president of the General Council of Hauts-de-Seine: 1986–1988 (resignation).
- General councillor of Hauts-de-Seine, elected in the canton of Neuilly-sur-Seine-Nord: 1985–1988 / 2004–2007 (Resignation, became President of the French Republic in 2007).

Municipal Council

- Mayor of Neuilly-sur-Seine: 1983–2002 (resignation). Reelected in 1989, 1995, and 2001.
- Deputy-mayor of Neuilly-sur-Seine: 2002–2005 (resignation).
- Municipal councillor of Neuilly-sur-Seine: 1977–2005 (resignation). Reelected in 1983, 1989, 1995, and 2001.

Political functions

- President of The Republicans: 2015–2016.
- President of the Union for a Popular Movement: 2004–2007 and 2014–2015 (resignation, became President of the French Republic in 2007). Reelected in 2014.
- President of the Rally for the Republic: April–October 1999.
- General secretary of the Rally for the Republic: 1998–1999.
- Deputy general secretary of the Rally for the Republic: 1992–1993.

== Awards and honours ==
=== French honours ===
Legion of Honour
Grand Master – 2007 to 2012
Grand Cross – 2007, automatic when taking office; revoked in 2025
Knight – 2004; revoked in 2025

National Order of Merit
Grand Master – 2007 to 2012
Grand Cross – 2007, automatic when taking office; revoked in 2025

=== Foreign honours ===
Recipient of the Order of Glory (Armenia) – 2011
Commander of the Order of Leopold (Belgium) – 2004
Grand Collar of the Order of the Southern Cross (Brazil) – 2009
Member 1st Class of the Order of the Balkan Mountains (Bulgaria) – 2007
Recipient of the St. George's Order of Victory (Georgia) – 2011
Grand Cross of the Order of the Redeemer (Greece) – 2008
Grand Cross of the National Order of the Ivory Coast (Ivory Coast) – 2012
Recipient of the Order of the Golden Eagle (Kazakhstan) – 2009
Collar of the Order of Mubarak the Great (Kuwait) – 2009
Extraordinary Class of the Order of Merit (Lebanon) – 2009
Special Class of the Order of Muhammad (Morocco) – 2007
Knight Grand Cross of the Order of Saint-Charles (Monaco) – 25 April 2008
Collar of the Order of the Independence (Qatar) – 2008
Collar of the Order of Abdulaziz Al Saud (Saudi Arabia) – 2008
Knight of the Order of the Golden Fleece (Spain) – 2011
Knight of the Collar of the Order of Charles III (Spain) – 2009, Grand Cross – 2004
Grand Cordon of the Order of the Seventh of November (Tunisia) – 28 April 2008
Member 1st First Class of the Order of Prince Yaroslav the Wise (Ukraine) – 2010
Collar of the Order of Zayed (United Arab Emirates) – 2008
Honorary Knight Grand Cross of the Order of the Bath (United Kingdom) – 2008

=== Other honours ===
Holy See: Proto-canon of the Papal Basilicas of St. John Lateran and St. Peter's (2007–2012; the post is held ex officio by the French head of state)
Italy: Premio Mediterraneo

== See also ==
- Robert Bourgi – French-Lebanese political advisor (born 1945)

== Notes ==
Political offices
Preceded by Achille Peretti	Mayor of Neuilly-sur-Seine; 1983–2002	Succeeded by Louis-Charles Bary
Preceded by Louis Mermaz	Government Spokesperson; 1993–1995	Succeeded by Philippe Douste-Blazy
Preceded by Michel Charasse	Minister of the Budget; 1993–1995	Succeeded by François d'Aubert
Preceded by Alain Carignon	Minister of Communications; 1994–1995	Succeeded by Catherine Trautmann
Preceded by Daniel Vaillant	Minister of the Interior; 2002–2004	Succeeded by Dominique de Villepin
Preceded by Charles Pasqua	President of the General Council of Hauts-de-Seine; 2004–2007	Succeeded by Patrick Devedjian
Preceded by Francis Mer	Minister of Finance; 2004	Succeeded by Hervé Gaymard
Preceded by Dominique de Villepin	Minister of the Interior; 2005–2007	Succeeded by François Baroin
Preceded by Jacques Chirac	President of France; 2007–2012	Succeeded by François Hollande
Preceded by Janez Janša	President of the European Council; 2008	Succeeded by Mirek Topolánek
Party political offices
Preceded by Philippe Séguin	Acting President of Rally for the Republic; 1999	Succeeded by Michèle Alliot-Marie
Preceded by Jean-Claude Gaudin; Acting	President of Union for a Popular Movement; 2004–2007	Succeeded by Jean-Claude Gaudin; Acting
Preceded by Alain Juppé; Jean-Pierre Raffarin; François Fillon; Acting	President of Union for a Popular Movement; 2014–2015	Party abolished
New political party	President of The Republicans; 2015–2016	Succeeded by Laurent Wauquiez
Regnal titles
Preceded by Jacques Chirac	Co-Prince of Andorra; 2007–2012; With Joan Enric Vives Sicília	Succeeded by François Hollande
Preceded by Joan Enric Vives Sicília	Co-Prince of Andorra; 2007–2012; With Joan Enric Vives Sicília	Succeeded by Joan Enric Vives Sicília
Catholic Church titles
Preceded by Jacques Chirac	Honorary Canon of the Papal Basilicas of St. John Lateran and St. Peter; 2007–2012	Succeeded by François Hollande
Diplomatic posts
Preceded by Stephen Harper	Chair of the Group of 8; 2011	Succeeded by Barack Obama
Preceded by Lee Myung-bak	Chair of the Group of 20; 2011	Succeeded by Felipe Calderón
Order of precedence
Preceded by Yaël Braun-Pivet as President of the National Assembly	Order of precedence of France as Former President of the Republic	Succeeded by François Hollande as Former President of the Republic
