= Hervé Temime =

French lawyer (1957–2023)

- Born: 26 June 1957; Algiers, French Algeria
- Died: 10 April 2023 (aged 65); Paris, France
- Education: Paris-Panthéon-Assas University; Sciences Po
- Occupation: Lawyer

Hervé Temime (26 June 1957 – 10 April 2023) was a French lawyer. He was known for his books La Défense dans la peau and Secret défense, and he represented Bernard Tapie and Roman Polanski in court cases.

Temime died in Paris on 10 April 2023, at the age of 65. His death was announced by the Minister of Justice Éric Dupond-Moretti. It intervenes following a dissection of the aorta.
