= Nicolas Sarkozy corruption trial =

2020 trial of former French President

The 2020 trial in France for the former French President Nicolas Sarkozy dealt with allegations that he bribed a judge with a retirement package in return for information on an investigation into alleged campaign finance violations due to payments he is said to have received from heiress Liliane Bettencourt. The trial opened on 24 November 2020. Prosecutors asked for a four-year jail sentence (of which two would be suspended) for Sarkozy, the implicated judge (Gilbert Azibert), and Sarkozy's lawyer Thierry Herzog. On 4 December 2020, Ziad Takieddine, a Lebanese businessman who allegedly helped finance Sarkozy's 2007 presidential election campaign with help from former Libyan leader Muammar Gaddafi, was detained in Lebanon, although he was allowed a conditional prison release a few days later after agreeing to abide by a travel ban. The defendants denied the accusations. The trial concluded on 10 December; the verdict was rendered on 1 March 2021. Sarkozy, Azibert, and Herzog were found guilty and sentenced to three years in jail for corruption. Two years of this sentence are suspended, and one to be served in prison. Sarkozy appealed, suspending the ruling. On 17 May 2023, Sarkozy, as well as his co-defendants, was convicted on appeal and given a three-year sentence; they appealed to the Court of Cassation.

On 20 May 2021, a new criminal trial related to illegal campaign funding began for Sarkozy, as well as 13 other defendants who were said to have been involved in the Bygmalion scandal. Sarkozy's second corruption trial involved allegations of diverting tens of millions of euros intended to be spent on his failed 2012 re-election campaign and then hiring a PR firm to cover it up. Rather than spend this illicit money on his re-election campaign, Sarkozy instead overspent it on lavish campaign rallies and events. On 30 September 2021, Sarkozy, as well as his co-defendants, was convicted at the conclusion of this corruption trial. For this conviction, he was given a one year prison sentence, although he was also given the option to instead serve this sentence at home with an electronic bracelet. On 18 December 2024, the Court of Cassation rejected Nicolas Sarkozy's appeal in cassation and the co-defendants, thus making Nicolas Sarkozy's conviction final, who immediately announced that they would refer the matter to the European Court of Human Rights.

In November 2025, Nicolas Sarkozy spent a few weeks in jail (at La Santé jail in Paris)
