= Thierry Herzog =

French lawyer

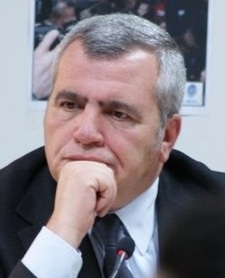
- Herzog in 2010
- Born: October 9, 1955 (age 70); Paris, France
- Education: Lycée Jacques-Decour
- Occupation: Lawyer

Thierry Herzog (born October 9, 1955) is a French lawyer. He is the former lawyer of Nicolas Sarkozy, who was the President of France from 2007 to 2012.

== Life and career ==
Herzog first became friends with Nicolas Sarkozy in the 1980s.

Herzog was once the lawyer of Jean Tiberi and Xavière Tiberi.

Herzog defended Nicolas Sarkozy during the Clearstream affair, a political scandal in France in the run-up to the 2007 presidential election.

In 2009, Herzog was awarded the Legion of Honour, the highest French order of merit.

Herzog defended Nicolas Sarkozy during the Bettencourt affair, an affair involving allegations of illegal payments made by billionaire heiress Liliane Bettencourt to François-Marie Banier and members of the French government associated with Sarkozy in 2010.

Herzog was a co-defendant in the Nicolas Sarkozy corruption trial, along with Nicolas Sarkozy and former magistrate Gilbert Azibert. Herzog appealed his conviction.
