= Hervé Gattegno =

- Born: July 28, 1964 (age 62); Marseille, France
- Education: École publique de journalisme de Tours; École de journalisme et de communication d'Aix-Marseille
- Occupation: Journalism
- Spouse: Anne-Cécile Sarfati

Hervé Gattegno (born July 28, 1964) is a French investigative journalist.

He served as the editor-in-chief of the French edition of Vanity Fair until 2016. He has also been the editorial director of Le Journal du Dimanche and Paris Match, as well as a columnist for RMC and BFM TV.

== Biography ==
=== Family ===
Hervé Gattegno was born in 1964 in Marseille.

He is married to Anne-Cécile Sarfati, an author and the editor-in-chief of Elle magazine, with whom he has three children.

=== Career ===
Hervé Gattegno is a graduate of the École publique de journalisme de Tours and the École de journalisme et de communication d'Aix-Marseille.

He began his career at Le Méridional, a regional daily newspaper with right-wing leanings in Marseille, before joining Le Nouvel Observateur.

From 1992 to 2007, he collaborated with the daily newspaper Le Monde, where he specialized in investigative journalism. He became the chief editor of the "France" section, and his work was widely recognized (despite a controversy).

In 2003, he was convicted for defamation due to an article published on June 20, 2002, which alleged that Roland Dumas had influenced the Constitutional Council to make a decision favorable to President Chirac on January 22, 1999, regarding the criminal liability of the head of state in exchange for "presidential neutrality" concerning his own judicial affairs.

Later, he served as the chief editor of the investigative unit at the magazine Le Point. He also contributed to Jean-Jacques Bourdin's morning show, Bourdin & Co on RMC, where he hosts a daily column called Le parti pris de Gattegno. He is reported to be close to Arnaud Montebourg, according to journalists Guy Benhamou and L'Express.

From 2013 to 2016, he was the chief editor of investigative reports for the French edition of Vanity Fair, launched successfully by Michel Denisot.

In June 2016, he was appointed as the editorial director of Le Journal du Dimanche, replacing Jérôme Bellay, 73 years old, who announced his departure from JDD in May.

Since September 2018, he has been offering editorials for the weekend morning show on Europe 1 presented by Bernard Poirette.

In October 2019, he became the director general of publications for Paris Match. He revamped the layout, but his passionate editorials in favor of Nicolas Sarkozy caused discomfort within the team and resulted in numerous departures. His policies aimed at cutting costs on what has been the magazine's DNA—photographs and reports—also raised concerns among journalists.

On October 18, 2021, he was dismissed from both the JDD and Paris Match by agreement with the Lagardère Group.

Currently, Hervé Gattegno provides a daily press review for listeners of Radio Classique.

=== Scandals exposed ===
Throughout his career, Hervé Gattegno has exposed multiple political and financial scandals, notably the involvement of Roland Dumas in the Elf affair, the posthumous videotape confession by Jean-Claude Méry, a key figure in the Paris housing project scandal in 1994, and the testimony of the former chief of staff to Gaddafi, Bechir Saleh.

==== The Notebooks of General Rondot ====
Philippe Rondot's personal notebooks, seized during a raid at his home, revealed their contents under Hervé Gattegno's disclosure, placing Prime Minister Dominique de Villepin in a difficult position.

These notes, which recorded orders and tasks, were partially classified as top secret but are now declassified. General Rondot, head of France's intelligence services, had the habit of writing down his actions and conversations in small notebooks. He also used coded names for individuals: thus, the prime minister is abbreviated as PM, the president of the Republic as PR, and Imad Lahoud as Mahdi.

According to Libération on July 13, 2007, General Rondot's practice of spiral-bound notebooks reflects a "bizarre graphomania."

==== Bettencourt Affair ====
In the context of the Bettencourt affair, he revealed recordings made by the billionaire's butler, Pascal Bonnefoy. These recordings were considered incriminating evidence against several members of Liliane Bettencourt's entourage by the courts. Accused of "invading privacy," Gattegno was acquitted on January 12, 2016 by the Bordeaux correctional court.

He explained that he used methods similar to those of an investigating judge. The journalist Pierre Péan noted, "He would leave his business card in the mailbox of an inaccessible protagonist with a simple note: 'Hervé Gattegno wants to hear from you.'."

==== Marković Affair ====
In late 2023, Hervé Gattegno published an investigation into the Marković affair titled "Un cadavre sur la route de l'Élysée: Les derniers secrets de l'affaire Markovic." Based on numerous newly discovered hidden documents from the judicial case and De Gaulle's files, it reinforces doubts about the unclear roles and responsibility of Alain Delon, his right-hand man Markovic, and François Marcantoni – a figure from Pigalle's criminal underworld since the 1950s.

=== Controversies ===
He is suspected of having censored in November 2018 an investigation into the LREM deputy Francis Chouat, who is very close to Manuel Valls. According to the newspaper Marianne, the latter directly intervened with him to prevent the publication of the investigation.

Mediapart journalists Karl Laske and Fabrice Arfi highlight his stance favoring a thesis beneficial to Nicolas Sarkozy in the affair involving funding for his presidential campaign with Libyan money. The journalists note that he appears to produce several articles based on persistent suggestions from Alexandre Djouhri, who was recently indicted in this case. They provide a text they attribute to the magistrates handling the affair: "The intercepted telephone conversations between Alexandre Djouhri and Hervé Gattegno indeed establish that he asks him to publish articles on specific topics, notably the interview with Bashir Saleh [Kadhafi's chief of staff - ed.] in Johannesburg [...]; numerous telephone conversations from 2013 to 2014 establish the closeness between the two individuals; in these conversations, Alexandre Djouhri does not appear to be a source but rather someone giving orders." He is an assisted witness in the judicial investigation regarding intermediary Ziad Takieddine's retraction of his accusations of Libyan funding for Nicolas Sarkozy's 2007 presidential campaign.

Following a 2016 article pointing out these relationships, Hervé Gattegno filed a defamation lawsuit on November 14, 2017 against Arfi, Laske, and Edwy Plenel, the editor-in-chief of Mediapart. He won in the first trial but lost on appeal and then in cassation on March 2, 2021.

== Publications ==
- 1997 : « Journalisme et recel : aspects journalistiques », in Jean-Yves Dupeux (dir.) and Alain Lacabarats (dir.), Liberté de la presse et droits de la personne, Proceedings of the symposium held on 20 June 1997 by the Tribunal de grande instance de Paris and the Ordre des avocats à la Cour de Paris, Dalloz, coll. « Thèmes et commentaires », Paris, 163 p. ISBN 2-247-02893-4, p. 131–136
- 1998 : L'Affaire Dumas, Stock, Paris, 278 p. ISBN 2-234-05062-6 ; new extended edition subtitled Dernière édition avant procès, 2001, 400 p. ISBN 2-234-05278-5 : on the Dumas affair
- 2006 : L'Irresponsable : Une présidence française, 1995-2007, Stock, Paris, 303 p. ISBN 2-234-05854-6 : on the Presidency of Jacques Chirac
- 2007 : Femmes au pouvoir : Récits et confidences, with Anne-Cécile Sarfati and the collaboration of Myriam Levain, Stock, Paris, 401 p. ISBN 978-2-234-06025-8
- 2023 : Un cadavre sur la route de l'Élysée: The last secrets of the Marković affair, Flammarion, Paris, 352 p. ISBN 978-2080426345
