= Fabrice Arfi =

French investigative journalist (born 1981)

- Fabrice Arfi in 2018
- Born: 4 September 1981 (age 45); Lyon, France
- Citizenship: French
- Occupation: Investigative journalist
- Employer: Mediapart
- Awards: Prix éthique d'Anticor (2015); Prix du Livre du Journalisme (2016); Prix Jean-Daniel (2025)

Fabrice Arfi (born 4 September 1981 in Lyon), is a French journalist. He is known for investigatiions that led to numerous revelations concerning Bettencourt affair, Karachi affair, Sarkozy-Kadhafi affair, the carbon emissions trading scandal and Cahuzac affair.

== Biography ==
=== Family ===
Fabrice Arfi is the son of a senior education adviser (CPE) at a vocational secondary school and Alain Arfi, a lawyer who once served as a police inspector from 1976 to 1988, working first in the counterfeiting unit and later in the financial crime squad. On his father's side, he is of Algerian Jewish descent, while on his mother's side, he is of French and Swiss.

=== Career ===
==== Before Mediapart ====
After obtaining his baccalauréat, he joined the culture desk of the daily newspaper Lyon Figaro as an intern in 1999, the Lyon edition of the national newspaper Le Figaro. He subsequently became its music columnist, before covering the courts for several years, succeeding Gérard Schmitt. After working in Lyon for AFP on its crime and justice desk, he co-founded the weekly newspaper Tribune de Lyon, which was bought by a group of its employees in November 2006. He also contributed to Le Parisien/Aujourd'hui en France, Libération and Le Monde.

==== Mediapart (2018-) ====
In March 2018, he joined the investigative desk of the independent online news outlet Mediapart. Vanity Fair has described him as the "spiritual son" of Edwy Plenel, co-founder and president of Mediapart.

As an investigative journalist, he and fellow journalist Fabrice Lhomme were behind numerous revelations concerning Bettencourt affair and Karachi affair. He was also behind revelations concerning Sarkozy-Kadhafi affair and Cahuzac affair.

In December 2024, following Nicolas Sarkozy's final conviction and sentence to one year of imprisonment under electronic monitoring for corruption and influence peddling in the wiretapping affair, Arfi described the ruling as "historic". He noted that it marked the first time a French president had been convicted of a corruption offence, highliting the significance of the decision in French politics.

Fabrice Arfi is one of the French journalists who are members of the International Consortium of Investigative Journalists (ICIJ), alongside Karl Laske, also a journalis at Mediapart, freelance journalist Aurore Gorius, and Édouard Perrin, a journalist at Premières Lignes Télévision,

Arfi is one of the spokesperson for Informer n'est pas un délit, a journalists' collective formed in 2015 that campaigns against the introduction of legislation on trade-secret protection into French law.

== Books ==
In 2018, he devoted his book D'argent et de sang to VAT fraud involving carbon emission allowances, which he described as the "biggest fraud in French history". In 2023–2024, Canal+ broadcast a television series Of Money and Blood adaption directed by Xavier Giannoli.

In November 2024, he published La Troisième Vie, an in-depth investigation into Vincenzo Benedetto, a Romanian who settled in France in 1969 and was suspected of being a spy. Arfi spent fifteen years tracing Benedetto's life, examining archives and following leads to uncover a story involving espionage and French politics.

== Publications ==
- Le Contrat. Karachi, l'affaire que Sarkozy voudrait oublier, in collaboration with Fabrice Lhomme, Stock, 2010.
- L'Affaire Bettencourt, un scandale d'État, in collaboration with Fabrice Lhomme and the editorial staff of Mediapart, Don Quichotte, 2010.
- L'Affaire Cahuzac. En bloc et en détail, in collaboration with the editorial staff of Mediapart, 2013.
- Le Sens des affaires, Calmann-Lévy, 2014.
- La République sur écoute - Chroniques d'une France sous surveillance, in collaboration with the editorial staff of Mediapart, Don Quichotte, 2015.
- Avec les compliments du Guide, with Karl Laske, Fayard, 2017.
- D'argent et de sang, Seuil, 2018 ISBN 978-2021354447
- Sarkozy-Kadhafi. Des billets et des bombes, La Revue dessinée/Delcourt, 2019
- Pas tirés d'affaires, Seuil, 2022
- La Troisième Vie, Seuil, 2024

== Filmography ==
- L'argent, le sang et la démocratie, à propos de l'affaire Karachi, directed by Jean-Christophe Klotz, 2013
- Personne n'y comprend rien, directed by Yannick Kergoat, 2024

== Awards and honours ==
- Anticor Ethics Prize in 2015,
- Journalism Book Prize at the Assises du journalisme in 2016
- Jean-Daniel Prize in 2025 for La Troisième Vie (Éditions du Seuil)
- Christophe de Ponfilly Prize in 2026, awarded by the Société civile des auteurs multimédia for his investigative work—its methodological rigour, perseverance and independence—which helped uncover several major political and financial scandals over the previous twenty years.

== See also ==
- Of Money and Blood
- Mediapart
