= Gaddaf al dam =

Gaddaf al dam is a surname. Notable people with the surname include:

- Ahmed Gaddaf al-Dam, Libyan politician (born 1952)
- Sayyid Gaddaf al-Dam, Libyan brigadier general (born 1948)
