= Gérard Davet =

French investigative journalist

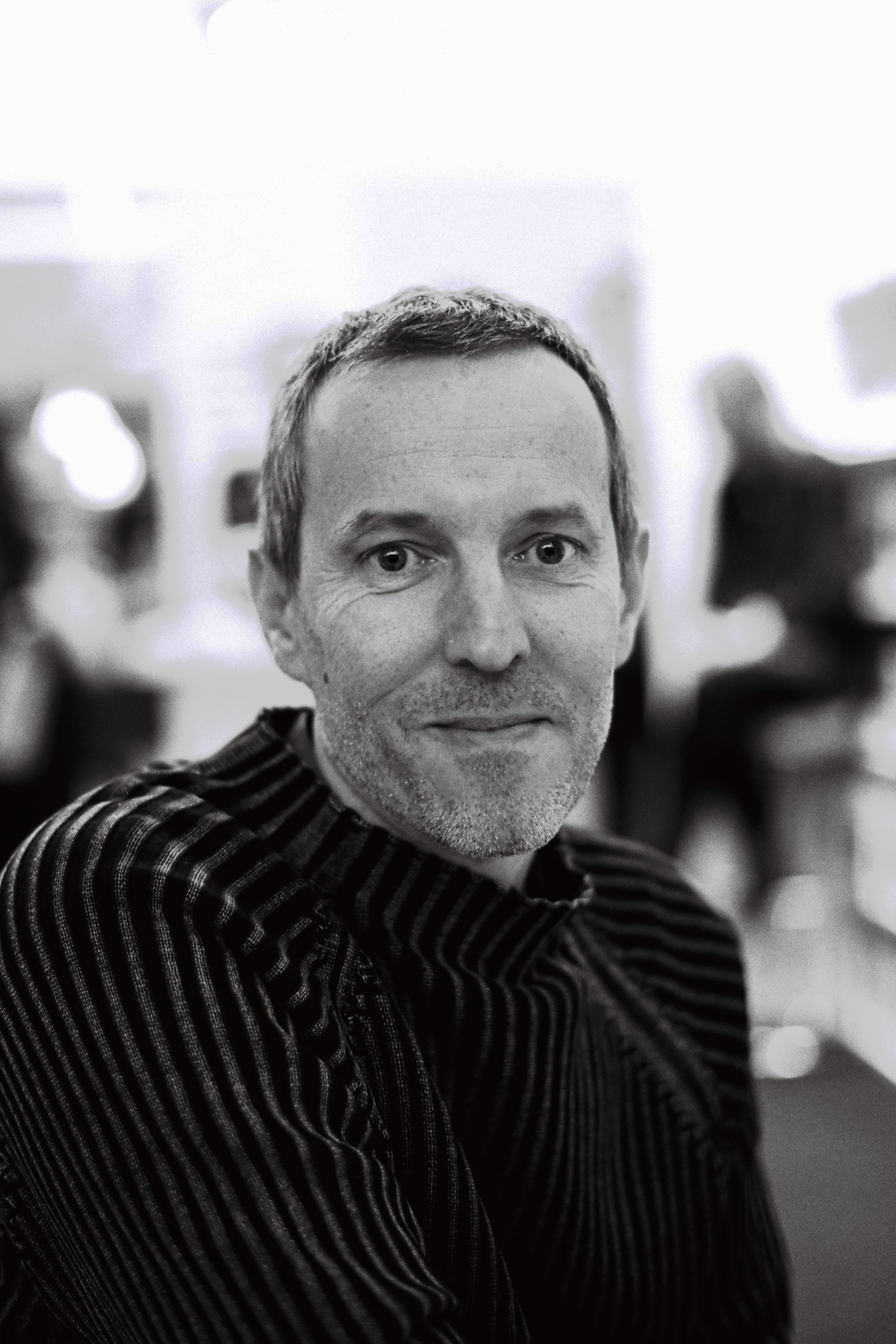
- Gérard Davet in 2012
- Born: 25 August 1966 (age 59); Courbevoie, France
- Education: Institut Pratique du Journalisme
- Occupation: Investigative journalist
- Employer: Le Monde

Gérard Davet (born 1966) is a French investigative journalist for Le Monde.

== Early life ==
Gérard Davet was born on August 25, 1966. His father is a salesman and his mother is a teacher. He grew up in Meudon-la-Forêt.

== Career ==
Davet became a journalist for Le Parisien in 1989. He has been an investigative journalist for Le Monde since 2011. In October 2010, as he was reporting on the Bettencourt affair, his apartment was broken in, with only a laptop and GPS device stolen from the premises. In March 2014, he received a threatening letter linked to some investigative work he was doing.

Davet is the co-author of several books with Fabrice Lhomme. Two books, Sarko m'a tuer and Sarko s'est tuer, are about President Nicolas Sarkozy. Another book, L'homme qui voulut être roi, is about Gaston Flosse. Two more books, French corruption and La clef : révélations sur la fraude fiscale du siècle, are about allegations of political corruptions and tax evasion in France. Their sixth book, "Un président ne devrait pas dire ça...", is based on interviews with President François Hollande.

== Works ==
- Davet, Gérard; Lhomme, Fabrice (2011). Sarko m'a tuer. Paris: Stock. ISBN 9782234069510. OCLC 755061219.
- Davet, Gérard; Lhomme, Fabrice (2013). L'homme qui voulut être roi. Paris: Stock. ISBN 9782234064591. OCLC 852117608.
- Davet, Gérard; Lhomme (2013). French corruption. Paris: Stock. ISBN 9782234075405. OCLC 866826135.
- Davet, Gérard; Lhomme (2014). Sarko s'est tuer. Paris: Stock. ISBN 9782234078987. OCLC 898457832.
- Davet, Gérard; Lhomme (2015). La clef : révélations sur la fraude fiscale du siècle. Paris: Stock. ISBN 9782234080379. OCLC 911263482.
- Davet, Gérard; Lhomme, Fabrice (2016). "Un président ne devrait pas dire ça...". Paris: Stock. ISBN 9782234075481.
- Davet, Gérard; Lhomme, Fabrice (2018). "Inch'Allah : l'islamisation à visage découvert". Paris: Fayard. ISBN 2213705895.
