= Bashir Saleh =

Libyan businessman (born 1946)

Bashir Saleh Bashir (Arabic: بشير صالح بشير; born July 24, 1946) is a former aide of former Libyan leader Muammar Gaddafi. He was head of the Libyan African Portfolio, a sovereign wealth fund that invested Libya's oil wealth mostly in sub-Saharan Africa, and served as an intermediary between Libya, Africa and France. Bashir was captured after the Battle of Tripoli during the Libyan Civil War, but later escaped. Libya demanded that he be extradited because it was believed he was in France. Bashir spent Libya's oil money solely for the Gaddafi family, buying up hotels, mineral resources and shares in companies, eventually becoming what some Libyan officials and financial experts describe as one of the largest single investors in Africa. Libyan authorities believe that finding him is the key to finding $7 billion in missing Libyan funds. He is a close associate of French businessman Jean-Yves Ollivier.

== Biography ==
=== Early and personal life ===
Saleh was born in Traghan, Murzuq District on 24 July 1946. He is from the Beni Meskine tribe, which originated in Morocco. His father was a nurse. He attended the same school in Sebha as Muammar Gaddafi, who was 4 years his senior, but they did not know each other. He later attended schools in Murzuk and Tripoli, where he obtained a degree in science and mathematic. After his graduation in 1967, he returned to Murzuk to work as a teacher. By his own account, he drove a Renault 16, bought a house, got married, and had no interest in politics during this period.

His wife is Lebanese and they have four children. In 2013, his wife Kafa Kachour was sentenced to two years in prison (one suspended) and a $150,000 euro fine for "domestic slavery" by a court in Lyon. On appeal, his wife was ordered to pay $222,500 euro to four Tanzanian and a Nigerian servants for "domestic slavery" in 2015. As of 2017, Bashir and his wife had not paid either the fine or compensation. He speaks fluent French and often served as Gaddafi's translator with French officials.

=== Political career ===
After the 1969 Libyan coup d'état brought Gaddafi to power, Saleh joined the Arab Socialist Union and quickly rose through the ranks. He was chosen as the second-in-command in Fezzan by the Libyan Revolutionary Command Council. In 1974, the RCC selected Saleh as governor of Fezzan and Saleh met Gaddafi in person for the first time. In 1975, he joined the General People's Committee and sat in the General People's Congress.

From 1976 to 1979, Saleh served as ambassador to the Central African Republic, where he forged a strong relationship with Jean-Bédel Bokassa and learned to speak French. Gaddafi had just converted Bokassa to Islam before Saleh's appointment. As ambassador, Saleh witnessed Bokassa's declaration of the Central African Empire with himself as the emperor and tried to warn Bokassa of France's intention to overthrow him. In 1977, Saleh played a leading role in securing the release of French archaeologist Françoise Claustre and her husband, who had been kidnapped by Hissène Habré. From 1980 to 1984, Saleh served as Libya's ambassador to Tanzania, where Julius Nyerere became one of his mentors. In 1984 to 1986, he served as ambassador to Algeria.

In 1986, Saleh was recalled to Libya to again serve as governor of Murzuk and later in Sebha. In 1990, he was appointed as Foreign Relations Secretary of the General People's Congress. In 1994, Gaddafi appointed Saleh the Director of State Protocol. From 1998 to 2006, he served as Gaddafi's chief of staff. He played a key role in transitioning the Organization of African Unity to the African Union and Gaddafi's rapprochement with the West. From 2006 to 2009, he headed the $8 billion Libyan African Investment Portfolio. In the spring of 2009, he was removed as the head of the fund and sidelined by the Gaddafi regime after a rivalry with Gaddafi's son Saif al-Islam and Prime Minister Baghdadi Mahmudi. He retired to his farm 40 km from Tripoli.

=== Libyan Civil War ===
Saleh ran several missions on behalf of Gaddafi during the First Libyan Civil War due to his close ties to France and Françafrique. He met with French Foreign Minister Alain Juppé, Interior Minister Claude Guéant, and Qatari Foreign Minister Hamad Ibn Jassem. In June 2011, he allegedly met with French President Nicolas Sarkozy at the Pavillon de la Lanterne in Versailles, where Sarkozy stated that he felt "cheated" by Gaddafi due to all the contracts that Gaddafi promised to French companies that were never signed. Saleh then embarked on a mission with former French Prime Minister Dominique de Villepin to negotiate a safe exit for Gaddafi.

On 22 August 2011, Saleh, who had taken refuge in his ranch south of Tripoli, was captured by the Zintan brigades. The commander of the militia contacted French special forces, who placed Saleh under house arrest for three months. During his house arrest, Saleh worked his extensive network by calling Amadou Toumani Touré, Mahamadou Issoufou, Blaise Compaoré, Denis Sassou Nguesso, Jacob Zuma, and Abdoulaye Wade to lobby for his freedom. He learned of Gaddafi's death from television. On 13 November 2011, the chairman of the National Transitional Council, Mustafa Abdul Jalil, ordered Saleh's release after the intervention of France and South Africa. Saleh left Libya by car to Tunisia and stayed a week in Hammamet while his French visa was being arranged by Boris Boillon, the French ambassador to Tunisia. In late November 2011, Saleh boarded a Swiss private jet registered to French businessman Alexandre Djouhri and flew to France.

=== Exile ===
In January 2012, Bashir was sighted in Mangaung while attending the centenary celebration of the African National Congress. On March 8, 2012, Bashir was given an advisory role by Niger and issued a diplomatic passport. On March 15, 2012, Niger claimed that his diplomatic passport was rescinded in order to defuse tensions with the new Libyan government.

Saleh's presence in France became a campaign issue in the 2012 French presidential election due to his role in alleged Libyan financing in the 2007 French presidential election. In May 2012, French President Nicolas Sarkozy confirmed that Bashir was in France and expressed his country's willingness to cooperate with Interpol if Bashir was wanted by the new Libyan government. French Prime Minister Francois Fillon claimed that Bashir's diplomatic passport from Niger was still valid. Due to the fact that Sarkozy was projected to lose the election to Francois Hollande, Saleh left France on 3 May 2012. Despite Libya's demand, Bashir was ultimately not extradited from France to Libya.

On 9 May 2012, he was reportedly in Senegal. In March 2013, Saleh was sighted at a BRICS summit in Durban. In May 2013, he was sighted at the Michelangelo Hotel, which allegedly had ties to Gaddafi, in Johannesburg. Despite being on Interpol's wanted list, he appeared to be traveling freely between South Africa, Niger, and Swaziland.

On February 23, 2018, Saleh was injured in an apparent carjacking at or near his home in Johannesburg. The assailants pulled him out of his car and shot him, before escaping in the vehicle.

=== Return to politics ===
Due to the resignation of President of South Africa Jacob Zuma and being shot in a carjacking, Saleh no longer felt safe in South Africa and relocated to Abu Dhabi in 2018. He was accused by supporters of Saif al-Islam Gaddafi of passing Libya's secrets to the UAE.

On November 19, 2021, a private jet carrying Saleh landed at the Sabha Airbase and Saleh declared his candidacy for president in the since postponed 2021 Libyan presidential election. His return to Libya was reportedly orchestrated by the UAE with tacit approval from Khalifa Haftar.

On November 24, 2021, the Libyan High Electoral Commission (HNEC) invalidated Bashir Saleh's presidential candidacy.

In September 2022, Bashir confirmed Gaddafi funded Sarkozy's campaign in the 2007 French presidential election.

== See also ==
- Alleged Libyan financing in the 2007 French presidential election
