= Ahmed Gaddaf al-Dam =

Libyan politician (born 1952)

- أحمد قذاف الدم
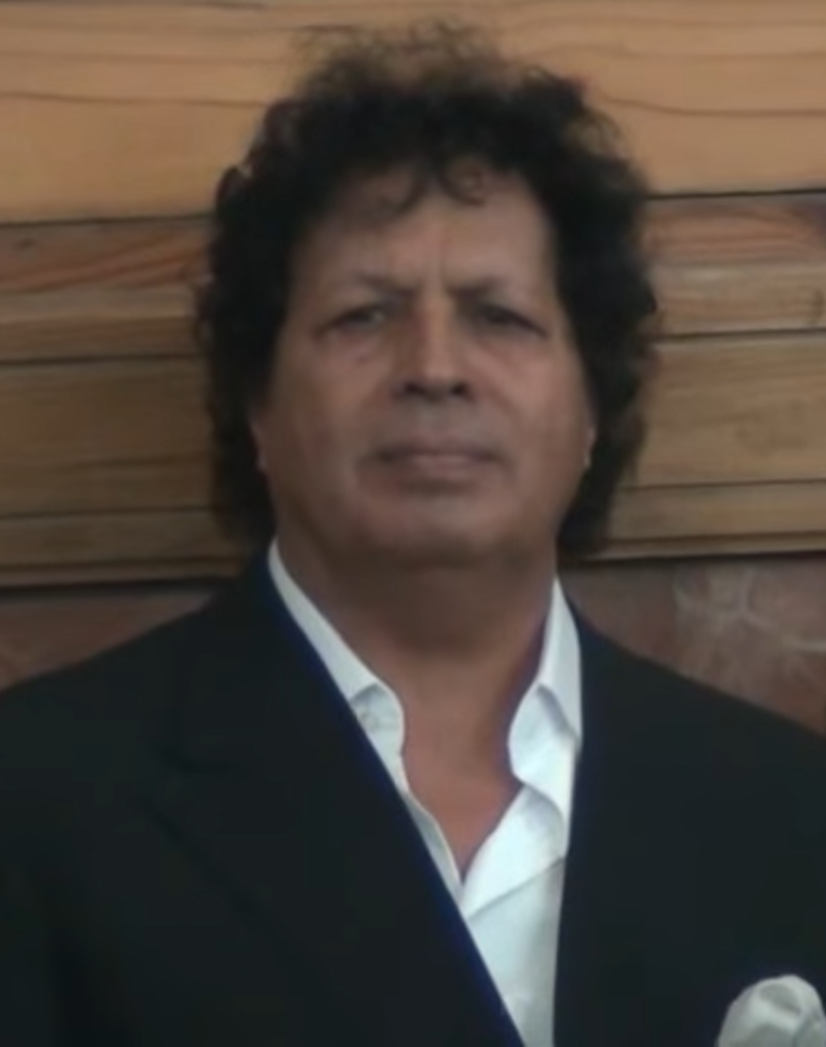
- Gaddaf al-Dam in 2015
- Born: 1952 (age 73–74); Marsa Matrouh, Egypt
- Occupations: Politician, diplomat, envoy
- Relatives: Muammar al-Gaddafi (cousin); Sayyid Gaddaf al-Dam (brother)

Ahmed Gaddaf al-Dam (Arabic: أحمد قذاف الدم; born 1952) is a cousin and former aide of erstwhile Libyan leader Muammar Gaddafi. He is Libya's former Special Envoy to Egypt and was a leading figure of the Gaddafi regime and a key member of Gaddafi's inner circle. Much of his prominence came through his role as a foreign diplomat for the regime. After the outbreak of the Libyan civil war, he fled to Egypt. Following the end of the civil war, he remained politically active, including calling for reconciliation between Gaddafi loyalists and the government.

== Biography ==
=== Early life ===
Born to a Libyan father and an Egyptian mother in Marsa Matrouh in Egypt, Gaddaf al-Dam was educated in military academies and schools in the United Kingdom (where he was classmates with current Egyptian President Abdel Fattah el-Sisi), Turkey, and Pakistan. His maternal uncles live in the Beheira Governorate in Egypt, and they are from the Awlad Ali tribe, which are tribes located historically in the areas near the Egypt–Libya border. He was a cousin of Muammar Gaddafi and cousin of Said Gaddaf al-Dam, a brigadier general who was described as the second most powerful person in Libya during the 1980s.

=== Career under Gaddafi ===
Gaddaf al-Dam had a role in Gaddafi's security services, commanding Gaddafi's security battalion in Tobruk, and served as a personal representative of Muammar Gaddafi in his relations with foreign heads of state. He was instrumental in funneling Libyan cash and weapons to anti-apartheid activists in South Africa and Robert Mugabe's movement against white minority rule in Zimbabwe. Despite starting out in the Gaddafi regime as a military officer and being a trusted confidant, Gaddaf al-Dam mainly served the Libyan government abroad as a foreign diplomat. He eventually became Libya's ambassador to Saudi Arabia. He later served as Libya's envoy to Egypt and resided in an apartment in the island of Zamalek, which he returned to after the end of the Libyan Civil War. Following the restoration of relations between Libya and Egypt in 1989, Gaddaf al-Dam would primarily live in Cairo, with his role as coordinator of relations between Egypt and Libya being regarded as more important than that of the ambassador.

=== Libyan Civil War and flight to Egypt ===
In February 2011, Gaddaf al-Dam fled to Egypt shortly after the start of the civil war. Initially, he claimed he had defected, declaring that he was "resigning from all official duties as a means of protest against the way the Libyan crisis was being handled." However, he took a more neutral stance mere weeks later and was sighted in Damascus, fueling speculation that his defection was a ruse to run a secret mission to Syria.

As one of several high-profile Gaddafi loyalists living in Egypt, he was pursued by the new Libyan government and Interpol since the end of the war. In March 2013, after Egyptian police surrounded his home in Cairo and clashed with his guards, Gaddaf al-Dam was arrested by Egyptian authorities on charges of forging official government documents. He was soon acquitted after his lawyers argued that he held an Egyptian passport due to his mother and that he had defected from Gaddafi due to his objection to the killing of protesters. He would also be charged with attempted murder after he reportedly shot at two police officers during the March 2013 raid, with one of these officers also being injured, but would be acquitted of this charge as well in December 2013.

=== Political activities from abroad ===
Gaddaf al-Dam expressed interest in participating in Libyan peace talks. He denied Libya's involvement in the 1988 Lockerbie Bombing, but acknowledged Gaddafi's involvement in the 1986 West Berlin discotheque bombing.

He endorsed the leadership bid of former Gaddafi foe, Field Marshal Khalifa Haftar and called for reconciliation and the release of Gaddafi loyalists held in Libyan prisons. He named Gaddafi's son and former heir apparent, Saif al-Islam Gaddafi, who was released by a militia in Zintan but whose whereabouts was unclear, as someone who needed to be involved in the ongoing peace process.

He called the arrest of Nicolas Sarkozy, former President of France, on preliminary charges of illegally funding his campaign, passive corruption and receiving money from Libyan embezzlement (alleged Libyan financing in the 2007 French presidential election), "God’s punishment." Gaddaf al-Dam claimed he had knowledge of the money transfers and alleged most of the senior Gaddafi regime figures involved in the scandal were imprisoned, dead or in hiding, fearing assassination, including Gaddafi's treasurer Bashir Saleh Bashir, who had survived a shooting in South Africa in February 2018, and Shukri Ghanem, Gaddafi's oil minister who was found drowned to death in the Danube River in Vienna in 2012.

Gaddaf al-Dam spoke out against the Turkish intervention in Libya and warned Recep Tayyip Erdoğan of repercussions. Gaddaf al-Dam accused the UN and NATO of causing the political crisis in Libya since 2011. He stated that NATO's 2011 military intervention in Libya was based on falsehoods.

In 2021, Gaddaf al-Dam predicted that Saif al-Islam Gaddafi would win the Libyan presidential election. In November 2021, he allegedly brokered a secret meeting in Egypt between Egyptian President Abdel Fattah el-Sisi, Egyptian Chief of Intelligence Abbas Kamel, and Saif al-Islam Gaddafi, which resulted in Saif's reinstatement as a candidate in the 2021 Libyan presidential election. He called for the government of Lebanon to release Hannibal Gaddafi from detention.
