= Bernard Monot =

French economist and politician (born 1962)

Bernard Monot MEP

Member of the European Parliament for Massif-central–Centre
- Incumbent
- Assumed office 1 July 2014

Personal details
- Born: 3 July 1962 (age 64) Nice, France
- Party: National Front (2014-18); Debout la France (2018-present)
- Education: HEC Paris

Bernard Monot (French: [bɛʁnaʁ mɔno]; born 3 July 1962) is a French economist and politician and Member of the European Parliament representing Massif-central–Centre.

Formerly a member of the National Front (FN), Monot left the party in May 2018 to join Debout la France. Monot cited the FN's support for leaving the eurozone and a lack of attention to social and economic issues as reasons for leaving the party.

Bernard Monot attended a higher business school and obtained a Master's degree in economics between 1982 and 1988; then he studied at HEC Paris in 1998-1999.
