= Catherine Soullie =

French politician

Catherine Soullie (born 18 July 1954, in Cite d'Aunis) is a French politician who served as a Member of the European Parliament from 2009 until 2011, representing the Massif Central-Centre constituency.

In the 2009 European elections, Soullie was the fourth candidate on the Union for a Popular Movement list in the Massif Central-Centre region - which made her election quasi-impossible in the 5-seat constituency. However, Brice Hortefeux, then-Minister of Labour, third candidate on the list, was elected due to the UMP's surprisingly good result. However, he preferred to continue in the government and Soullie, as fourth candidate on the list, replaced him.
