= Murder in Paris '68 =

2026 non-fiction book by Edward Chisholm

Murder in Paris '68: A True Story of Death and Glamour
- Author: Edward Chisholm
- Language: English
- Subject: Death of Stevan Marković
- Genre: True crime
- Publisher: Monoray (Octopus Publishing Group)
- Publication date: 2026
- Publication place: United Kingdom
- Media type: Print

Murder in Paris '68: A True Story of Death and Glamour is a 2026 non-fiction book by the British writer Edward Chisholm. It is his second book, following A Waiter in Paris (2022). The book reconstructs the unsolved 1968 killing of Stevan Marković, a Yugoslav associate of the French film star Alain Delon, whose body was found on the outskirts of Paris that October. It was longlisted for the 2026 Baillie Gifford Prize for non-fiction.

== Summary ==
The book centres on Marković, a Yugoslav fixer and hanger-on in Delon's circle whose death, in what became known as the Marković affair, implicated figures close to the actor. Chisholm sets the case against the backdrop of Paris in the late 1960s, including the French New Wave film movement and the student protests of May 1968. The case remains formally unsolved.

== Reception ==
Reviewing the book for The Irish Times, the critic called it an enthralling account of a scandal that still seems hard to believe, and situated Delon's fame in 1968 within the wider history of French and international cinema of the period. The book was named one of The Sunday Times's best non-fiction books to read in summer 2026, and was longlisted for the 2026 Baillie Gifford Prize for non-fiction.
