= Boris Boillon =

French diplomat (born 1969)

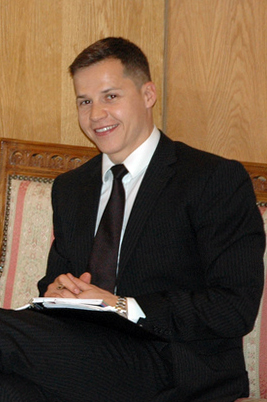
- Boris Boillon, January 2012
- Born: Pontarlier, France
- Education: Sciences Po, INALCO
- Occupation: Diplomat

Boris Boillon was the French ambassador to Tunisia until 24 August 2012. Previously, he was ambassador to Iraq.

== Early life ==
Arabic-speaker, Boris Boillon spent his childhood in Béjaïa, where his father, an English professor, and his mother, a schoolteacher, were based in the 1960s and '70s.

== Career ==
=== First steps in diplomacy ===
Boillon Boris graduated from the Institut d'Études Politiques de Paris and the Institut national des langues et civilisations orientales. After a mission to the sultanate of Oman in Muscat from 1993 to 1994, he was admitted to the competition for access to employment of foreign affairs advisor (East part) in 1998. He was then appointed editor of Foreign Policy and Security Service Joint Headquarters (1999–2001) and advisor to the French embassy in Algiers (2001–2004). Between August 2004 and April 2006, he was Consul-General Jerusalem as deputy special representative of the European Union for the peace process in the Middle East. Later, he was Special Adviser to the Ministry of Interior and Spatial Planning (mission to the European and International Affairs).

In January 2007, Boris Boillon became diplomatic adviser to the Minister of State and Minister of the Interior and Regional Planning Nicolas Sarkozy and retained this role under François Baroin, Minister Interior and Spatial Planning, until April of that year. Following the victory of Nicolas Sarkozy in the presidential election, Boris Boillon became "North Africa, Near and Middle East" advisor to the Presidency of the Republic.

With Claude Gueant, Boris Boillon worked on the issue of Bulgarian nurses held in Libya. He organized the visit to Paris in December 2007 Gaddafi whom he has often supported. Became ambassador, he says, and the end of 2010:

Kadhafi used to be a terrorist but he is no longer.(...) He has admitted he made mistakes. We all make mistakes and we all have the right to a second chance.

— Boris Boillon, Le Grand Journal (Canal+)

In his passage in Le Grand Journal in November 2010, he acknowledged that the supreme leader of Libya, Muammar Gaddafi, calls him "my son".

=== Ambassador to Iraq (2009–2011) ===
Boris Boillon is officially appointed by the Council of Ministers ambassador of France in Iraq in July 2009. The ambassador, who is responsible among other things competing for contracts, and said the magazine Challenges

The Iraq reconstruction is the market of the century : 600 billion dollars! France must be at the forefront.

— Boris Boillon, Challenges Magazine

Supporting U.S. intervention in Iraq, Ambassador sees himself criticized for his comments by the researcher of the Institut de relations internationales et stratégiques Pascal Boniface.

Boillon defends his record:

When I arrived in Baghdad, I had three axes and I have implemented decisively theses axes: building trust, because sorry for French pride but not everyone has loved our position in 2003. Iraqi leaders told me "It is not thanks to France we are here" Strengthen the rule of law and citizenship. And the last line of my report, it is economic. I was reduced to that and it is maybe my fault. I'm not only an economic ambassador but in 2010, it exported $ 800 million, almost three times more than in 2008. And for me the word enterprise is not an insult. (...) Mission accomplished! With a staff of 10, it was as well ... that the U.S. embassy, where they are 3000!

— Boris Boillon

In an interview with the Figaro in August 2010, Boris Boillon said:

Iraq is the true laboratory of democracy in the Arab world. It is there that the future of democracy in the region will play itself out. Iraq could potentially become a political model for its neighbors. And, whether one likes it or not, all this has come about thanks to the American intervention of 2003.

— Boris Boillon, Le Figaro Magazine

=== Ambassador to Tunisia (2011–2012) ===
On February 9, 2011 Boillon is appointed ambassador of France in Tunis instead of Pierre Ménat that the costs of errors of assessment by the French foreign policy at the Tunisian revolution.

Arrived in Tunis on February 16, he is responsible, according to the spokesperson of the Quai d'Orsay, "a new momentum, based on a new shared ambition" to renew ties between the people of Tunisia and France . His appointment does not, however, unanimously. Former ambassador Charles Crettien published an article in Le Monde to describe this choice as "shocking" or even "dangerous".

Shortly after taking office, Boillon invited Tunisian journalists to the embassy but stirred controversy after he insulted them by dismissing a question about the handling of the Tunisian crisis by Michèle Alliot-Marie as "daft" and calling the journalists "morons" and "no one" before abruptly stopping the interview. Several hundred people protest on Feb. 19 at the embassy, demanding his departure and denouncing his "lack of diplomacy" and his "aggressiveness". The same evening, he apologized on Tunisian national television to the journalists and to all Tunisians.

Often described as a wonder boy ambitious and proactive, is calling himself a Sarko product, its style is the subject various comments in the French press and Tunisian who remind that one of the slogans of the "Jasmine Revolution" was "Dignity".

== Trivia ==
He was appointed Knight of the Legion of Honour on December 31, 2010, thanks to his involvement in the HIV trial in Libya

He was arrested July 31, 2013 by a French Customs Officer at Paris, Gare Du Nord, holding €350,000 and $40,000 in cash while on his way to Brussels.
