= Laurent Castillo =

French politician (born 1962)

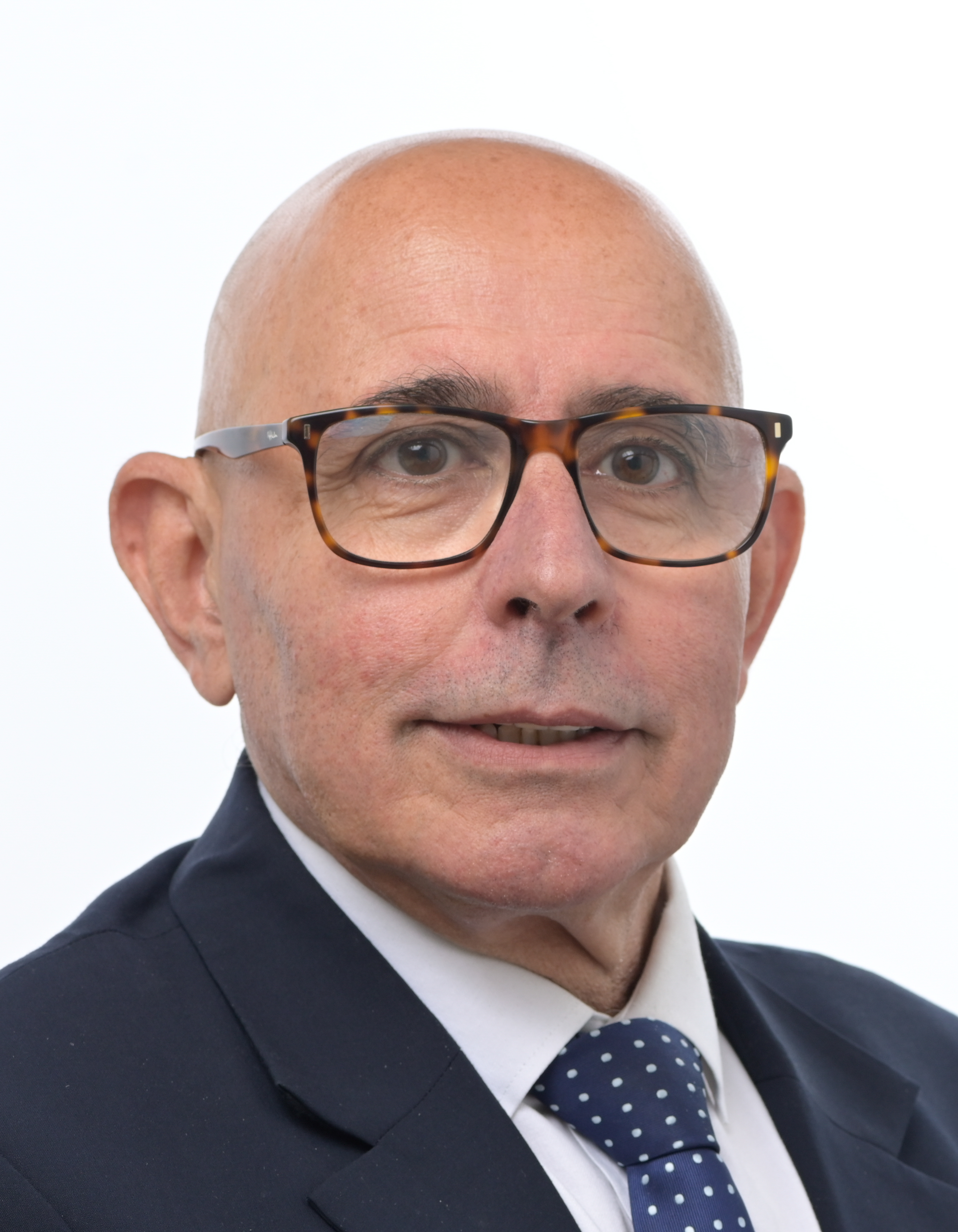
- Official portrait, 2024

Senator
- Incumbent
- Assumed office 1 October 2026

Member of the European Parliament
- In office 16 July 2024 – 28 September 2026
- Succeeded by: Brice Hortefeux
- Constituency: France

Personal details
- Born: 12 March 1962 (age 64) Casablanca, Morocco
- Citizenship: France
- Party: UDR (2024–present)
- Other political affiliations: LR (2015–2024)
- Education: Université Nice-Sophia-Antipolis
- Occupation: Otolaryngologist, medicine professor

Laurent Castillo (French pronunciation: [lɔʁɑ̃ kastijo]; born 12 March 1962) is a French politician of the Union of the Right for the Republic (UDR) who has been a member of the Senate since 1 October 2026. He was previously a Member of the European Parliament (MEP) from 2024 to 2026, having been elected in the 2024 election on the list presented by The Republicans (LR). He is a surgeon and university professor by occupation.

Following the 2024 The Republicans alliance crisis, Castillo joined Éric Ciotti's new UDR party as its sole MEP, having been described as a close ally to Ciotti. Previously, he ran for the National Assembly in the 2022 legislative election, placing fourth in the first round in the 3rd constituency of Alpes-Maritimes.

Castillo became a senator on 1 October 2026 and consequently left the European Parliament, as the two mandates are incompatible. His seat was taken by Brice Hortefeux, the next available candidate on the 2024 LR list, on 8 October 2026.

== See also ==
- List of members of the European Parliament (2024–2029)
