= Brice Hortefeux =

French politician (born 1958)

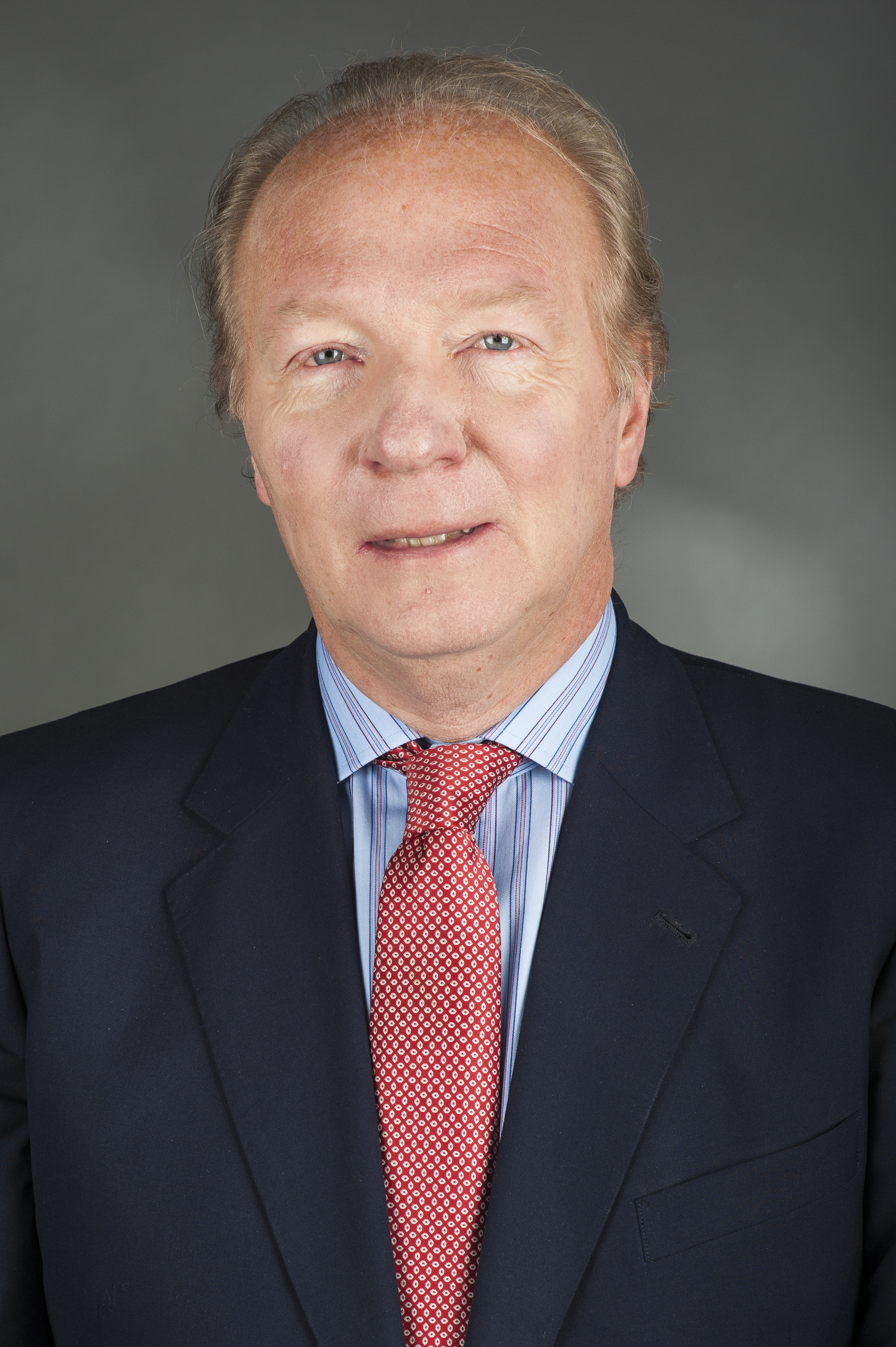
- Brice Hortefeux in 2014

Member of the European Parliament
- Incumbent
- Assumed office 8 October 2026
- Preceded by: Laurent Castillo
- Constituency: France

Member of the European Parliament
- In office 24 March 2011 – 15 July 2024
- Preceded by: Catherine Soullie
- Constituency: Massif-central–Centre (2011–2019); France (2019–2024)

Member of the Regional council of Auvergne-Rhône-Alpes
- In office 4 January 2016 – 30 April 2026
- President: Laurent Wauquiez

Minister of the Interior
- In office 23 June 2009 – 27 February 2011
- President: Nicolas Sarkozy
- Prime Minister: François Fillon
- Preceded by: Michèle Alliot-Marie
- Succeeded by: Claude Guéant

Personal details
- Born: 11 May 1958 (age 68) Neuilly-sur-Seine, France
- Party: The Republicans (since 2015)
- Other political affiliations: UMP (2002–2015); RPR (Before 2002)
- Spouse: Valérie Dazzan (m. 2000)
- Children: 3
- Education: Lycée Saint-Jean de Passy
- Alma mater: Paris Nanterre University; Sciences Po
- Profession: Lawyer

Brice Hortefeux (French pronunciation: [bʁis ɔʁtəfø]; born 11 May 1958) is a French politician of The Republicans who has been a Member of the European Parliament since 8 October 2026, replacing Laurent Castillo. He previously served as an MEP from 1999 to 2005 and from 2011 to 2024.

A close ally of Nicolas Sarkozy, Hortefeux held several ministerial posts between 2005 and 2011. He was Minister of the Interior, Overseas Territories and Territorial Collectivities (2009–2011), and was also given responsibility for Immigration from November 2010. He had earlier been Minister of Immigration, Integration, National Identity and Co-development (2007–2009), Minister for Labour, Labour Relations, the Family, Solidarity and Urban Affairs (2009), and Minister-Delegate for Local Government at the Ministry of the Interior (2005–2007).

== Early life and education ==
Hortefeux was born in Neuilly-sur-Seine, Hauts-de-Seine but was raised in Auvergne.

- Degree in private law (1982)
- Master's degree in public law (1984)
- Studied at Sciences Po

== Political career ==
=== Early beginnings ===
- Local authority administrator (1986–1994) (worked in Neuilly-sur-Seine for mayor Nicolas Sarkozy)
- Regional councillor of Auvergne : Since 1992. Reelected in 1998, 2004, 2010.
- Prefect, given responsibility for a government public service mission (1995)
- Special adviser in the office of the President of the Senate (1998–1999)
- Head of office of the Minister for the Budget and Communications and government spokesman (1993–1995)

=== Career in government ===
- Minister of the Interior, Overseas, Local Authorities and Immigration : 2010–2011.
- Minister of the Interior, Overseas and Local authorities : 2009–2010.
- Minister of Labor, Family and Social Affairs, Solidarity and the City : January–June 2009.
- Minister for Immigration, Integration, National Identity and Development Solidarity : 2007–2009.
- Minister of Territorial collectivities : 2005–2007.

Hortefeux is considered one of the most loyal political allies, and personal friend, of French president Nicolas Sarkozy. He is the godfather of one of Nicolas Sarkozy's sons.

On 18 May 2007, he was appointed as the first Minister of Immigration, Integration, National Identity and Cooperative Development in the government of Prime Minister François Fillon. As such he has boosted the numbers of illegal immigrants forcibly repatriated from France, extended the network of detention centres (established also outside the larger conurbations in smaller cities such as Blois) and modified the rights of individuals and organizations which visit them.

He is in favor of controls on immigration. He was the promoter of a law that toughens conditions of political asylum in France. He believes that France has a right to expel or welcome immigrants on a discretionary basis, citing as evidence the high unemployment and criminality rates of foreigners. He also points to the geographical concentration of foreigners in a small number of towns as evidence that they are not integrated in the country. As he declared in the newspaper Le Parisien on 8 November 2007: "France has the right to choose which immigrants it can accommodate... Let's muster the courage to face our problems! Do you find it normal that 60% of immigrants are concentrated in only 3 of our 22 regions? That the unemployment rate of these people is 22% and that their children are dropping out of school? No, we will not accept this.".

On M6's TV show Capital, when asked if there were illegal immigrants in France, he replied: "If you dream of a country where there are only honest and clean citizens... In reality, it's a constant struggle."

In August 2010 following an earlier fatal incident involving travellers and gendarmerie at Thésée, near St. Aignan, Loir et Cher, Hortefeux has vigorously pursued a policy of destroying illegal travellers' camps and imposing conditions for voluntary repatriations of Roma (or gypsies) to Romania and Bulgaria, a considerable number of which are in progress. A circular emanating from his office (chief of staff : Michel Bart) on 5 August 2010, specifically mentioning an ethnic criterion for these deportations provoked the ire of ministerial colleagues such as Éric Besson and the European commissioner, Viviane Reding. An eirenic exchange with Cardinal André Vingt-Trois, the President of the French Bishops' Conference, representing contrasting reactions within the Catholic community, also ensued.

=== Member of the European Parliament ===
Hortefeux served as a Member of the European Parliament from 1999 to 2005, when he resigned upon joining the government, and again from 2011 to 2024. He was first elected in 1999 and re-elected in 2004. He headed the UMP list in the Massif-central–Centre constituency in 2009 but, being a government minister at the time, did not take up his seat until March 2011, after leaving the government. He was re-elected in 2014 and 2019. As a member of the Union for a Popular Movement and later The Republicans, he sat with the European People's Party group. During his time at the European Parliament, he sat on the Committee on International Trade, was a substitute for the Committee on Budgets and was a member of the delegation for relations with the Maghreb countries and the Arab Maghreb Union.

As part of a reorganization of the UMP's leadership under their chairman Jean-François Copé in January 2013, Hortefeux became – alongside Christian Estrosi, Henri de Raincourt, Jean-Claude Gaudin, Roger Karoutchi and Gérard Longuet – one of the party's six vice-presidents.

Ahead of the 2022 presidential elections, Hortefeux publicly declared his support for Valérie Pécresse as the Republicans’ candidate and joined her campaign team as special adviser on institutional reform.

Hortefeux was not reelected in 2024. On 8 October 2026, however, he returned as an MEP, replacing Laurent Castillo.

== Political positions ==
Hortefeux is a supporter of immigrant repatriation from France. He has supported and incentivised voluntary return, in his role as Immigration Minister of France, for immigrant families. In 2007, enhancing the offer to €6,000 per family to leave the country, he claimed that the French government "must increase this measure to help voluntary return".

== Controversy ==
On 10 September 2009, Le Monde disclosed a video showing Hortefeux at the UMP Summer School in Seignosse, France, on Saturday, 5 September 2009. As he posed for a photograph with a young man of Arabic origin, the following conversation can be heard (translation):

Female voice – He is Catholic, he eats pork and drinks beer!

Hortefeux – Oh really? Well, he does not match the prototype at all!

Female voice – He is one of us... he is our little Arab.

Hortefeux – We always need one! When there is only one, it's okay. It's when there are many that problems begin.

In June 2010, a French court found Hortefeux guilty of a racial insult, and fined him 750 euros with an order to donate 2,000 euros to an anti-racism group. Hortefeux' lawyer said that they would appeal the ruling.

== 2010 cargo plane bomb plot ==
On 4 November 2010, Hortefeux said that one of the two bombs in the 2010 cargo plane bomb plot was defused just 17 minutes before it was set to explode.

== See also ==
- Alleged Libyan interference in the 2007 French elections

Political offices
Preceded by Michèle Alliot-Marie	Minister of the Interior; 2009–2011	Succeeded by Claude Guéant
