= Alexandre Djouhri =

French businessman

- Born: 18 February 1959 (age 66); Saint Denis
- Occupation: Businessman

Alexandre Djouhri (born 18 February 1959) is a French businessman who served for some time as an unofficial middleman between French officials and different African regimes.

== Biography ==
In 1981 Djouhri was accused of armed robbery of a jewelry store but was later acquitted.

Les Échos has described him as a longtime, "important intermediary" in French foreign relations with North Africa. In the 1990s, Djouhri became an associate of Michel Roussin and, through him, met Jacques Chirac. He was later a confidante of Nicolas Sarkozy and was arrested for questioning over allegations of Libyan influence in the 2007 elections. He was also involved in the escape of Libyan intermediary Bashir Saleh to France in 2012, thus preventing the latter from being arrested and possibly providing damning information about the election interference.

Ziad Takieddine, another businessman involved in the Libyan interference, accused Djouhri in 2021 (during Takieddine's own trial in Lebanon) of having threatened to kill him with acid.

Djouhri lives in Geneva, Switzerland, where he is on the board of a directors of a water treatment and alternative energy company.
