= Marković affair =

1968 political scandal in France

The Marković affair was a political scandal in France in 1968 that followed the violent death of Stevan Marković, a friend and bodyguard of actor Alain Delon. The press speculated Delon was involved. Delon's longtime friend and gangster François Marcantoni was arrested and detained for a year, being bailed in 1969. The murder was never solved, the case having been dismissed in 1973 for lack of evidence.

In a further development, sexually-explicit photos, allegedly of Claude Pompidou, wife of French President Georges Pompidou, were found in Marković's car after his death. A former police chief, Lucien Aimé-Blanc, who was responsible for recovering the photos, stated that they had been planted by established Gaullist clans opposed to Pompidou, and their veracity was subsequently challenged.

== Life and death of Stevan Marković ==
Marković was born on 10 May 1937 in Belgrade. In the 1950s, Marković and his friend Milos Milos (Miloš Milošević) were involved in streetfighting in Belgrade. They met Delon, then a young movie star, who was making a film in Belgrade in co-production with Yugoslavian studios. Delon first employed Milos Milos and later Marković as his bodyguard. Marković was a friend of Serbian gangster Nikola Milinković and walked in the first column of the convoy of Nikola's burial.

A heavy gambler who was often suspected of cheating, Marković was known for his high-class parties at which it was alleged he would set up secret cameras throughout the house, especially in the bedrooms. He thus collected many compromising photos of the guests that could have damaged their social status. He approached several newspapers trying to sell them. Surprisingly, some of the photographs would be alleged to be directly targeting Delon and Marcantoni themselves. However, the most important photos that Marković supposedly possessed were scandalous shots of Pompidou's wife. That was a major concern to Pompidou, who was preparing to run for president.

On 1 October 1968, Marković's body was found in a public dump in the village of Élancourt, Yvelines, west of Paris. His murder is still unsolved.

== Involvement of Alain Delon and François Marcantoni ==
It was alleged that Delon became acquainted with "some highly dubious French gangland characters" and was a close friend of François Marcantoni. When Delon's bodyguard Marković mysteriously died, Marcantoni and Delon came under suspicion in part because of a letter written by Marković to his brother, Aleksandar, in which he implicated Delon and Marcantoni as guilty if any harm came to him.

Marcantoni was initially charged with the murder. However, after he was questioned by the police, the charges were eventually dropped, and the crime remains unsolved.

== Involvement of Pompidou ==
The death of Marković provoked many rumours, many suggesting the existence of group sex photos with Madame Pompidou. Georges Pompidou was then conducting his presidential campaign and wanted to dispel them as soon as possible. He formally told the public that the talk concerning the Marković affair was all rumours. While admitting that he and his wife had attended parties with Marković and Delon, Pompidou accused Louis Wallon and Henri Capitant of using the French espionage service SDECE to frame him. Some alleged that Pompidou ordered Marković's murder in revenge for the supposed photos of his wife. Even though he claimed the woman in the photos was a prostitute who simply resembled his wife, the rumours initially hurt Pompidou's campaign. After he nevertheless overcame the rumours and won the 1969 election, Pompidou appointed Alexandre de Marenches as the chief of the SDECE with instructions to reform it.

The affair is treated in episode 6 of the 2020 TV miniseries De Gaulle, l'éclat et le secret. There is a scene in which Pompidou appears at the home of president Charles De Gaulle, asking De Gaulle to intervene. De Gaulle responds that he had done all he could by instructing his aides to give Pompidou all the information available as soon as he himself learned of it; he advises Pompidou that scandal is a part of public life and that he should wait it out and move on. Dissatisfied, Pompidou responds that if the intent of the perpetrators had been to cause distress they had succeeded, but if it was to deter him politically they had failed.

According to some, the Marković affair was merely a ploy to damage Georges Pompidou's reputation by attacking the public image of his wife. Later, information proved that it was not Madame Pompidou in the photos but a prostitute who had been paid by a former police chief, Lucien Aimé-Blanc, with long connections to the SDECE. Aimé-Blanc claimed in his memoirs that an anonymous friend asked him to recruit a blonde-haired prostitute in her forties who was then used as Madame Pompidou's lookalike so she could be photographed in compromising positions with another woman.

== Aftermath and legacy ==
Bernard Violet wrote Les Mystères Delon, a book about Alain Delon, published in 2000. It was the first book in French legal history to have been banned by authorities before it was officially allowed to be sold, allegedly because Delon, one of the few surviving persons associated with the affair, sought to block its sale. However, the ban was eventually lifted, and the book was sold in France.

Murder in Paris '68: A True Story of Death and Glamor by Edward Chisholm (2026) traces the friendship between Marković and Delon. It explores the scandal's cultural and historical context.
