= François Marcantoni =

Corsican gangster and mob boss (1920–2010)

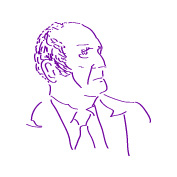
Portrait of Marcantoni

François Marcantoni (28 May 1920 – 17 August 2010) was a Corsican gangster and member of French Resistance. He died on 17 August 2010, aged 90 in Paris.

== Criminal career ==
In 1942, during World War II, Marcantoni participated in a sabotage operation in Toulon. He refused to collaborate with the regime of Vichy France. In the 1950s, he was involved in a series of bank robberies.

Marcantoni was under investigation in 1968 for the killing of Stevan Marković, a bodyguard for the film star Alain Delon. One of the factors pointing in his direction was a letter Markovic sent to his brother Aleksandar wherein he wrote: "If I get killed, it's 100% the fault of Alain Delon and his godfather François Marcantoni". Marcantoni spent 11 months in custody but was released in December 1969 because the prosecutor could not prove his guilt.

== Writer ==
Marcantoni wrote two books:

- Markovic affair - 1976
- Who killed Markovic? - 1985
