= Fabrice Lhomme =

French investigative journalist

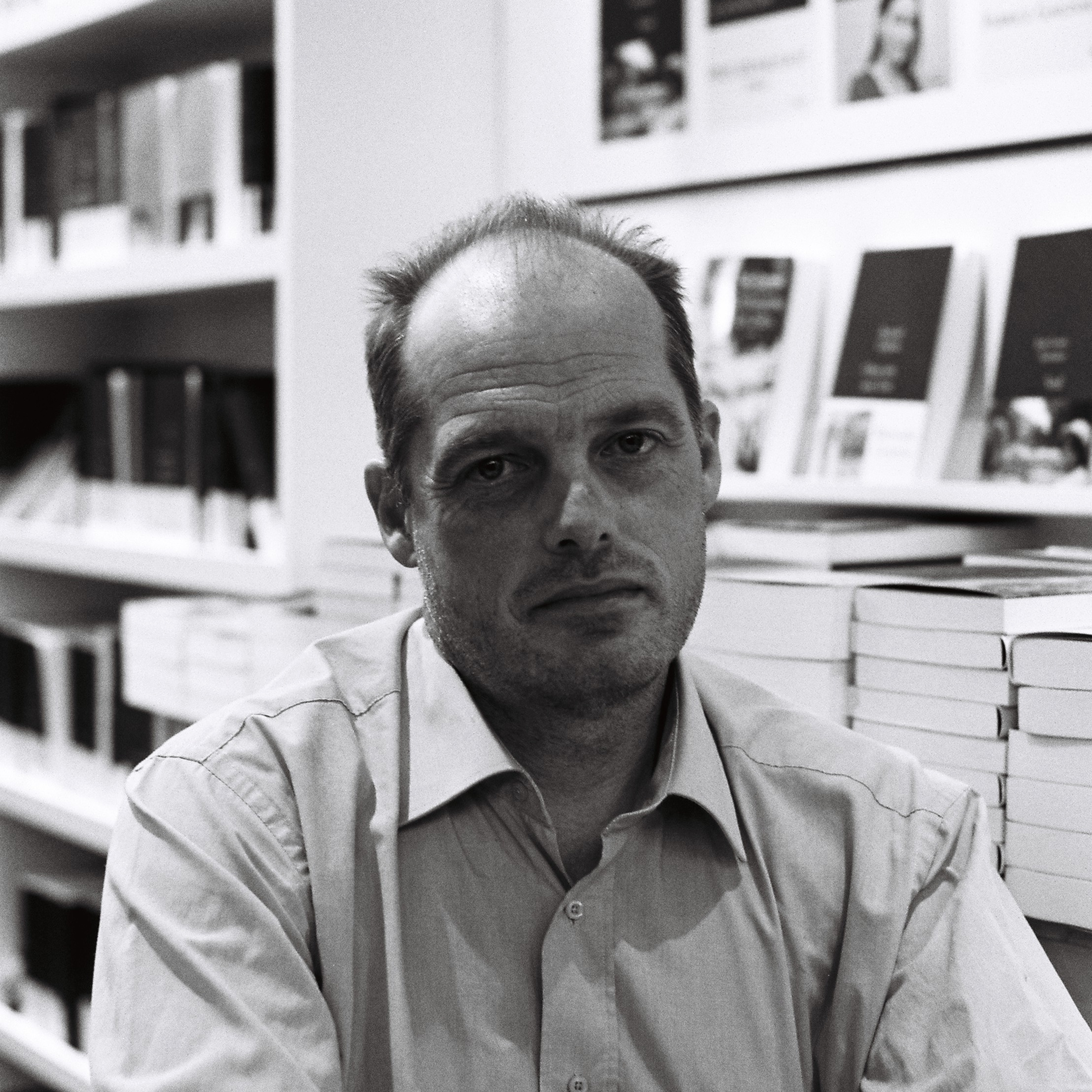
- Fabrice Lhomme in 2018
- Born: 17 November 1965 (age 60)
- Education: François Rabelais University
- Occupation: Journalist

Fabrice Lhomme (born 1965) is a French investigative journalist for Le Monde.

== Early life ==
Fabrice Lhomme was born on 17 November 1965. He was educated in a boarding school in Normandy. He attended François Rabelais University in Tours, where he studied History and Journalism, but he failed to graduate.

== Career ==
Lhomme became a journalist for Le Parisien in 1989. He has been an investigative journalist for Le Monde since 2011.

Lhomme is the co-author of several books with Gérard Davet. Two books, Sarko m'a tuer and Sarko s'est tuer, are about President Nicolas Sarkozy. Another book, L'homme qui voulut être roi, is about Gaston Flosse. Two more books, French corruption and La clef : révélations sur la fraude fiscale du siècle, are about allegations of political corruptions and tax evasion in France. Their sixth book, "Un président ne devrait pas dire ça...", is based on interviews with President Francois Hollande.

== Works ==
- Davet, Gérard; Lhomme, Fabrice (2011). Sarko m'a tuer. Paris: Stock. ISBN 9782234069510. OCLC 755061219.
- Davet, Gérard; Lhomme, Fabrice (2013). L'homme qui voulut être roi. Paris: Stock. ISBN 9782234064591. OCLC 852117608.
- Davet, Gérard; Lhomme (2013). French corruption. Paris: Stock. ISBN 9782234075405. OCLC 866826135.
- Davet, Gérard; Lhomme (2014). Sarko s'est tuer. Paris: Stock. ISBN 9782234078987. OCLC 898457832.
- Davet, Gérard; Lhomme (2015). La clef : révélations sur la fraude fiscale du siècle. Paris: Stock. ISBN 9782234080379. OCLC 911263482.
- Davet, Gérard; Lhomme, Fabrice (2016). "Un président ne devrait pas dire ça...". Paris: Stock. ISBN 9782234075481.
