= Ziad Takieddine =

Lebanese-French businessman (1950–2025)

- زياد تقي الدين
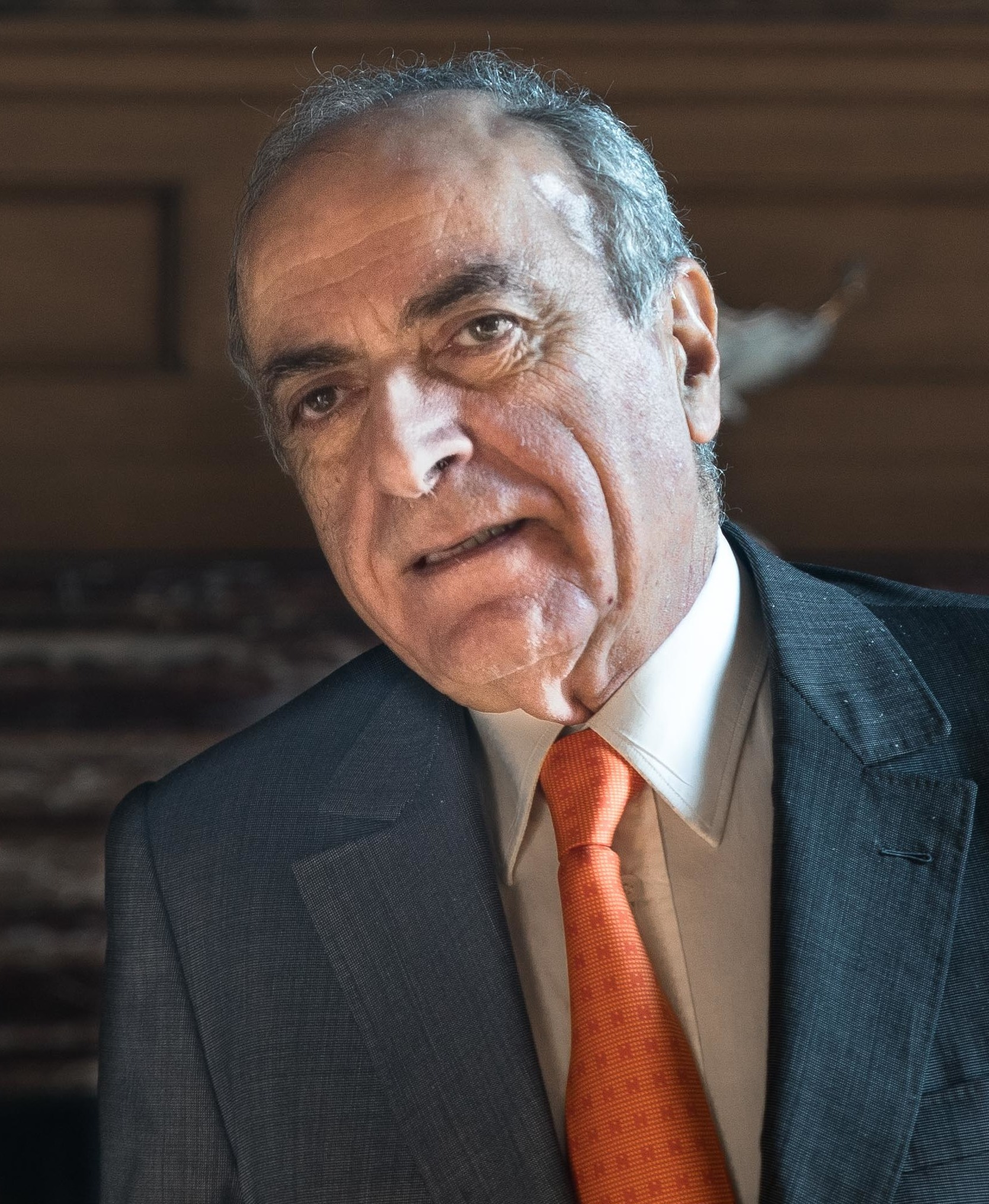
- Takieddine in 2017
- Born: 14 June 1950; Baakline, Lebanon
- Died: 23 September 2025 (aged 75); Beirut, Lebanon
- Education: American University of Beirut; University of Reading
- Occupation: Businessman
- Spouse: Nicola Johnson (divorced)
- Relatives: Amal Clooney (first cousin once removed)

Ziad Takieddine (Arabic: زياد تقي الدين, Zyād Taqī al-Dīn; 14 June 1950 – 23 September 2025) was a Lebanese-French businessman, described by The Daily Telegraph as an "arms broker".

== Early life ==
Takieddine was born in Baakline, Lebanon on 14 June 1950, into a Druze family. His uncle Saiid Takieddine was the Lebanese ambassador in London, and his father was ambassador to various nations. He was educated at the American University in Beirut and the University of Reading in England.

== Career ==
In the 1990s, Takieddine was the manager of the Isola 2000 ski resort in Isola, Alpes-Maritimes, France.

He later facilitated arms dealing between France and Middle East countries, including Saudi Arabia, Pakistan, Syria, and Libya. He was sentenced to a five-year prison sentence by the French Court of Justice of the Republic in June 2020 for using some of those funds to finance the unsuccessful presidential campaign of former French Prime Minister Edouard Balladur in the context of the Karachi affair.

He facilitated the release of Bulgarian nurses from Libya and organized Libya President Muammar Gaddafi's 2007 visit to France. He later accused former French President Nicolas Sarkozy of taking €50 million from Gaddafi from 2006 to 2007 to finance his presidential campaign, a claim echoed by Saif al-Islam Gaddafi.

On 4 December 2020, he was detained in Lebanon due to allegations of covert financing to Sarkozy's presidential campaign. On 8 December, Lebanon ordered his release, but also imposed a travel ban on him.

On 27 March 2025, as part of the trial over the Libyan financing allegations, the National Financial Prosecutor (Parquet national financier) requested a six-year prison sentence and a €3 million fine for Takieddine, accused of handing €5 million to Claude Guéant between 2006 and 2007. As he still resided in Lebanon and that country never extradites its citizens, Takieddine was scheduled to be tried in absentia. The judgment by the Tribunal de Paris, on 25 September, did not deliver a verdict for Takieddine, who had died two days earlier.

== Personal life and death ==
His ex-wife, Nicola Johnson, is British-born. She has accused him of tax evasion in France. Takieddine owned Warwick House in London's Holland Park district via a company in the tax haven of the British Virgin Islands. It was sold to neighbour Brian May for £12 million following the divorce settlement. In 2013 Takieddine was denied entry to the United Kingdom following an "allegation of fraud" and was forced by British police to return to France. Takieddine was the first cousin, once removed of lawyer and activist Amal Clooney, as the first cousin of Clooney's father.

Takieddine died in Beirut on 23 September 2025, at the age of 75.
