= Bettencourt affair =

2010 French political scandal

The Bettencourt affair involves allegations of illegal payments made by billionaire heiress Liliane Bettencourt to François-Marie Banier and members of the French government associated with Nicolas Sarkozy in 2010.

== History ==
In June 2010, Ms. Bettencourt became embroiled in a high-level French political scandal after other details of the tape recordings made by her butler became public. The tapes allegedly picked up conversations between Bettencourt and her financial adviser, Patrice de Maistre, which indicate that Bettencourt may have avoided paying taxes by keeping a substantial amount of cash in undeclared Swiss bank accounts. The tapes also allegedly captured a conversation between Bettencourt and Éric Woerth (then Minister of Labour), who was soliciting a job for his wife managing Bettencourt's wealth, while he was acting as budget minister and running a high-profile campaign to catch wealthy tax evaders. Moreover, Ms Bettencourt received a €30 million tax rebate while Mr Woerth was budget minister.

In July 2010, the scandal appeared to widen after Bettencourt's former accountant, Claire Thibout, alleged in an interview with the French investigative web-site Mediapart, that conservative French politicians were frequently given envelopes stuffed with cash at the Bettencourt's mansion in Neuilly-sur-Seine. She alleged that Mr Woerth, while acting as treasurer for the Union for a Popular Movement (UMP), was given an envelope containing €150,000 in cash in March 2007 towards the presidential campaign of Nicolas Sarkozy. Following these allegations, French police raided the home and office of Mr de Maistre, who heads Clymène, the company owned by Ms Bettencourt to manage her wealth. Political donations are limited to €7,500 for political parties and €4,600 for individuals. Contributions above €150 must be paid by cheque with the donor clearly identified.

In October 2010, a burglary took place targeting the offices of three newspapers: Le Monde, Le Point, and Mediapart. The incident involved the theft of laptops belonging to Hervé Gattegno (Le Point) and Gérard Davet (Le Monde), who were handling the Woerth-Bettencourt affair. The laptops were taken from the headquarters of Le Point and from Davet's home. Additionally, Mediapart reported the disappearance of CDs containing the illegal wiretaps of Liliane Bettencourt. Le Monde previously filed a complaint on September 20, 2010, citing the breach of source confidentiality. The responsible party behind this burglary remains officially unknown.

In 2013, the former French president Nicolas Sarkozy, a former minister, Éric Woerth, a prosecutor, Philippe Courroye and the former director of the DCRI, Bernard Squarcini, were targeted by a procedure of indictment in diverse points of the affair.

On October 7, 2013, French authorities removed Sarkozy from the list of names to be charged in the case.

== Banier ==
In 2015 François-Marie Banier was convicted of 'abuse of weakness' of Liliane Bettencourt, prosecutor Gérard Aldigé stating he had "imposed his control over her like a spider spinning its web. And once he had her in his net, he never let her go. She became his thing. He dealt with her like a vampire." Banier was sentenced to two and a half years prison, and ordered to pay €158 million in damages to Liliane Bettencourt. Seven other defendants, including Liliane Bettencourt's financial advisor, lawyer, and notary, were also convicted and given lesser sentences. Banier appealed. The second trial, which concluded in May 2016, upheld the conviction, but suspended the prison sentence and canceled the damages.

== See also ==
- Alleged Libyan interference in the 2007 French elections
