= Claude Guéant =

French civil servant and politician (born 1945)

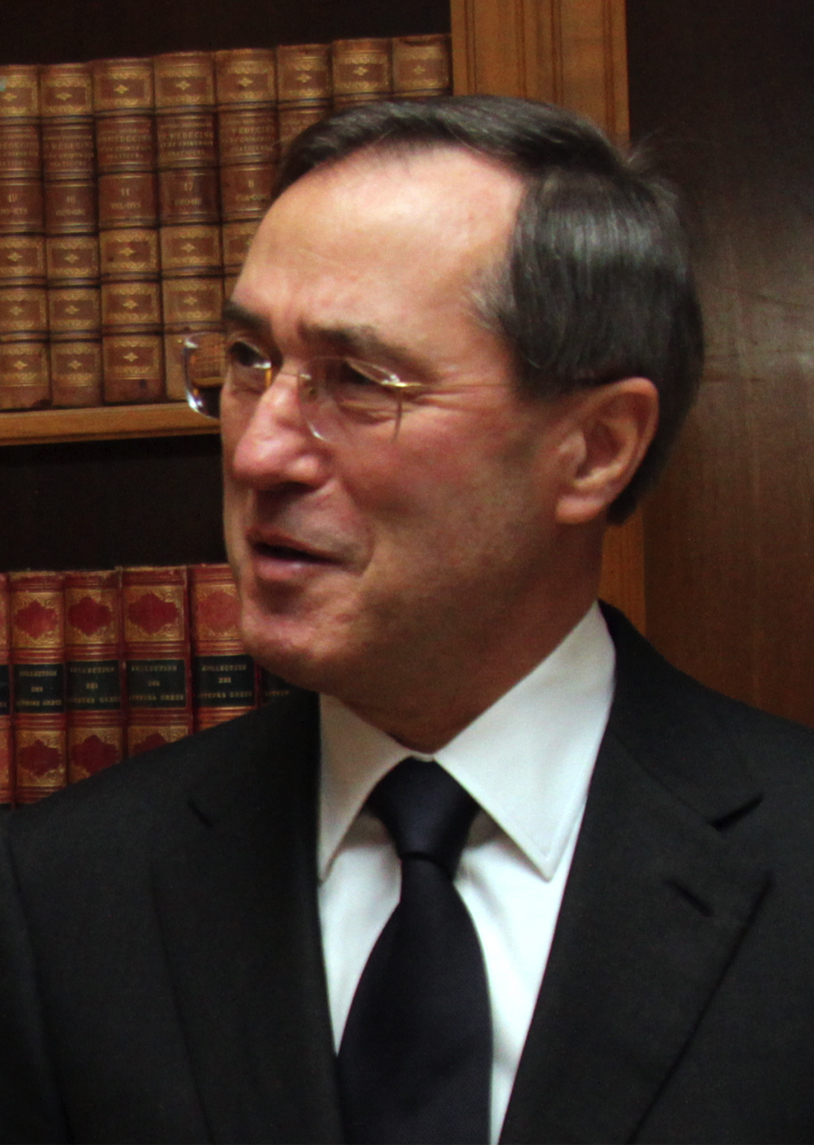
- Guéant in 2011

Minister of the Interior
- In office 27 February 2011 – 16 May 2012
- Prime Minister: François Fillon
- Preceded by: Brice Hortefeux
- Succeeded by: Manuel Valls

Secretary-General to the President of France
- In office 16 May 2007 – 27 February 2011
- President: Nicolas Sarkozy
- Preceded by: Frédéric Salat-Baroux
- Succeeded by: Xavier Musca

Personal details
- Born: Claude Henri Guéant; 17 January 1945 (age 81) Vimy, France
- Party: Union for a Popular Movement (until 2015); The Republicans (since 2015)
- Education: Sciences Po; École nationale d'administration
- Occupation: Civil servant

Claude Henri Guéant (French pronunciation: [klod ɡeɑ̃]; born 17 January 1945) is a French former civil servant and politician of the now-former conservative Union for a Popular Movement (UMP). Appointed secretary-general to President Nicolas Sarkozy on 16 May 2007, he served as Minister of the Interior from 27 February 2011 until 16 May 2012.

== Early life and education ==
Guéant was born in Vimy. He studied law in Paris at a university. He then entered Sciences Po and then the ENA administration school (Thomas More promotion of 1971).

== Career ==
After graduating from the ENA, Guéant became chief of staff of the prefect of the Finistère department, and then, in 1974, general secretary of Guadeloupe for economic affairs. In 1977, he entered the Ministry of Interior as a technical counsellor of Christian Bonnet, an office which he held until François Mitterrand's election in 1981.

Nominated sub-prefect (sous-préfet hors-classe), Guéant then worked alongside the prefect of the region Centre. Guéant then became general secretary of the prefecture of the Hérault department and then of the Hauts-de-Seine. In 1991, he was nominated prefect of the Hautes-Alpes department.

During the second cohabitation (Édouard Balladur's government), Guéant was named deputy-director of Charles Pasqua's cabinet, who was at the time the Minister of Interior. In 1994, he was named general director of the national police.

Under Jacques Chirac's presidency, Guéant was named in 1998 prefect of the Franche-Comté region and of the Doubs department, before being named prefect of the Brittany region and of the Ille-et-Vilaine department in 2000.

Guéant has been closely associated with Nicolas Sarkozy since at least 2002. From 2002 he was Sarkozy's chief of staff (directeur de cabinet), following him to the Ministry of Finance in 2004, then to the Ministry of the Interior from June 2005 to March 2007. During the 2007 presidential campaign, he was in charge of Sarkozy's campaign. and was named general secretary of the Elysée on 16 May 2007. He was particularly listened to by Sarkozy, and his power has given him many surnames such as the "Cardinal", "Prime Minister bis", or "Vice President".

=== Minister of the Interior, 2011–2012 ===
On 27 February 2011, Guéant was nominated Secretary of the Interior (Ministère de l'Intérieur). Though Alain Juppé has explicitly denied it, many have claimed that Guéant's departure from the post of general secretary was a sine qua non for Juppé to accept the Minister of Foreign Affairs position the same day, due to Guéant's meddling in foreign policy since his appointment in 2007.

During his time as minister, Guéant and his Italian counterpart Roberto Maroni agreed in April 2011 on the two countries working together to patrol the coasts and enforce an accord between Italy and Tunisia on the return of migrants. Also in 2011, he oversaw police raids in Paris and in two of its heavily immigrant suburbs which resulted in the arrest of suspected terrorists who were planning to go to Pakistan to train with Islamic militants. In 2012, he notably ordered the dissolution of a domestic Islamist group, Forsane Alizza or “The Knights of Pride,” saying that it was a terrorist organization training its members “for armed combat.”

== Life after politics ==
In 2015, Guéant was given a two-year suspended prison sentence, barred from public office for five years, and fined €75,000 for taking €210,000 over two years from a cash fund intended for police investigations and using it to award bonuses to himself and his staff. In 2019 a French court rejected his appeal, sentencing him to one year in prison.

Guéant has been the target of two investigative judge cases, including one where Sarkozy's 2007 campaign allegedly received donations from the government of Libya, under the reign of Muammar Gaddafi.

In October 2021, the Judicial Tribunal of Nanterre announced that Guéant would be tried for "illicit financing" of his legislative campaign of 2012, because of the distribution of a leaflet in his favor by the LR mayor of Boulogne-Billancourt (Hauts-de-Seine). On 21 January 2022, Guéant and three co-defendants, writer and one-time Sarkozy advisor Patrick Buisson, former cabinet director Emmanuelle Mignon and former pollster and consultant Pierre Giacometti, were found guilty of polling fraud involving allegations that they misused public money while ordering public opinion polls worth a combined 7.5 million euros ($8.7 million) during the course of Sarkozy's presidency between 2007 and 2012 and was sentenced to eight months in jail. He would be released on parole on 9 February after it was determined that he repaid the French treasury 292,000 euros in damages.

In 2025, Guéant was accused of taking a €500,000 bribe from Gaddafi and trying to cover it up with the sale of two small Flemish seascapes.

== Personal life ==
Guéant is a fan of American literature, and spent time in Minnesota in his younger days.

Political offices
Preceded by Brice Hortefeux	Minister of the Interior; 2011–2012	Succeeded by Manuel Valls
