= Libyan financing in the 2007 French presidential election =

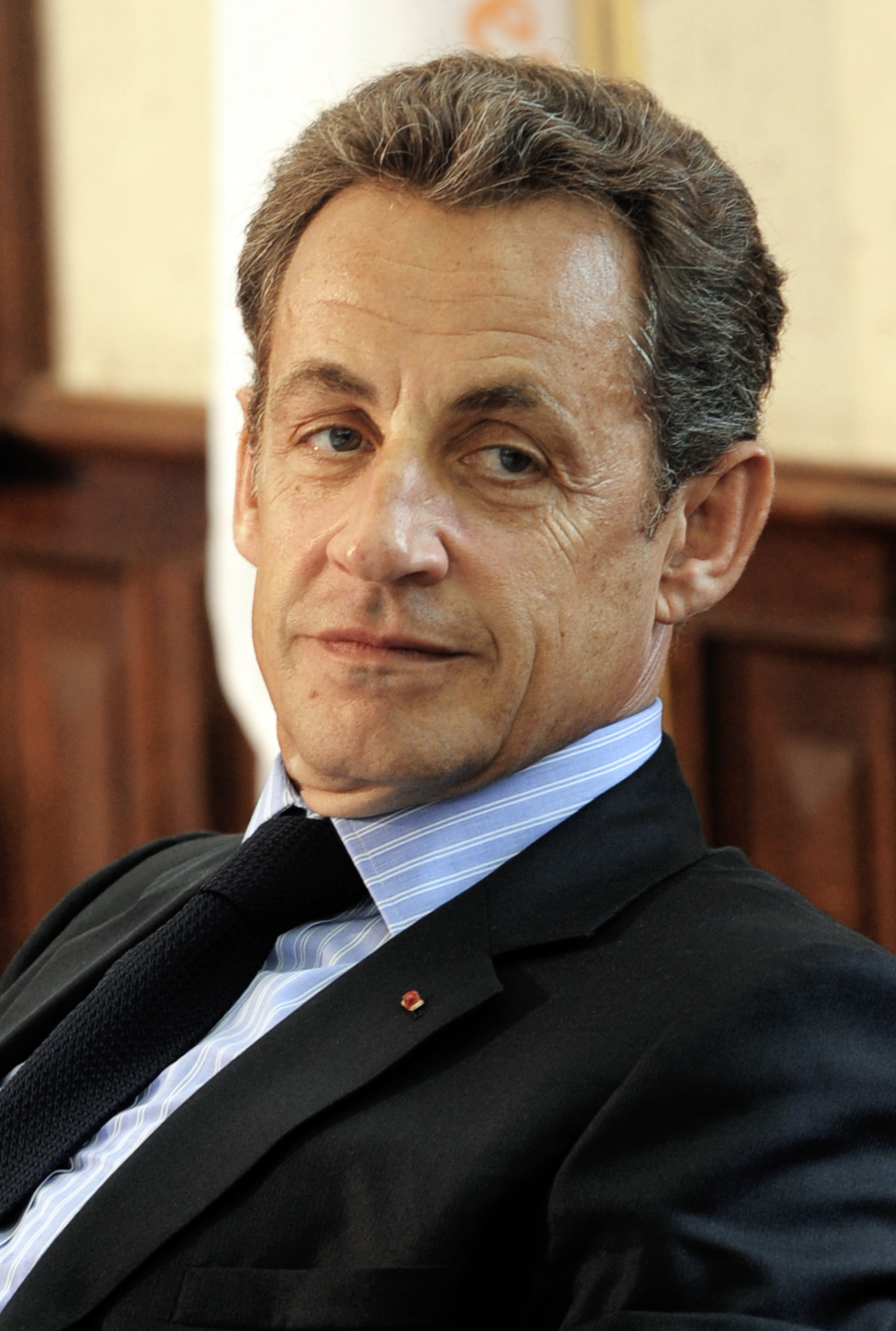
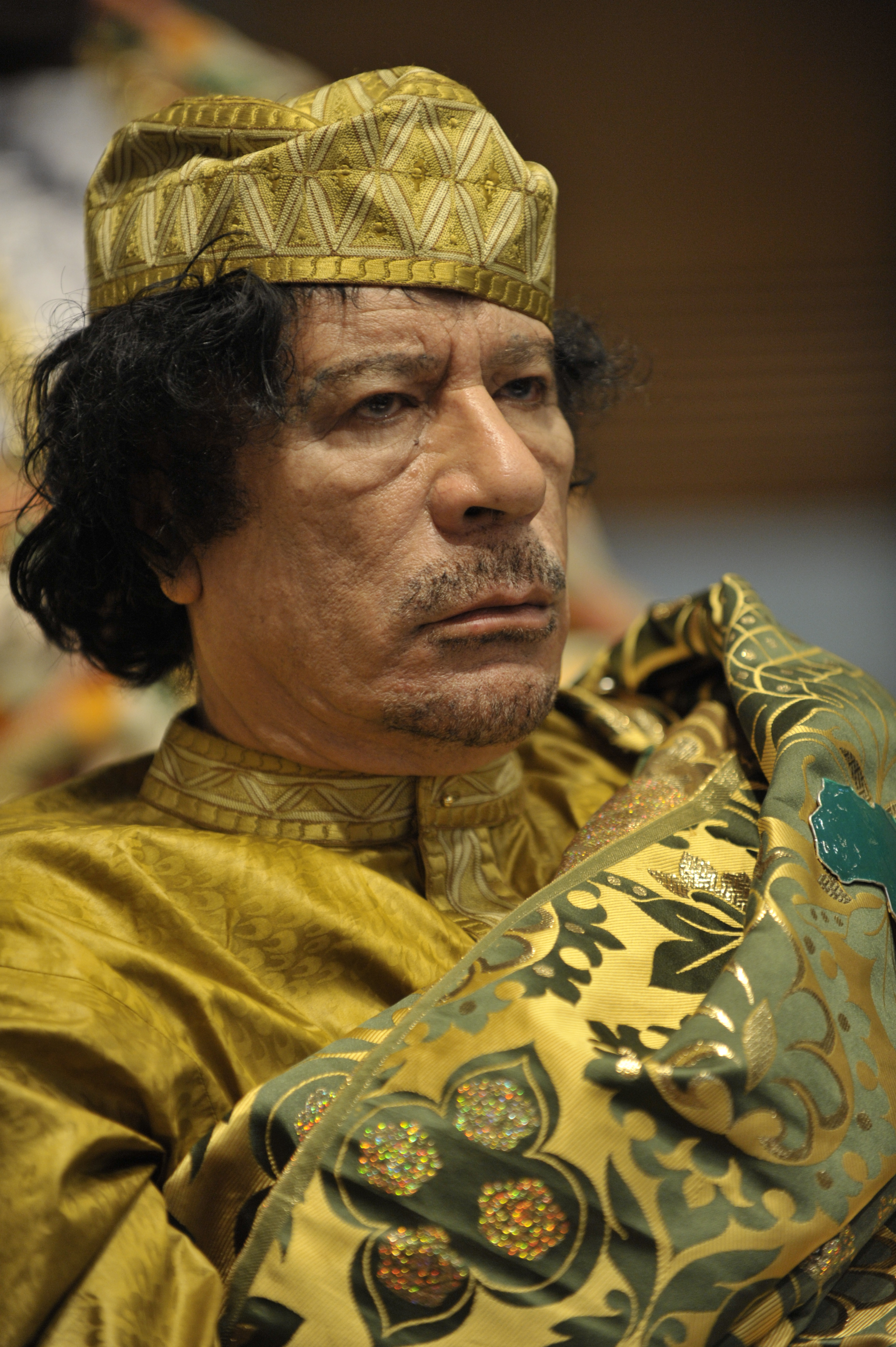
Nicolas Sarkozy's (left) 2007 presidential campaign received, through intermediaries, up to €50 million from Libya's Muammar Gaddafi (right).

Libya, at the direction of its then-leader Muammar Gaddafi, spent up to €50 million funding the 2007 presidential campaign of French politician Nicolas Sarkozy. The allegations surfaced in March 2011 from Saif al-Islam Gaddafi, son of Muammar Gaddafi, after France intervened in the Libyan civil war. This claim was subsequently supported by former Libyan prime minister Baghdadi Mahmudi and the investigative website Mediapart, which published documents and testimony that suggested large cash transfers. Other evidence included diaries belonging to former Libyan oil minister Shukri Ghanem, who was later found dead.

The French Central Directorate of the Judicial Police (DCPJ) opened an official inquiry in 2013 which led to arrests and charges against several individuals close to Sarkozy, including his former chief of staff, Claude Guéant, and French-Algerian businessman Alexandre Djouhri. The probe culminated in Sarkozy's own arrest and indictment in March 2018.

Whilst investigating these allegations, a separate wiretapping operation revealed linked corruption, leading to Sarkozy's conviction in 2021 for corruption and influence peddling, though the Libyan case proceeded separately. The Tribunal de Paris ultimately sentenced Sarkozy to five years in prison for criminal association in the Libyan financing case on September 25, 2025, making him the first former French president sentenced to prison.

== Background ==
=== 2007 election ===
Nicolas Sarkozy defeated Ségolène Royal to become President of France in the 2007 election. During the election, candidates were limited to spending no more than €21 million, and no single person could donate in excess of €7500 to a candidate. In addition, the sources of donations had to be publicly declared and contributions from foreign nationals were prohibited. Sarkozy officially spent €21 million on his campaign. The low size of the campaign spend relative to those in United States elections later prompted French scholar Sophie Meunier to declare that "French politicians are, therefore, not enslaved to special interests or Super PACs as they are in the U.S." Sarkozy served a five-year term as president, until he was narrowly defeated in the 2012 election.

=== Libyan détente and later reversal ===
In December 2007, following Sarkozy's inauguration, Libyan leader Muammar Gaddafi visited the country on Sarkozy's invitation, over the objections of both the political opposition and members of Sarkozy's government. Gaddafi's visit to France was his first in over 35 years; during the trip, France agreed to sell Libya 21 Airbus aircraft and the two countries signed a nuclear cooperation agreement. Negotiations for the sale of over a dozen French Dassault Rafale fighter jets, as well as military helicopters, were also initiated during Gaddafi's visit.

In 2011, France, under Sarkozy, voted for international military intervention in the Libyan Civil War against the Gaddafi government in United Nations Security Council Resolution 1973. France then attacked Libyan government forces in support of the National Transitional Council in Opération Harmattan.

== Allegations and investigation ==
=== Allegations ===
In March 2011, the same month French forces began their intervention in Libya, Saif al-Islam Gaddafi, a son of Muammar Gaddafi, gave an interview to Euronews in which he claimed that the Libyan state had donated €50 million to Sarkozy's 2007 presidential campaign in exchange for access and favours. He was quoted as saying: "We funded it and we have all the details and are ready to reveal everything. The first thing we want this clown to do is to give the money back to the Libyan people. He was given assistance so that he could help them. But he's disappointed us: give us back our money." Sarkozy rejected the claim by Gaddafi.

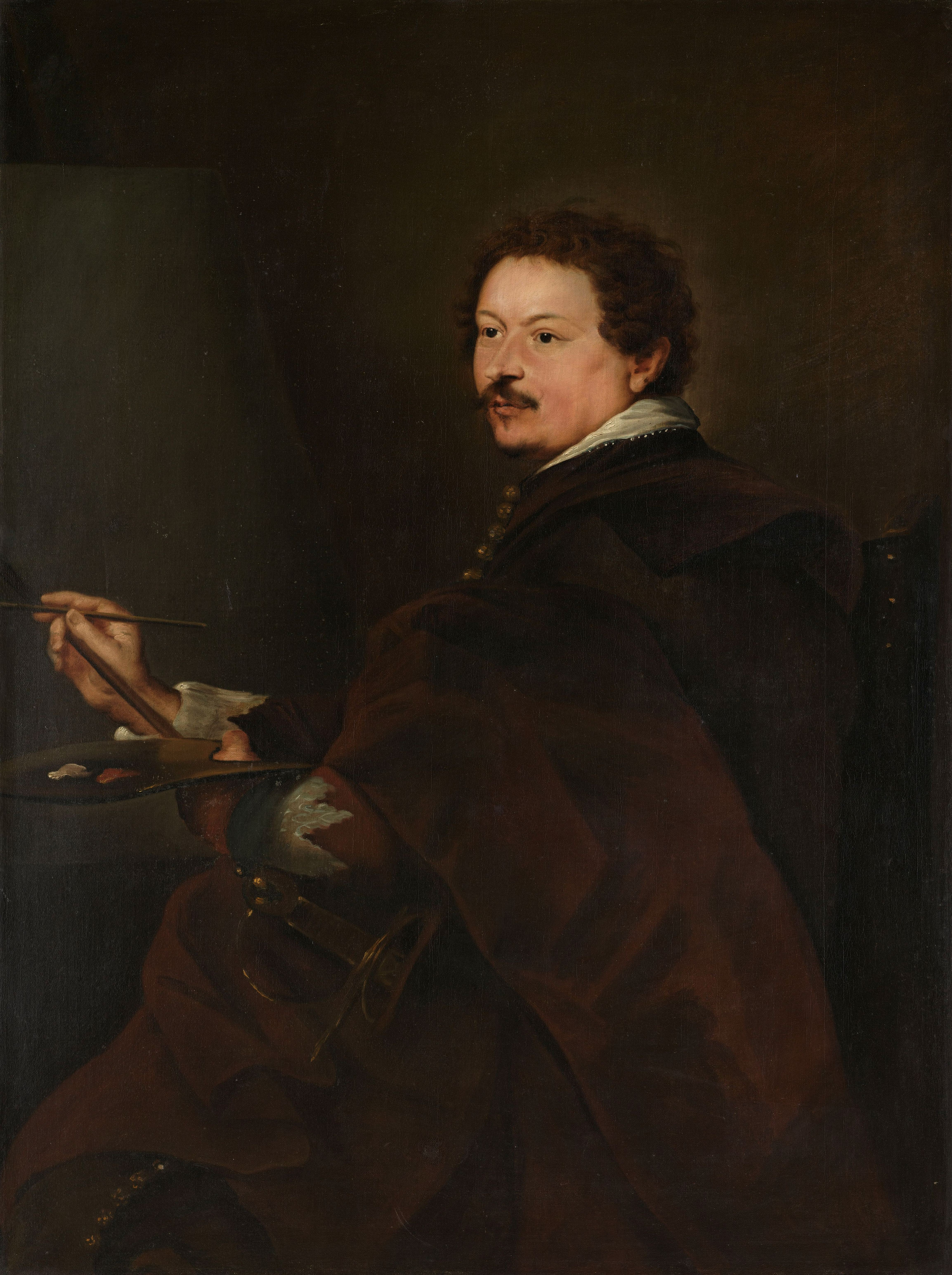
The sale of two Andries van Eertvelt (pictured) paintings by Claude Guéant has become a central question in the investigation.

The following October, the claim that Libya had funded Sarkozy's 2007 election campaign was repeated by former Libyan prime minister Baghdadi Mahmudi. Investigative website Mediapart subsequently published several documents appearing to prove payment of €50 million and also published a claim by Ziad Takieddine that he had personally handed three briefcases full of cash to Sarkozy. French magistrates later acquired the diaries of former Libyan oil minister Shukri Ghanem in which payments to Sarkozy were mentioned. Shortly thereafter, however, Ghanem was found dead, floating in the Danube in Austria and thereby preventing his corroboration of the diaries.

In 2014, television station France 3 released an audio recording made by Delphine Minoui on March 16, 2011, during which Minoui interviewed Muammar Gaddafi. In the recording, Gaddafi told Minoui that Sarkozy had approached him seeking funds for his presidential election campaign while still serving as French interior minister.

In February 2018, the Asharq Al-Awsat newspaper quoted a source alleging that Sarkozy had promised Libyan representatives improved relations between France and Libya should he be elected president and that he would wrap up the matter of the bombing of UTA Flight 772. (In 1999, Abdullah Senussi had been sentenced in absentia by a French court to life imprisonment for the 1989 bombing of UTA Flight 772. Among other things, Gaddafi in 2005 asked Sarkozy for the lifting of the international arrest warrant issued by France against Senussi.)

Saif al-Islam reiterated his 2011 claim in 2018 and 2025, and since also added that a former officer of the Libyan intelligence service was at that time in possession of a recording of a meeting between Muammar Gaddafi and Sarkozy that occurred in Tripoli in 2007, during which payments were discussed.[17][18]

=== Investigation ===
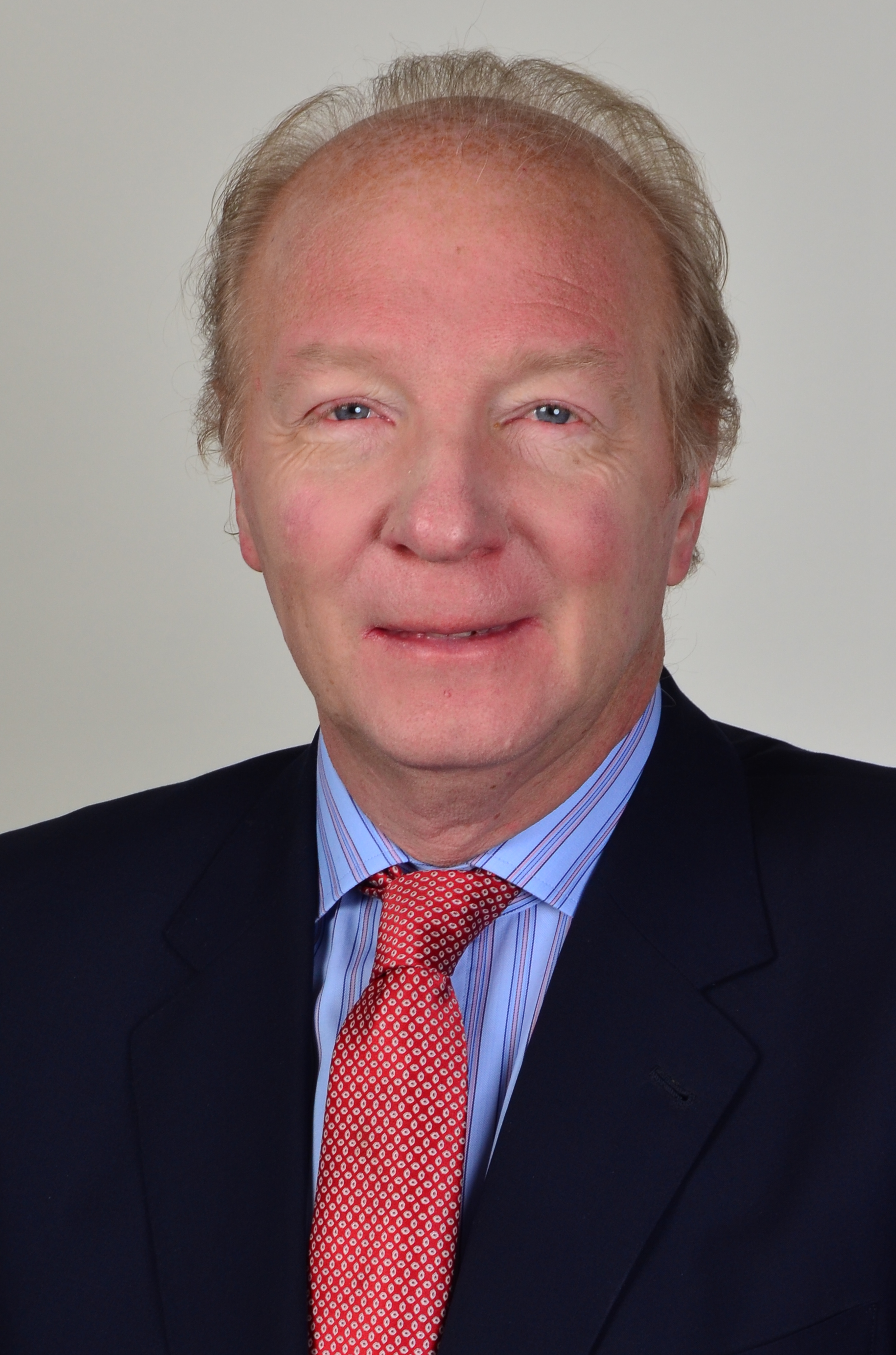
Brice Hortefeux in 2014

In 2013 the Central Directorate of the Judicial Police (DCPJ) officially opened an investigation into the allegations of Libyan funding of Sarkozy's 2007 election campaign. In March 2018, Sarkozy-era interior minister Brice Hortefeux voluntarily appeared before French police for questioning. Several arrests were made in relation to the inquiry.

==== Arrests and charges ====
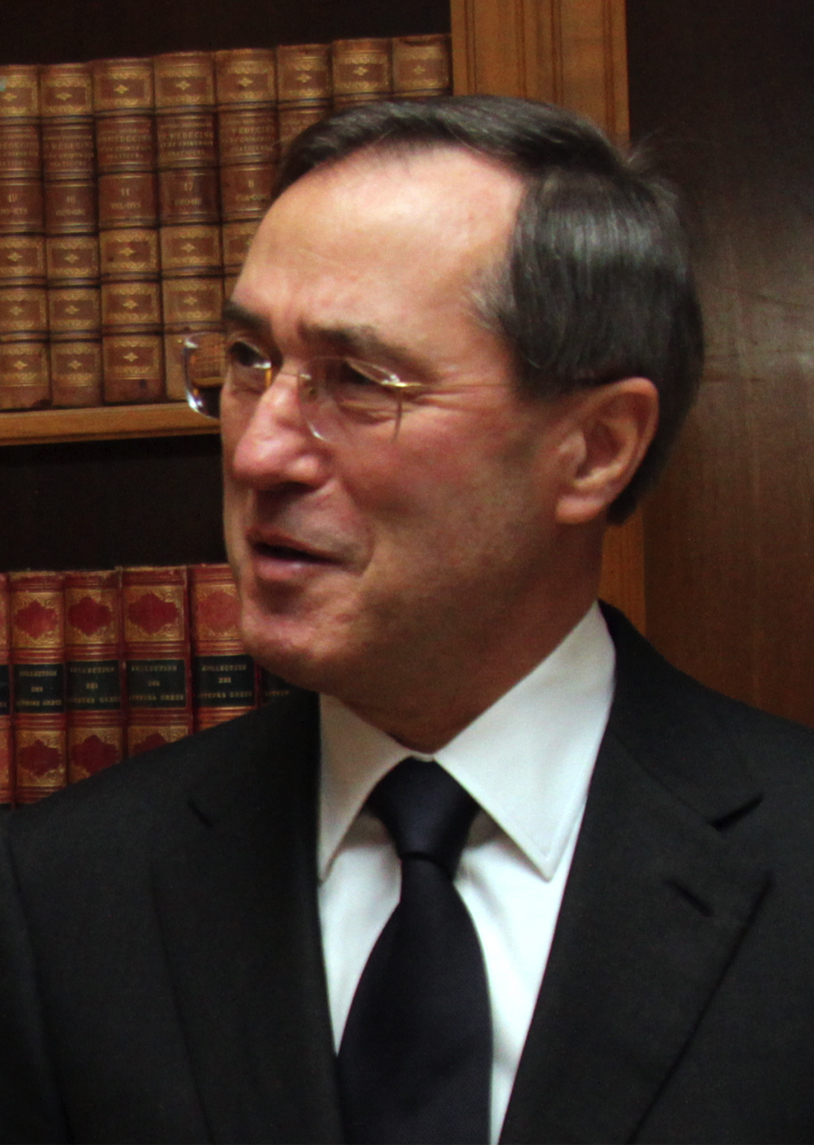
Claude Guéant was charged in 2015 with money laundering and forgery.

On March 6, 2015, Claude Guéant, the former chief of staff to Sarkozy, was arrested. He was charged with money laundering and forgery. Investigators allege that Guéant was instrumental in facilitating the transfer of funds from Libya and may have personally received US$500,000. Guéant has denied these allegations, claiming the money was payment for two Andries van Eertvelt paintings he sold to a Malaysian attorney. He maintains the sale was arranged by Saudi businessman, Khalid Ali Bugshan.

On the same day as Guéant's arrest, Khalid Ali Bugshan was also taken into police custody for questioning, though he was not charged. Later that month, on March 30, 2015, Claude Guéant's son, François Guéant, was also brought in for questioning in a matter separate from the paintings sale. The investigation later expanded to include French-Algerian businessman Alexandre Djouhri. On January 9, 2018, Djouhri was arrested by British police at Heathrow Airport based on a European Arrest Warrant; the warrant was issued after he failed to appear for questioning in Paris. Djouhri was eventually released on $1.4 million bail, and was ultimately returned to France and placed in pre-trial detention ahead of a March 28 hearing. The inquiry culminated in the arrest of Sarkozy on March 20. He was detained for questioning at the DCPJ station in Nanterre. He was charged with corruption the following day.

== Trial ==
The investigation led to a separate corruption case concerning wiretapped conversations between Nicolas Sarkozy and his lawyer, Thierry Herzog. Sarkozy was convicted of corruption charges on March 1, 2021. This conviction was subsequently upheld by the Paris Court of Appeals in May 2023, confirming a sentence of three years in jail; two suspended and one to be served as house arrest with an electronic tag. Sarkozy stated his intent to appeal this verdict to the Court of Cassation, France's highest court.

Sarkozy was indicted in October 2023, on charges including "concealment of witness tampering" and "participation in a criminal association with a view to committing the offense of fraud in judgment in an organized gang," specifically related to the retraction of witness Ziad Takieddine. Nicolas Sarkozy's wife, Carla Bruni-Sarkozy, was placed on bail after being accused of pressuring a witness in the illegal campaign financing case in July 2024.

The main trial concerning the Libyan financing allegations concluded with sentencing requests from the Financial Prosecutor's Office on March 27, 2025. The prosecution sought a seven-year prison sentence, a €300,000 fine, and a five-year ban from elections for Sarkozy. It also requested prison sentences for his associates: six years for Claude Guéant and three years for Brice Hortefeux. The Tribunal de Paris delivered its final judgment on September 25, 2025, sentencing Sarkozy to five years in prison for criminal association, making him the first former French president to receive a prison sentence. His former advisor, Claude Guéant, was sentenced to six years (convertible due to health issues), and his former interior minister, Brice Hortefeux, received a two-year sentence.

Sarkozy's sentence being assorted to a provisional execution (without waiting for an appeal), the former president entered the prison de la santé on October 21.

== Reaction ==
=== Arrest ===
Nicolas Sarkozy's political party, The Republicans (LR), issued a statement following his arrest in which it said the former president had the party's full support. Spokesman Christian Jacob later suggested that the accusations against Sarkozy were politically motivated. Following Sarkozy's arrest, Éric Ciotti expressed confidence the former president would be exonerated.

=== Sentencing ===
Following Sarkozy's sentencing, figures from LR rallied in his support, with senator Stéphane Le Rudulier calling the ruling "a tsunami of shame" and urged for a presidential pardon. Far-right National Rally leader Marine Le Pen, herself convicted of embezzlement, criticized the judicial process, stating that the use of provisional execution (without waiting for an appeal) "represents a great danger in terms of the fundamental principles of our law."

Left-wing and green politicians welcomed the sentence. Socialist Party spokesperson Chloé Ridel commented "A former president of the Republic is a citizen before the law like anyone else – and this one is going to prison." La France Insoumise politician Clémentine Autain wrote on Twitter (X) "Head held high, dirty hands. The rule of law did not fail." The Ecologists leader Marine Tondelier sarcastically remarked "Thank you to Nicolas Sarkozy and to Les Républicains for always setting an example."

== See also ==
- Bettencourt affair
- France–Libya relations
- London School of Economics Gaddafi links
