= Doha GOALS =

Sports initiative

Doha GOALS—Gathering of All Leaders In Sport—is an initiative designed as a "call to action" for the role that sport plays as a driver for social and economic change. The initiative, from the Aspire Zone Foundation and Richard Attias & Associates, will build a community of global influencers from all industries who believe that sport is a crucial vehicle for social and economic development. Doha Goals Forum is already a well-known manifestation, where many projects can be evoked. For example, during the third edition, in November 2014, Hassan Al Thawadi repeated that Qatar "can organize the World Cup in summer".

The executive director of Doha GOALS is H. E. Sheikh Faisal bin Mubarak Al Thani. The initiative is produced by Richard Attias & Associates.

== Launch at London Olympic Games 2012 ==
The launch of Doha GOALS at Bayt Qatar during the London 2012 games was attended by President Ali Bongo Ondimba of Gabon and Olympic athletes including Carl Lewis, Tegla Loroupe, Marie-José Pérec and Ian Thorpe. Richard Attias, the former producer of the World Economic Forum in Davos, and the Clinton Global Initiative, will produce Doha GOALS in 2012.

== Pre-Forum ==
The Doha GOALS Forum will be based on initiatives that were discussed during a pre-forum session on January 8, 2012, hosted by the Aspire Zone Foundation at the Torch Hotel in Doha, Qatar. H. E. Sheikh Saoud Bin Abdulrahman Al-Thani, Secretary General of Qatar Olympic Committee, and Hassan Al-Thawadi, Secretary General of the Supreme Committee for Qatar 2022, led the session alongside Hilal Jeham Al Kuwari, President of Aspire Zone Foundation. In attendance were also global figures such as Martina Navratilova and Arianna Huffington.

At the session, H. E. Sheikh Saoud Bin Abdulrahman Al-Thani delivered an address outlining the vision of Doha GOALS. He said that the forum would pioneer "social change" through values of "sportsmanship and the ethics of sport".

== Leadership ==
Doha GOALS was created under the patronage of H. E. Sheikh Hamad bin Khalifa Al-Thani. Sheikh Hamad bin Khalifa Al-Thani became the new Emir of the State of Qatar on June 26, 1995, continuing the rule of the Al-Thani family that began nearly two centuries ago.

H. E. Sheikh Faisal bin Mubarak Al Thani is the executive director of Doha Goals. He graduated with a degree in political science from American University, Washington, D.C., and was the president of Al Arabi Sports Club 2006–2008. H. E. Sheikh Saoud Bin Abdulrahman Al-Thani is the Secretary General of the Qatar Olympic Committee and the vice-president of the International Fencing Federation. He graduated with a degree in Electrical Engineering from the New Mexico State University and a master's degree in Sports Management at University of Lyon. He is the president of the Qatar Fencing Federation and served as Director-General of 17th Arabian Gulf Cup.

Richard Attias is a global influencer and events producer, founder and former chairman of PublicisLive and presently the executive chairman of Richard Attias and Associates, and the producer of Doha Goals. He has organized gatherings of global leaders in the last 20 years including the World Economic Forum in Davos; the Clinton Global Initiative; the Middle East Peace Summit in Jordan; the Dalian Economic Summit in China; and the signature of the General Agreement on Tariffs and Trade (GATT) in Marrakesh, and most recently the Asia-Pacific Economic Cooperation (APEC) Summit in Hawaii in November 2011.

== Global Watch ==
In June 2014 in Doha, Doha GOALS founded and launched Global Watch: Say No To Racism-Discrimination In Sport, a new global initiative to tackle discrimination in sport with South African activist and politician Tokyo Sexwale and the Nelson Mandela Foundation.

Commenting on this partnership, Sheikh Faisal bin Mubarak al Thani, executive director of the Doha GOALS and co-chair of Global Watch, said: "Doha GOALS forum is proud to be a founding partner of Global Watch, we believe that sport can play a critical role in contributing to the building of a better world, and look forward to working with the Nelson Mandela foundation and the Sexwale foundation on advancing this mission."

Global Watch will undertake a global summit in Johannesburg, South Africa, from the 9th to the 11th of September 2014, and the drafting of national codes of conduct governing the conduct and behaviour of sporting persons in respect of anti-racism-discrimination towards non-racialism on playing fields.

This new initiative has been welcomed by FIFA, the International Olympic Committee and the UN Human Rights Commission, as well as high-profile leaders such as African Union Commission chairperson Nkosazana Dlamini-Zuma, Anglican Archbishop Emeritus Desmond Tutu, former UN secretary-general Kofi Annan, former US vice-president Al Gore, and former South African presidents Thabo Mbeki and FW de Klerk.

== Production ==
=== Aspire Zone Foundation ===
Established in 2003, Aspire Zone Foundation is an international sports project which includes Aspire academy, Aspetar and Aspire Logistics. All these corporate entities were unified by Emiri decree in 2008. Located in Doha, Aspire Zone Foundation was voted the world's leading Sports Tourism Development Project for the World Travel Awards 2011.

=== Richard Attias and Associates ===
Richard Attias & Associates is a strategic communications firm that provides private consultancy and idea initiatives. Some of the work that RAA has created or produced in the last year includes: New York Forum and New York Forum AFRICA; APEC CEO Summit in Hawaii; The New York Times Schools for Tomorrow, Energy for Tomorrow and Opportunities for Tomorrow conferences; Global Food Security Forum in Morocco; Global Competitiveness Forum in Saudi Arabia; Qatar–U.S. Business Forum in New York; Conference of Nobel Laureates; and African Securities Exchange Association Summit.
