= Cécilia Attias =

Spouse of the President of France in 2007

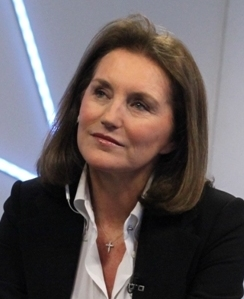
- Cécilia Attias in 2014

Spouse of the President of France
- In role 16 May 2007 – 15 October 2007
- President: Nicolas Sarkozy
- Preceded by: Bernadette Chirac
- Succeeded by: Carla Bruni-Sarkozy (2008)

Personal details
- Born: Cécile Ciganer; 12 November 1957 (age 69) Boulogne-Billancourt, France
- Spouse(s): Jacques Martin (m. 1984; div. 1989) Nicolas Sarkozy (m. 1996; div. 2007) Richard Attias (m. 2008)
- Children: 3
- Known for: Marriage to the French President

Cécilia María Sara Isabel Attias (legally named Cécilia María Sara Isabel Ciganer-Albéniz, née Cécile Ciganer; born 12 November 1957) is a French political advisor and activist who was the spouse of the president of France for a brief period in 2007 as wife of Nicolas Sarkozy.

== Background ==
Cecilia Attias was born Cécilia María Sara Isabel Ciganer-Albéniz. Her father, André (Aron) Ciganer, was a Moldovan immigrant born in Bălți, Bessarabia in 1898 of Russian-Jewish lineage. He left home at the age of 13, just before the First World War. Ciganer moved to Paris, where he became a furrier. In 1937, he converted to Catholicism and married Spanish-Belgian Diane Albéniz de Swert, a daughter of Alfonso Albéniz Jordana, a Spanish diplomat who played with Real Madrid and FC Barcelona in the early 1900s. and a Belgian mother. Her maternal great-grandfather was the Spanish composer Isaac Albéniz.

Cécilia Sarkozy Attias has three older brothers:

- Patrick Ciganer-Albeniz is a program executive officer of the Integrative Financial Management Program of NASA.
- Christian Ciganer-Albéniz is a consultant for companies such as Framatome, AXA, Lagardère, Crédit Foncier, Accor, and Aurel Conseil.
- Ivan Antoine Ciganer-Albéniz

Her mother's half-brothers and half-sisters, as well as their descendants, belong to a family of Antwerp nobility: the Le Grelle family. Her maternal grandmother, Rosalie de Sweert (1901–1982), married Count Adelin Le Grelle in 1921 in Valencia, Spain. From this union two children were born, Count Richard Le Grelle (1921) and Countess Marie-Antoinette, who had four children with the Canadian ambassador Keith MacLellan.

She studied piano (first prize in piano at Conservatoire), and obtained a baccalauréat B, after studying for 13 years in a French religious institution, Sœurs de Lübeck. She enrolled at Panthéon-Assas University for law studies but abandoned them and went on to become a parliamentary assistant to René Touzet. She worked as a fashion model, beginning her career as an assistant to Jean-Daniel Lorieux. She worked as a fitting model for Schiaparelli and a public-relations company.

== Political life ==
When her husband was a minister, Cécilia Sarkozy had an office next to his, serving as his close adviser. In 2002, she was appointed to the Office of the Ministry of the Interior. In 2005 she was appointed Chief-of-Staff for the UMP Party.

Cécilia Sarkozy visited Libya twice in July 2007 to meet Muammar al-Gaddafi and helped in securing the release of five Bulgarian nurses and one Palestinian doctor who had all spent years on Libya's death row after allegedly being tortured into confessing to deliberately infecting Libyan babies with HIV. The French left asked for Cécilia Sarkozy to be heard by the Parliamentary Commission expected to be created in October 2007 concerning the terms of the release of the six, as she had played an "important role" in their liberation according to Pierre Moscovici (PS). The release process is described in the book Notes from Hell from the perspective of one of the medics, Valya Cherveniashka.

== Personal life ==
Cécilia Ciganer-Albéniz moved in with the popular French TV host Jacques Martin in 1983. They married on 10 August 1984. The wedding took place in Neuilly-sur-Seine at the town hall, and Nicolas Sarkozy, then the mayor of Neuilly, conducted the wedding. The Martins had two daughters, Judith Martin (b. 22 August 1984) and Jeanne-Marie Martin (b. 8 June 1987). She has two grandsons, Augustin and Louis as well as a granddaughter Diane Élisabeth, born of her daughter Jeanne-Marie.

In 1987, Sarkozy, who was married to his first wife at the time, met Cécilia Martin again and has said he felt "struck by lightning". Other sources, however, state that Sarkozy fell in love with the bride on her wedding day. Cécilia Martin left her husband to live with Sarkozy in 1988 and obtained a divorce three months later. Once Sarkozy had himself obtained a divorce in 1996, they married in Neuilly on 23 October 1996. The witnesses were Martin Bouygues and billionaire businessman Bernard Arnault. Six months later, on 23 April 1997, Cécilia Sarkozy gave birth to the couple's only child, Louis. Nicolas Sarkozy had two sons from his first marriage.

Nicolas Sarkozy once declared that Cécilia Sarkozy was his "strength and [his] Achilles' heel". Nicolas Sarkozy wrote in his 2005 book, Testimony, "Today, Cécilia and I are reunited for good, for real, doubtless for ever ... [W]e are not able and do not know how to separate from each other." He has said his wife is his "true soulmate" and "the person without whom nothing I do would be possible". In July 2007, he said, "At the end of day, my only real worry is Cécilia."

Rumors had circulated since Sarkozy's election as president in May 2007 that the couple had separated, and further rumors surfaced in the French media in October 2007 that they were soon expected to announce their plans to divorce. On 18 October 2007 the Élysée Palace released a statement declaring that the Sarkozys "announce their separation by mutual consent". Shortly afterwards, the palace corrected the separation announcement by stating that the Sarkozys had actually officially divorced.

On 19 October 2007, an interview with Cécilia Sarkozy was published on the front page of L'Est Républicain, a regional French newspaper. In it, she admitted that she had run away with her lover, Richard Attias, in 2005 ("I met someone, I fell in love, I left") and that though she eventually returned to Sarkozy, they were unable to repair their marriage. "What happened to me has happened to millions of people: one day you no longer have your place in the couple. The couple is no longer the essential thing of your life. It no longer functions; it no longer works."

She married Attias, Executive Chairman of The Experience, an events management company, on 23 March 2008, at Rockefeller Center in New York.

== See also ==
- HIV trial in Libya

Unofficial roles
Preceded by Bernadette Chirac	Spouse of the President of France; 2007	Vacant Title next held by Carla Bruni-Sarkozy
