= Ashraf Ahmad =

Ashraf Ahmad may refer to:

- Ashraf Ghani (born 1949), Afghan politician and former president of Afghanistan, known as Ashraf Ahmad Zai during his high school years in Oregon, United States
- Ashraf Al Hajuj (born 1969), Palestinian-Bulgarian physician involved in the 1998 HIV trial in Libya
- Ahmed Ashraf (born 1992), Saudi Arabian footballer

== See also ==
- Ahmad (disambiguation)
- Ahmad (name)
- Ashraf (name)
