= New York Forum =

New York Forum may refer to:

- Austrian Cultural Forum New York, a network of Austrian Cultural Forums founded in New York
- 411 New York Forum, a community-driven site by on life in New York City and surrounding areas
- New York Times Youth Forum, a public affairs program that ended June 14, 1953
- The New York Forum, a meeting of business leaders at the Grand Hyatt Hotel, New York
