= Ashraf Al Hajuj =

Palestinian-Bulgarian medic (born 1969)

Ashraf Ahmad Al-Hajuj (also spelled Ashraf Jumaa El Hagoug or al-Hadzhudzh) (Bulgarian: Ашраф Ахмад ал-Хаджудж) (born 25 October 1969 in Alexandria, Egypt) is a Palestinian-Bulgarian medic who was the principal defendant in the HIV trial in Libya. Born in 1969, in 1972 he and his parents moved from Egypt to Libya, where his father was working as a senior teacher of mathematics. Al-Hajuj grew up and studied in Libya. He was in the last month of his internship when he was arrested and accused of infecting more than 400 children with HIV. The co-accused were five Bulgarian nurses (Kristiana Valcheva, Nasya Nenova, Valya Chervenyashka, Valentina Siropulo and Snezhana Dimitrova).

The first trial against them began in February 2000. They were accused of deliberately infecting the children with HIV, conspiracy and adultery. The nurses and Al-Hajuj had stated that their confessions were extracted under torture they were subjected to during their first year of detention.

In May 2004 they were sentenced to death by shooting. The defence team told the court that HIV was present in the hospital in Benghazi before the nurses began working there in 1998.

In December 2005, the Libyan court commuted the sentence and ordered a new trial. On December 19, 2006 the defendants were again sentenced to death.

On 11 July 2007, the Supreme Court of Libya confirmed the death sentences. Later the Supreme Court changed its verdict to life sentences. On 24 July 2007, after negotiation with the French president Nicolas Sarkozy, the Bulgarian nurses and Al-Hajuj (who received Bulgarian citizenship in June 2007 from the Bulgarian president Georgi Parvanov so they could be deported to Bulgaria), were released by Muammar Gaddafi according to the protocol of prisoners exchange. President Parvanov, convinced of their innocence, pardoned them by decree. Abdul-Rahman Shalqam, the Libyan foreign minister, said Parvanov had the right to pardon the medics.

After being released in 2007, Al-Hajuj attempted to settle down in Bulgaria and married a Bulgarian woman. They had a son named Rayan, born in Bulgaria. The marriage was brief and shortly afterwards Ashraf Al-Hajuj moved to the Netherlands, where his parents had found political asylum in 2005.

In 2010 he published, in the Netherlands, a book about his suffering in Libyan prison, named Khaddafi's scapegoat (Dutch: Khaddafi's zondebok).

After his release from the Libyan prison, Al-Hajuj announced his intention to sue Libya for his illegal detention, sadistic torture and inhumane conditions of confinement during his visit to the Netherlands where his family found political asylum in 2005. Since then, he actively participated in Human Rights campaigns, contributing to the protection and promotion of human rights, rule of law and justice for everyone. In April 2009 in Geneva, he confronted the Libyan chair of the UN Human Rights Council Najjat Al-Hajjaji during the UN Durban Review Conference. Later on Ashraf Al-Hajuj addressed the poor standards of human rights and freedom of expression in Libya, calling for justice for all at the time of the Geneva Summit for Human Rights and Democracy. In September 2010, he again participated in the campaign to remove Libya from the chair of the Human Rights Council launched by UN Watch. In Geneva he delivered his testimony on Gaddafi’s crimes in front of the UN Human Rights Council.

In March 2012 the Dutch court ruled in his favor in his lawsuit against twelve Libyan officials for torture and awarded him 1 million Euros for material and immaterial damages which are the result of inhumane treatment and torture. A few weeks after the decision of the Dutch court, the UN Human Rights Committee also ruled in favor of Doctor Al-Hajuj and found that Libya had violated his rights (Articles 7, 9 and 14 International Covenant on Civil and Political rights). According to the UN resolution, Libya ought to compensate Al-Hajuj for his incommunicado detention, inhumane treatment and torture and initiate criminal prosecution against those responsible for those violations.

In July 2012 in Varna, Bulgaria, Al-Hajuj married his Ukrainian girlfriend after a four-year relationship; they resided in the Netherlands.

== See also ==
- HIV trial in Libya
- Notes from Hell
