= Omar Bagasra =

Pakistani-American molecular biologist, biotechnologist and author

- Born: 1948 (age 77–78)
- Education: University of Karachi (B.Sc.); University of Karachi (M.Sc.); University of Louisville (Ph.D)
- Known for: In-Situ Polymerase Chain Reaction
- Scientific career
- Fields: Biotechnology; Genetics, Medicine
- Workplaces: Claflin University; University of South Carolina
- Doctoral advisor: John H. Wallace and John M Mansfield

Omar Bagasra (Urdu: عمر بگا سرا) is a Pakistani-American Molecular Biologist, Biotechnologist and author, known for his innovations in the Polymerase Chain Reaction method and popular public and scientific talks in biotechnology. He is also known for his role as an independent investigator in the HIV trial in Libya, an important event of international significance in immunology, medical criminology and human rights.

== Biography ==
Bagasra was born on the border of Pakistan and India in the royal state of Junagadh in 1948 at the eve of Indo-Pak partition and Pakistani independence, while his family immigrated to their new homeland, Pakistan. He came from a Memon businessmen family, born in the household of Mr. Habib Ahmed Bagasra and Mrs Amina Habib. The family settled in Karachi after their arrival in Pakistan, where he had his early and higher secondary schooling from Karachi. He completed his bachelor's in microbiology and master's in biochemistry, both from the University of Karachi, in 1968 and 1970, respectively. He proceeded to United States to do his doctorate in the early 1970s, completing his Ph.D. in microbiology and immunology, from the University of Louisville, Louisville, Kentucky in 1979. Finally, his long-standing interest in medicine motivated him to pursue a career in medicine by enrolling and completing his Doctor of Medicine (MD) from the Universidad Autónoma de Ciudad Juárez in 1985. He completed his residency in pathology from the Temple University School of Medicine in 1993 and a string of fellowships in clinical laboratory immunology and infectious disease from Temple University, Philadelphia and the Albany Medical College, New York, respectively.

His graduate advisors included John H. Wallace (University of Louisville, KY), John M Mansfield (University of Louisville, KY), and Harold W. Lischner (Temple University, PA).

He is currently a tenured professor of biology (and the director) at the South Carolina Center for Biotechnology, Claflin University, as well as a clinical professor of pathology, microbiology and immunology, with the University of South Carolina School of Medicine. He is also an adjunct professor with a number of reputed medical schools, most notably the department of epidemiology and biostatistics, Univ. of South Carolina. He is also a reviewer with one of the most reputed journals of science, Science.

He is author of two books in biotechnology, HIV and Molecular Immunity and In-situ PCR Technique, latter with his co-author John Hansen.

Other than his services to medicine and his innovative techniques in biotechnology, he is known for his role as a reviewer and investigator of the notorious HIV trial in Libya, where, allegedly, some children were injected with the virus for AIDS, the HIV, by some local and expatriate medical staff working then in Libya. He published opinion pieces (in the "Libyan Journal of Medicine") disputing the findings of large studies published in the leading journals Nature and The New England Journal of Medicine.

His most notable student so far is Mazhar Kanak, MD, PhD, who is an assistant professor, VCU School of Medicine Department of Surgery (in the Division of Transplant Surgery), as well as the assistant director of the Islet Cell Transplant Lab, an important pioneering lab in the area of Islet cells, both at the Virginia Commonwealth University.

He has one son, an infectious diseases specialist, and a daughter who is a psychology professor.

He is currently involved with the development and critique of various bona fide endeavors in finding a viable vaccine for the Zika virus.

== Awards and honors ==
He is a recipient of a number of awards and honors, which most notably include, as follows;

1995: Nomination for the “King Faisal Award in Medicine”

2002: Recipient of the AACR Faculty Scholar Award in Cancer Research

2004: Nomination for the 2005 Governor's Awards for Excellence in Science

2005: Received the Outstanding Teacher Award by Claflin University.

2005: Elected “member of the Nominating Committee for the 2005-2006 AACR-MICR-Jane Cook Wright Lectureship.”

2006: Co-Winner of the South Carolina Governor's Award for Science Awareness

2006: Winner of the Link Award

2008: Winner of James E. Hunter Award for outstanding performance in teaching & Educational Development. Claflin University May 10 08.

2010: Nominated for “The 2010 Louisa Gross Horwitz Prize for Biology or Biochemistry” Award

2011: Recognition Certification from the American Society of Microbiology for "Outstanding Service to Minority Mentoring Program

2012: Winner of the First James E. Clyburn Health Disparities Leadership Award

2014: Winner of Attorney William H. and Annette B. Johnson Endowed Annual Faculty Award for Innovative Scientific Research
