= Richard Attias =

Moroccan events producer (born 1959)

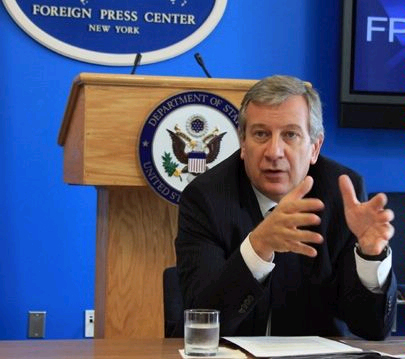
- Attias in 2011
- Born: 19 November 1959 (age 67); Fes, Morocco
- Education: Institut National des Sciences Appliquées de Toulouse; Paris University
- Occupation: Businessman
- Spouse: Cécilia Ciganer-Albéniz (m. 2008)

Richard Attias (born 19 November 1959) is a Moroccan events producer, founder and former chairman of PublicisLive and currently the executive chairman of Richard Attias and Associates. He is also the founder of The New York Forum and the co-founder of the Clinton Global Initiative and the Nobel Laureates Conference. From 1995 to 2008, he was the Executive Producer of the Davos Forum. He is the Chairman of the Executive Committee of the Future Investment Initiative

== Background ==
Attias was born into a Moroccan Jewish family in the imperial city of Fes. He graduated as a civil engineer from the Institut national des sciences appliquées de Toulouse, and got a master in Mathematics and Physics from the Paris University. He began his career as a sales executive at IBM France and in 1986 became the general manager of Econocom France and Econocom Japan, a computer leasing company.

During the 1990s, Attias founded an Event Management Company and produced various global events including the Zurich Insurances, Egypt Economic Development Conference for the Egyptian Government, IBM, conventions and Boris Yeltsin's visit to France.

Attias sold part of his company to Publicis in 1998 and founded a company which produced events for various clients including IBM, l'Oreal, Unilever, BT, Avaya, Lenovo, EDF, Sanofi-Aventis, and different governments.

Attias was named chairman of the board of Publicis Dialog which combined the operations of Publicis Events and a range of marketing services. In 2004, Attias moved to New York and became chairman of Publicis Events Worldwide.

Attias was the chairman the Advisory Board of the Center on Capitalism and Society from 2009 to 2010.

In 2009, Attias founded Richard Attias and Associates, a strategic consulting firm, where he works as Executive chairman. In December 2013, WPP, the global marketing services company, has taken a 30% stake in RA&A. In January 2019, WPP sold the stake back to the RA&A shareholders.

Since October 2013, Attias is a member of the 4Afrika Advisory Council, an external board of advisers tasked with guiding strategic investments undertaken by the Microsoft 4Afrika Initiative.

=== The New York Forum ===
In 2010, he founded The New York Forum, an annual meeting to promote economic leadership and the New York Forum AFRICA in 2012. The first New York Forum AFRICA took place in Libreville, Gabon, from 8 to 10 June.

The fourth edition of The New York Forum has been held at the NY Public Library on 21 September 2014. The two main topics of discussions were 'Is technology killing jobs?' and 'What will be the economic impact of climate change?'. On 19 May 2020, the New York Forum Institute hosted its first virtual roundtable, “Resilient World: An African call for a New World Order,” with five African Presidents.

=== Doha GOALS Forum ===
In 2012, he launched the Doha GOALS Forum, a gathering of sport's leaders, whose purpose is to use sports as a development tool.

=== Other programs ===
In 2008, Attias was named special advisor to the Emirate of Dubai to provide a comprehensive strategy to make the city a destination for major conferences, and cultural and sporting events.

From 5 to 7 February 2014, the first edition of the Build Africa Forum took place in Brazzaville (Republic of the Congo). Organized by RA&A under the High Patronage of Denis Sassou Nguesso, President of the Republic of the Congo, it is the premier international business & investment forum focused on infrastructure in Africa.

RA&A organized the XVth Francophonie Summit, the biennial meeting of the Organisation Internationale de la Francophonie (OIF). The event was held in Dakar, Senegal in 2014, with approximately 3000 participants. For the first time, the summit was concluded by an economic forum on 1–2 December. During this event, many political leaders, and CEO proposed to reinforce the links between this community, such as Macky Sall, Alain Juppé, or Thierry Breton.

In 2015, he organised the Egypt Economic Development Conference.

== Other activities ==
- Microsoft, Member of the 4Afrika Advisory Council (since 2013)

== Personal life ==
In 2008, Attias married the former First Lady of France, Cecilia Ciganer-Albeniz. He has lived in France, Switzerland, Japan, Dubai and New York.

Attias also currently serves as vice president for the Cecilia Attias Foundation for Women, which supports non-profit organizations dedicated to promoting women's well-being and equality worldwide.

Attias completed his studies in civil engineering at the Institut national des sciences appliquées de Toulouse, and earned a master's degree in mathematics and physics from the University of Paris.
