= HIV trial in Libya =

Controversy in Libya

This Libyan magazine first broke the story. The cover illustrates the intense public reaction in favor of the charges.

The HIV trial in Libya (or Bulgarian nurses affair) concerns the trials, appeals and eventual release of six foreign medical workers charged with conspiring to deliberately infect over 400 children with HIV in 1998, causing an epidemic at El-Fatih Children's Hospital in Benghazi, Libya. About 56 of the infected children had died by August 2007. The total number of victims rose to 131 in 2022.

The defendants, arrested in 1999, were five Bulgarian nurses (often termed "medics") and a Palestinian medical intern. They were first sentenced to death, then had their case remanded to Libya's highest court, and were sentenced to death again, a penalty which was upheld by Libya's highest court in early July 2007. The six then had their sentences commuted to life in prison by a Libyan government panel. They were released following a deal reached with European Union representatives on humanitarian issues; the EU did not condone the guilty verdict in Libya against the six. On 24 July 2007, the five medics and the doctor were extradited to Bulgaria, where their sentences were commuted by the Bulgarian President Georgi Parvanov and they were freed. Furthermore, a controversy has arisen concerning the terms of release, which allegedly include an arms trade as well as a civilian nuclear cooperation agreement signed by French President Nicolas Sarkozy in July 2007. Both the French and Bulgarian presidents have denied that the two deals were related to the liberation of the six, although this has been alleged by a variety of sources, including Saif al-Islam Gaddafi, son of former Libyan leader Muammar Gaddafi.

The epidemic at El-Fatih and the subsequent trials were highly politicized and controversial. The medics say that they were forced to confess under torture and that they are innocent. Saif al-Islam Gaddafi later confirmed that Libyan investigators tortured the medics with electric shocks and threatened to target their families in order to extract the confessions, and confirmed that some of the children had been infected with HIV before the medics arrived in Libya. He said that the guilty verdict of the Libyan courts had been based on "conflicting reports" and said, "There is negligence, there is a disaster that took place, there is a tragedy, but it was not deliberate."

Some of the world's foremost HIV experts had written to courts and the Libyan government on the medics' behalf, blaming the epidemic on poor hygiene practices in the hospital. The epidemic is the largest documented outbreak of HIV within a hospital in history, and it was the first time HIV/AIDS became a public issue in Libya. Virologists Luc Montagnier and Vittorio Colizzi, supported the medics' case, and reaction to their convictions was swift, with a number of appeals from scientific and human rights organizations, and various official condemnations of the verdict along with diplomatic initiatives.

Three of the Bulgarian medics published autobiographical books regarding the trial: Eight and a Half Years Hostage of Gaddafi by Kristiyana Vulcheva, In Gaddafi's Cage by Snezhana Dimitrova and Notes from Hell by Valya Cherveniashka and Nikolay Yordanov.

== El-Fatih epidemic in Libya and accusations ==
The El-Fatih epidemic is the largest documented incident of nosocomial (hospital-induced) infection of HIV in history. The Libyan public was enraged and many foreign medical workers were arrested; six were eventually charged. Libyan leader Muammar Gaddafi initially blamed the CIA or Mossad for plotting to carry out a deadly experiment on the Libyan children.

The crisis first came to light in November 1998 when Libyan La magazine (issue 78) published an exposé about AIDS at the hospital. In December, the Association of Libyan Writers reported over 60 HIV cases so far that year in Libya. La interviewed Sulaiman al-Ghemari, Libyan Minister for Health, who told them that most of the cases concerned children. Parents suspected their children had been infected through blood transfusions in Benghazi's main children's hospital. Although La magazine was shut down, it was eventually revealed that over 400 children had been infected. Libya requested and received an emergency WHO team, which was sent in December and stayed through January 1999. The WHO team issued a classified report on the situation.

In February 1999, the Bulgarian embassy announced that 23 Bulgarian medical workers had been detained. A week later they were informed by Libyan authorities that "precautionary measures" had been taken against Bulgarian doctors and nurses working at the Benghazi Children’s Hospital. Most of the nurses were recruited by Bulgarian state-owned company Expomed to work at the Libyan hospital, where pay was considerably higher than they could receive at home, beginning work in February 1998. On 7 March 1999, six members of the group subjected to "precautionary measures" were formally arrested on a warrant in connection with the HIV infections of children in Benghazi. The group consisted of Ashraf al-Hadzhudzh, a Palestinian intern, and Bulgarian nurses Kristiyana Valtcheva, Nasya Nenova, Valentina Siropulo, Valya Chervenyashka and Snezhana Dimitrova. They later became widely known as "Ashraf al-Hajuj, a Palestinian doctor".

== Libyan HIV victims ==
Well over 400 children were infected with HIV at the El-Fatih Children's Hospital. Some were receiving treatment in Europe. The death toll went up to 50. Parents and relatives of the children protested, and demanded that death penalties be carried out against those responsible. Libyan prime minister Shukri Ghanem insisted that the outcome of the trial was entirely a judicial matter. In a statement broadcast on Al Jazeera, Ghanem said that all efforts should now be focused on the infected children, "who are subject to a death sentence each day." The families of the infected children also demanded compensation for the actions taken by the convicted medics; figures of up to $10 million per family were mentioned. In July 2007, Libya announced a settlement had been reached, with $400 million going to the 426 victims' families in exchange for conversion of the nurses' sentences from death to life in prison.

== Defendants ==
Initially, 23 foreign medical personnel, mostly Bulgarian, were arrested; 17 were subsequently released and returned to Bulgaria. Additionally, 11 Libyan nationals were arrested and charged with the alleged crimes. Doctor Zdravko Georgiev went to Libya to see his wife (Valtcheva) and was subsequently detained and tried on the charge of illegally transacting in foreign currency. Several Libyans were also arrested and tried on non-capital offences: Abdul Azis Husein Mohammed Shembesh, Abdul Menam Ahmed Mohammed al-Sherif, Idris Maatuk Mohammed al-Amari, Salim Ibrahim Suleyman Abe Garara, Mansur al-Mansur Saleh al-Mauhub, Nureddin Abdulhamid Halil Dagman and Saad Musa Suleyman al-Amruni.

=== Ashraf Ahmed al-Hadzhudzh ===
Ashraf al-Hadzhudzh was defendant number one in the case. In the prosecution's view he was a man in a deadly criminal ring of female nurses dedicated to a plot involving agents of foreign governments; large sums of money; illegal, adulterous sex; and illegal alcohol. He was convicted of murdering 426 Libyan children in carrying out the plot, with the intention of destabilizing the country. He was an intern who started working at the hospital two months before news of the epidemic broke out. His family fled Libya to the Netherlands because, according to them, they had been portrayed by the Libyan media as "killers of innocent children". Ashraf's cousin in the Palestinian Territories As'ad El-Hajouj, told the Turkish Daily News that Ashraf had lost an eye and that one of his hands had been paralyzed due to torture endured in prison. Ashraf al-Hadzhudzh was granted Bulgarian citizenship on 19 June 2007.

=== Kristiyana Vulcheva ===
Kristiyana Vulcheva, wife of Zdravko Georgiev, was not recruited by Expomed. She was charged along with the others, but was ultimately found not guilty of all charges after initially having been convicted of currency violations. Purported by the prosecution to be the ringleader of the plot, it was claimed that she spoke Arabic and had a luxurious lifestyle. The other four testified that they had never seen Vulcheva before their blindfolds were taken off after their kidnapping by Libyan security, when they were first brought to the police compound in February 1999. Vulcheva was also the only one charged and convicted of illegally distilling alcohol. The defense pointed out that no device used to do this was produced at trial. She admitted in court to having seen Ashraf at the Benghazi Children's Hospital. Unlike Ashraf, she never confessed to having sexual relations with him, which is required for a conviction for the crime of adultery under Libyan law. She retracted her confession that vials were given to her by a British citizen which were used to infect the children, denying knowing any such person as "John the Englishman" or having been paid "large sums of money" to infect the children. After the re-imposition of the death sentence in 2006 it was announced that Vulcheva would be seeking to have Vladimir Sheitanov represent her again. Plamen Yalnuzov had replaced him as representative for the Bulgarians in 2002.

After the verdict her mother made a public plea: "We are sending our plea to the British government and the victims of Lockerbie. We are well aware the issue is painful to all, but in the name of the most humane of the professions we ask them to be merciful and let Megrahi go.", referring to Abdelbaset al-Megrahi who was serving a life sentence in Scotland for the Lockerbie bombing.

Gaddafi has repeatedly compared the two cases. After the 2006 verdict he said, "Organisations like the Arab League, the non-aligned movement and the Islamic Conference said al-Megrahi was a political prisoner and international observers said elements of foreign intelligence were present at the trial... Nobody asked for his release."

=== Nasya Nenova ===
Nasya Nenova attempted suicide. She testified that she confessed and attempted suicide because she was afraid she would be tortured again. She was interrogated alongside Ashraf and told the court they were beaten and that there was no interpreter. She did not confess to having illegal sexual relations with him. She, along with Vulcheva, are the only nurses who admitted knowing Ashraf by sight beforehand, but she said she had never spoken with him. She denied having attempted suicide out of guilt for what she had done. In court she stated that "I am not guilty on any of the counts. My conscience is clear." and "We had protection from no one, we had no doctor. We were alone there with those men who did everything they wanted to do". She said she attempted to retract her confession on 17 July 1999, but that a Colonel Juma came and threatened to renew the torture if she persisted.

She is seeking to reappoint Vladimir Sheitanov as a replacement for defence attorneys Yalnyzov and Byzanti after the 2006 death sentence.

=== Valya Chervenyashka ===
Valya Cherveniashka in 2008

She is from Byala Slatina. She was recruited by Expomed company. Her husband, Emil Uzunov, in a 2003 interview with Bulgarian National Radio (BNR) said that the defense lawyer Bizanti was one of the torturers who beat the six medics during the initial interrogations. Chervenyashka had to correct the story. "I suppose my husband was too nervous and over-reacted," she said.

Her daughter Antoaneta Uzunova has commented on the case. "It's been terrible...The charges were absurd then, they remain absurd now," she said in 2005. "When I heard them being described as CIA agents...I knew what would happen," said Uzunova, 28. "Then we found out our loved ones had been tortured in a most cruel way. It's a nightmare."

At another time, she said "Nurses from little towns in Bulgaria acting as agents of Mossad? It all sounds funny and absurd until you realize your mother could die for it."

She is seeking to reappoint Vladimir Sheitanov as a replacement for defense attorneys Yalnyzov and Byzanti after the 2006 death sentence.

In 2009, Cherveniashka co-wrote with the Bulgarian screenwriter Nikolay Yordanov a biographical book about her years in Libya. The book, titled Notes from Hell, was published in Bulgaria on 20 November 2009 and in South Africa in February 2010. It was published again as e-book in 2014 in Bulgarian and English and then in French as "Notes De L’enfer: Une historie vraie" in 2007. In November 2018, the English edition was recorded as audiobook, recorded by British actress Nano Nagle.

=== Snezhana Dimitrova ===
Dimitrova did not arrive at the hospital until 10 August 1998. She was recruited by Expomed. She is the only one of the condemned to have been picked up for questioning in the roundup of medical workers on 14 December 1998. She was held for two days, and then rearrested with the others on 10 February 1999.

In a handwritten 2003 declaration to the Bulgarian Foreign Ministry, Snezhana Dimitrova, described torture that had included electric shocks and beatings.

"They tied my hands behind my back," she wrote. "Then they hung me from a door. It feels like they are stretching you from all sides. My torso was twisted and my shoulders were dislocated from their joints from time to time. The pain cannot be described. The translator was shouting, 'Confess or you will die here."'

=== Valentina Siropulo ===
"I confessed during torture with electricity. They put small wires on my toes and on my thumbs. Sometimes they put one on my thumb and another on my tongue, neck or ear. It had a hand crank to make it go. They had two kinds of machines, one with a crank and one with buttons."

=== Zdravko Georgiev ===
Zdravko Georgiev, the husband of Kristiana Vulcheva, came to Libya after his wife was arrested. He was charged along with the others but ultimately was found not guilty of all charges after having been once convicted of currency violations.

=== Defense team ===
- Libyan defence attorney Othman al-Bizanti
- Egyptian defence attorney Amin Aly ElDeeb
- Danail Beshkov, Libyan medical consultant to the defence
- Vladimir Sheitanov
- Plamen Yalnuzov

== Scientific studies and reports ==
=== The WHO Report of P.N. Shrestha (1999) ===
The World Health Organization (WHO) report (1999) describes the visit performed by the WHO team (P.N. Shrestha, A. Eleftherious and V. Giacomet) to Tripoli, Sirte and Benghazi 28 December 1998 to 11 January 1999, while the Bulgarians were still on staff.

=== Montagnier/Colizzi ===
There have been several reports done on the HIV outbreak. The most important of these, the Final Report of Luc Montagnier and Vittorio Colizzi, was commissioned by the Libyan Jamahiriya, and arranged through UNESCO. Montagnier and Colizzi had access to all the files of the infected subjects available at the Hospital as well as samples from European hospitals that had taken some of the sick children, as well as the samples at El-Fatih.

Their report concluded that the infection at the hospital resulted from poor hygiene and reuse of syringes, and that the infections began before the arrival of the nurses and doctor in 1998. Through hospital records and the DNA sequences of the virus, they traced it to patient n.356 who was admitted 28 times between 1994–97 in Ward B, ISO and Ward A, and theorized that this patient was the probable source of the infection. The first cross-contamination occurred during that patient's 1997 admission. The report concludes that the admission records of a total of 21 of the children "definitively prove that the HIV infection in the Al-Fatih Hospital was already active in 1997" and that "Ward B was already heavily contaminated in November 1997."

Montagnier and Colizzi both testified in person at the trial of record for the defense, and the report was submitted in evidence.

=== Final report of Luc Montagnier and Vittorio Colizzi ===
Luc Montagnier (Paris) and Vittorio Colizzi (Rome) were appointed as international scientific consultants by the Secretary of the Libyan Arab Jamahiriya.

=== Libyan report ===
The prosecution advanced a contrary report drawn up by a Libyan expert panel. The scientific community became politically embroiled in events when the criminal court in Benghazi rejected Montagnier/Colizzi in favor of the conclusions of the Libyan experts. After the conviction, Colizzi said the scientific evidence being used against them "is so irrational it's unbelievable" and the verdict read "like a bad spy film."

=== Genetic analysis first published in Nature ===
On 6 December 2006, the science journal Nature published a new study which examined the mutation history of the HIV found in blood samples from some of the children, and concluded that a number of those children had been infected well before the six defendants arrived in Libya. In addition, a common ancestor of the strains that infected the children was already present in Libya. The study was based on statistical models of the rate of evolution in HIV derived from previous outbreaks. The publication was reported in newspapers world-wide and sparked an editorial campaign by Nature calling for the acquittal of the defendants.

The authors of the study agreed to make fully available all the data they had used so that independent confirmations could be made.

=== Libyan Journal of Medicine: How Do We Find the Truth? ===
Omar Bagasra and his group discussed in detail the previous published reports and asked for examination of the CD4+ T lymphocytes of the infected children to exclude the possibility of their intentional infection with HIV. Their hypothesis is that the children were infected as part of an AIDS vaccine trial.

=== Nobel Laureates ===
114 Nobel Laureates in the sciences co-signed an open letter to Libyan leader Muammar Gaddafi calling for a fair trial.

== Torture ==
All of the defendants said they had been tortured. This was later confirmed by Saif al-Islam Gaddafi, son of the leader of Libya. He said that the confessions were extracted through torture with electric shocks and threats targeted at the medics' families, and confirmed that some of the children had been infected with HIV before the medics arrived in Libya. He said that the guilty verdict of the Libyan courts had been based on "conflicting reports", and said that

"There is negligence, there is a disaster that took place, there is a tragedy, but it was not deliberate."

Ashraf al-Hadzhudzh has reportedly lost an eye, and one of his hands has been paralyzed. Snezhana Dimitrova declared that her hands were tied behind her back and she was hung from a door dislocating her shoulders, and that she was told to "confess or you will die here." Nasya Nenova testified that "We were alone there with those men who did everything they wanted to do." In May 2005 Human Rights Watch interviewed them in Jadida prison.

In her book, Valya Cherveniashka describes the torture sessions in detail. In the chapter "The Red Carpet" she describes first day of interrogation:

One of the interrogators pulled out a thick black cable and swiped it at me. The first blow cut through my heels with a pain I had never experienced. I was being whipped! I tried to twist my body to deflect each blow to my feet. It hurt terribly. Every few seconds I felt excruciating pain... I don’t remember how many times my feet were whipped. I didn’t even have the strength to scream. I fainted and they took me down. When I came to I was hung up again and the sadistic whipping continued. About ten men took turns whipping me and they were relentless. When one got tired, the next immediately took over. I did not cry, I did not moan. Somehow I resigned myself to the thought that I was going to die. I can’t explain this feeling. I thought it could get no worse. I fainted again. I heard, "Collapsed, collapsed! She fainted, she fainted!

Ashraf al-Hadzhudzh, the Palestinian intern, told Human Rights Watch "We had barbaric, sadistic torture for a crime we didn’t do...They used electric shocks, drugs, beatings, police dogs, sleep prevention...The confession was like multiple choice, and when I gave a wrong answer they shocked me."

Valentina Siropulo told Human Rights Watch "I confessed during torture with electricity. They put small wires on my toes and on my thumbs. Sometimes they put one on my thumb and another on either my tongue, neck or ear."

Kristiana Valcheva said interrogators used a small machine with cables and a handle that produced electricity, saying that "During the shocks and torture they asked me where the AIDS came from and what is your role..." She said that Libyan interrogators subjected her to electric shocks on her breasts and genitals. "My confession was all in Arabic without translation, [...] We were ready to sign anything just to stop the torture."

Lawyers for the accused medical personnel have asked for 5 million Libyan dinars (approx. €3.1million/US$3.7 million as of 2005) as compensation. Much of the evidence is based on medical reports prepared by authorities from Bulgaria relating to marks and scars on the defendants. All of the accused Libyans deny the charges, and none of them were jailed. After several procedural delays, their trial began in late May 2005. On 7 June 2005, the 10 defendants were acquitted.

The prisoners were sued by several Libyan police officers for slandering them with the allegations of torture. However, on 27 May 2007, the prisoners were acquitted of these charges and the plaintiffs ordered to pay the legal fees.

== Trials ==
The first case against the medics was brought in the People’s Court (Mahkamat al-Sha`b), a special court for crimes against the state. The trial began on 7 February 2000. The charges were: intentionally "murdering with a lethal substance (Article 371 of the Penal Code), randomly killing with the aim of attacking the security of the State (Article 202), and causing an epidemic through spreading harmful virus, leading to the death of persons (Article 305)." In addition, the Bulgarians were accused of acting contrary to Libyan customs and traditions, by engaging in non-marital sexual relations and drinking alcohol in public places, distilling alcohol and illegally transacting in foreign currency.

In April 2001 Libyan leader Muammar Gaddafi made a speech at the African summit on HIV/AIDS. He told the conference that the world AIDS epidemic started when "CIA laboratories lost control over the virus which they were testing on black Haitian prisoners." He called the HIV crisis in Benghazi "an odious crime" and questioned who was behind it. "Some said it was the CIA. Others said it was the Mossad Israeli intelligence. They carried out an experiment on these children." He went on to say that the trial would be "an international trial, like the Lockerbie trial."

=== First trial ===
The defendants all pled not guilty. The prosecution submitted the defendant's confessions in evidence, but the defendants all repudiated their confessions. They gave interviews and testified at trial that they were forced to confess by the use of torture. This led to charges being filed against 10 Libyan security personnel, some of whom later claimed they had also been tortured to confess that they had tortured the medics. The guards were eventually acquitted in subsequent trials.

The prosecution described a plot to disrupt Libya by foreign secret services. "To those services, child killing is nothing new. In this way they want to prevent Libya from playing an important role in the Arab World and to disturb calm in the country. The killing of the children by that virus is a means by which those secret services achieve their ends." In calling for the death penalty the prosecutor said: "These people have no moral human feelings once they have killed those children. They have sold themselves to the devil, even though the Jamahiriya has given them the right to work and live without let or hindrance." He described the epidemic as a "national catastrophe."

The defendants denied being part of a conspiracy. Nenova, Chervenyashka, Siropoulo and Dimitrova testified that they did not know Vulcheva until 24 hours after what they called their "kidnapping" from Benghazi, and, according to Nenova, only after their blindfolds were taken off. Vulcheva denied knowing John the Englishman or Adel the Egyptian. They all denied that they had been paid "large sums of money" to infect the children. Nenova and Vulcheva admitted that they had seen Ashraf at the Benghazi Children's Hospital, but testified that they did not communicate with him and did not perform any tasks assigned by him.

The defense lawyers argued that physical evidence on all the charges was lacking, including, the blood bottles alleged to contain contaminated plasma, the device alleged to have been used by Kristiyana Vulcheva to distil alcohol, the syringes which were alleged to have been used to commit the crime, and the photos alleged to show sexual relationships between the defendants. Lawyer Sheitanov, argued that the medics had neither the time nor the conditions to carry out a conspiracy to commit the crime, since Nenova, Siropoulo and Chervenyashka started work at the children's hospital on 17 February 1998, Dimitrova on 10 August and Ashraf on 1 August 1998.

A year after the trial began, the People's Court ruled that it did not have jurisdiction in the matter:

"The People's Court has the jurisdiction to pronounce itself on state security-related cases and believes itself incompetent on this matter, the spreading of HIV which caused the death of more than one person is a fact, but the claims that the defendants were conspiring against the Libyan state are dubious and controversial"

The case was then bound over to ordinary criminal court. The People's Court was disbanded in 2005.

=== Second trial ===
The second trial took place in the Benghazi Appeals Court, beginning 8 July 2003. The judges were from Derna, a town neighboring Benghazi. Judges from Tripoli and Benghazi refused to take on the case due to the high level of public sentiment in those cities. Tight security measures were in place. Police officers with submachine guns guarded the venue as relatives of the children gathered in front.

The prosecutor stated that the case documents did not reflect the real number of children. The real number of children is 429. A report by prominent AIDS experts Luc Montagnier and Vittorio Colizzi was admitted in evidence.

Luc Montagnier and Vittorio Colizzito were called to testify in person on behalf of the medics.

Professor Montagnier, the co-discoverer of the Human Immuno-deficiency Virus (HIV), testified that the virus in the 393 children studied is a rare type found mostly in West Africa, but also throughout the continent. Montagnier told the court that the outbreak was probably started by an infected child admitted for treatment at the hospital. He said that injection was not the only possible means of infection: Any other manipulation involving penetration of the skin, or even multiple use of the same oxygen mask, could have transmitted the virus. Montagnier was certain that the epidemic at the hospital started about a year before the Bulgarian nurses were hired. He said he was familiar with the case before his first visit to Libya in 1999 because he was in the process of studying the cases of hundreds of HIV-positive children from El-Fatih that were being examined or treated in hospitals in Switzerland, France and Italy. At the time he was working on these cases, some of the children did not yet have the symptoms because the incubation period of the virus is about 10 years.

Under cross-examination, Montagnier stated that it is possible to preserve the virus and then reactivate it if it has been held in plasma. It could be kept active for several days, depending on how it is stored. He testified that he was not aware of the existence of the technical capacity in Libya for monitoring this kind of storage, either during the epidemic or currently. Montagnier testified that during his first visit, the health authorities in Libya and the management of the Benghazi hospital showed serious concern over the infection, and that at the time they had no idea of the cause of the epidemic's spread.

When questioned by the Bulgarian defense, he affirmed that the infection could have started outside the hospital ward where the Bulgarians were working.

The Court ordered a new expert study of the case record. It received the report from the Libyan panel in December. Contrary to the findings of Luc Montagnier and Vittorio Colizzi, this panel concluded that there was no evidence that an in-hospital infection led to the AIDS outbreak at the Benghazi hospital that affected 426 children. The Libyan doctors concluded that the mass infections were more likely due to deliberate actions.

Two of the Libyan experts were brought in to testify for the prosecution, Awad Abudjadja of the Libyan national committee on AIDS and Busha Allo, head of the infectious diseases ward of the Al Jamahiriya hospital in Tripoli. They testified that the virus load in the blood of the infected children was too high, an indication that the infection was intentional.

Another Libyan virologist Salim Al-Agiri was summoned by the defence. He told the court that the infection at the Benghazi children's hospital was due to lack of prevention and poor control.

The prosecutors called for the death penalty based on Nassya Nenova's confession. Nenova admitted in writing to injecting children with contaminated products that she had gotten from the Palestinian Ashraf al-Hadzhudzh. According to the confession she was unaware that they contained HIV, and believed she was testing a new drug. Nenova withdrew her confession before the Libyan People's Court in 2001 and told that court they were extracted under duress. Libyan law disregards confessions extracted with violence.

The prosecutors claimed that Kristiana Vulcheva acted as the mastermind. They introduced transcripts of her bank accounts and said she performed money transfers, paying the other defendants. The prosecutors averred that Vulcheva had a luxurious lifestyle and that she speaks Arabic, citing that as a further proof of her guilt.

One piece of material evidence which they said called for the death penalty were five containers of plasma protein found to contain four varieties of HIV according to a report by Awad Abudadjadja, a coordinator of the Libyan national committee on AIDS.

On 6 May 2004 the Criminal Court in Benghazi sentenced to death by firing squad: Ashraf al-Hadzhudzh, Kristiyana Valtcheva, Nasya Nenova, Valentina Siropulo, Valya Chervenyashka and Snezhana Dimitrova, finding them guilty for the intentional infection of 426 Libyan children with AIDS. Zdravko Georgiev was found guilty of illegal transactions in foreign currency and sentenced to four years in prison and a fine of 600 dinars. He was ordered released for time served.

In public after the conviction Colizzi called the scientific evidence used against them "so irrational it's unbelievable" and said the verdict read "like a bad spy film."

=== Retrial ===
The convictions were appealed to the Libyan Supreme Court which heard the case beginning on 29 March 2005. The defense urged the court to revoke the death sentences and remand the case to the lower courts for retrial. Under Libyan law, the court could not accept any new evidence, although the defense team argued that there was wrongly interpreted evidence during the court sessions so far. There were a number of delays and postponements. Eventually the Supreme Court revoked the death sentences and ordered a new trial.

Bulgarian president Georgi Parvanov said the court ruling "confirmed our hope that justice in this case will prevail." President Parvanov added: "The unfair death sentences were reversed. ...We hope that the swiftness and the effectiveness demonstrated by the Libyan court in the past days will help solve the case as soon as possible."

US State Department spokesman, Justin Higgins, described the decision as a "positive development since it removes the risk of the death penalty being carried out. As we have made clear before, we believe a way should be found to allow the medics to return to their home." The Council of Europe welcomed the decision and said it hoped the new trial will "comply with the internationally recognised standards of fairness and due process."

On 19 December 2006, the court pronounced its verdict in the retrial, all six were guilty, and again sentenced to death by firing squad. Following the verdict the court published a 100-page document on the website of Libya Today newspaper explaining its decision.

According to the document:

- The mothers of the HIV-infected children do not carry the virus
- Unnaturally high levels of HIV in the children's blood testified to the fact that the infection was intentional.
- The infection only spread in the specific hospital rooms that the five nurses were serving.

The research by the World Health Organization showed that the HIV infected children also had Hepatitis C, which was proof that the infection was intentional and malicious. However, co-infection with Hepatitis was emphasized as indicating poor hygiene and reuse of syringes by the WHO study authors themselves, as well as all of the other non-Libyan studies used by the defense, the opposite conclusion to this analysis by the court.

The court also said that it was not willing to accept the fact that the five were tortured because another court has already waived this accusation, and found therefore that the defendants all confessed in full consciousness and without being subject to any violence or torture.

== Commutation to life sentence ==
On 17 July 2007, Libya's High Judicial Council, its highest judicial body, announced that the sentences would be converted to life imprisonment. Earlier that day, Libya negotiated a $400 million settlement with the families of 426 HIV victims. The Judicial Council received authority to review the case after the Supreme Court upheld the death sentences one week prior to the commutation. The Judicial Council is controlled by the government and can commute sentences or grant pardons.

== Terms of release ==
On 24 July 2007, the French President Nicolas Sarkozy officially announced that French and European representatives had obtained the extradition of the prisoners, including the Palestinian doctor, who had been granted Bulgarian citizenship a month earlier. They left Libya on a French government plane, with the EU's external affairs commissioner, Benita Ferrero-Waldner, and the then wife of the French President, Cécilia Sarkozy, who traveled twice to Libya.

During his investiture speech as President beginning of May 2007, Sarkozy had alluded to the nurses, declaring: "France will be to the sides of the Libyan nurses [sic] detained since 8 years..."

The six prisoners were released after extensive negotiations between the EU (including Bulgaria, and particularly France's President Nicolas Sarkozy and his wife) and Libya. As a result of the resolution of the crisis, negotiations for further restoring Libya's ties to the EU are in progress.

A 1985 prisoner-exchange agreement between Bulgaria and Libya was the legal instrument used for the transfer; technically Libya did not free the medics but rather allowed them to serve their sentences in Bulgaria. On landing in Sofia, however, they were pardoned by the Bulgarian President, Georgi Parvanov.

The French President said that "some humanitarian mediation" by the "friendly" government of Qatar was decisive in helping with the release of the medics. Sarkozy claimed that no additional money was given by France, Bulgaria, or the European Union in addition to the amount stipulated in the private agreement previously reached with the Libyan families. He also confirmed that the release of the medics would allow him to perform an official visit to Libya to meet the Libyan president to negotiate other international issues.

The EU believes the six are innocent – Libya does not. Libya complained that the six should not have been pardoned once they reached Bulgaria. Libya petitioned the Arab League, and was supported by Oman, but, as of 31 July no definitive Arab League support had been decided on and no complaint had been filed with the EU.

The EU maintains it did not pay compensation to either the infected children or their families: according to Sarkozy, Europe did not pay "the slightest financial compensation" for the medics' release. However, the European Commission committed $461 million to the Benghazi International Fund. Also, Bulgaria cancelled a probably non-collectible $57 million debt owed by Libya, and humanitarian funds were made available for both the infecteds' treatment and for a new children's hospital in Benghazi. Saif Gaddafi declared that the humanitarian aid to the Benghazi hospital amounted to "not less than 300 million euros," which was denied by the French, who declared that it was largely overestimated. The Benghazi International Fund received from abroad 600 million Libyan dinars and Libya received promises of equipment and personnel to train of Libyan medics over a period of five years.

Initially Gaddafi's son, Saif al-Islam Gaddafi, contradicted Sarkozy's claim that no additional agreements had been made. In exchange for the release of the nurses, he said Nicolas Sarkozy not only signed with Gaddafi security, health care and immigration pacts (assistance with border management and scholarships for Libyan students in the EU) : according to Libyan sources cited by the Agence France-Presse, a $230 million (168 million euros) MILAN antitank missile sale was also part of the release deal.

Saif al-Islam announced the existence of these deals in an interview to Le Monde. EADS also confirmed it after Saif Gaddafi's declarations, contradicting the official position of the Elysée Palace. Another 128 million euro contract would have been signed, according to Tripoli, with EADS for a TETRA radio system. The Socialist Party (PS) and the Communist Party (PCF) criticized a "state affair" and a "barter" with a "rogue state". The leader of the PS, François Hollande, requested the opening of a parliamentary investigation. The Parliamentary Commission is expected to be created in October 2007. The French left asked for Cécilia Sarkozy to be heard by the Commission, as she had played an "important role" in the release of the six according to Pierre Moscovici (PS). Arnaud Montebourg had criticized her role, accusing her of having fast-tracked the Minister of Foreign Affairs, Bernard Kouchner, while Sarkozy himself praised his wife.

He also linked the release of the Bulgarian nurses and of the Palestinian physician to bilateral negotiations with the United Kingdom concerning the extradition of Abdelbaset al-Megrahi, convicted in the Lockerbie bombing case.

Following the controversy lifted by Saif Gaddafi's revelations concerning the arms deal, Sarkozy claimed that the arms contract was not connected to the liberation of the six, declaring: "The contract was not linked to the release of the nurses. What do they criticize me for? Getting contracts? Creating jobs for French workers?".

Furthermore, Saif Gaddafi retracted his 1 August statements three days later, claiming that the arms deal and the agreement for the delivery of a nuclear reactor were not linked to the liberation of the Bulgarian nurses. He stated that the deal with EADS had started 18 months ago, information that was confirmed by EADS.

Despite these denegations, it is commonly accepted that the arms deal would not have been possible if the six hadn't been freed, as Europe generally would have sided with Bulgaria on this issue. The head of the Bulgarian intelligence, General Kirtcho Kirov, declared that important arms contracts and oil contracts were at stake.

Additionally, President Sarkozy pledged to sell Libya three civil nuclear power stations as part of a package of trade and assistance that will boost the role of French companies in the oil-rich country. During his visit to Libya on 25 July 2007, Sarkozy signed an agreement of cooperation on civil nuclear technology. He decided to build three civil nuclear power stations for the Libyan state. According to Paris, the nuclear power stations are meant for desalinization of sea water, but Le Monde has pointed out that the Libyans quickly bypassed any reference to desalinization. This deal was criticized by the French left-wing and also by German governmental sources, including Deputy Foreign Minister Gernot Erler, Greens leader Reinhard Buetikofer and SPD deputy Ulrich Kelber. And during Tony Blair's visit end of May 2007, the British group BP signed a natural gas contract for 900 million dollars.

Furthermore, Le Parisien alleged on 13 August 2007 that the agreement concerning nuclear technologies did not concern desalinization of sea water, but focused in particular on the ERP third-generation nuclear reactor, worth $3 billion. The Parisian newspaper cited Philippe Delaune, the deputy of the deputy director of international affairs of the CEA atomic agency. It is the main share-holder of Areva, the firm which products ERP reactors. Although the French President denied any relationship between the deal with Areva and the liberation of the six, Le Parisien points out a troubling chronology: Areva was called to present its products to Libya at the end of June 2007, a short time before the release of the six. The French Socialist Party, through the voice of Jean-Louis Bianco, declared that this deal was "geopolitically irresponsible." The German government also denounced the agreement. Through Siemens, they retain 34% of the shares of Areva's subsidiary in charge of building the ERP (Areva NP).

This information from Le Parisien was immediately denied by Areva. Areva's spokesman did admit that negotiations had taken place early June 2007, but that no particular technology transfer had been agreed upon. Furthermore, Philippe Delaune, the CEA's spokesman, added that in any case, any transfer concerning the ERP technology would take at least ten or fifteen years.

While Areva did admit that general negotiations had taken place, Nicolas Sarkozy formally dismissed all of the story, claiming it was "false." Bulgarian President Georgy Parvanov also claimed that the arms and nuclear agreements were not related to the release of the nurses.

== Books ==
Three of the Bulgarian medics published auto-biographical books regarding the trial. Kristiyana Vulcheva's 8 and a half years hostage of Ghaddafi premiered in 2007. Snezhana Dimitrova's In Gaddafi's Cage was published a month later. In 2009 Valya Cherveniashka wrote her version of the story together with Nikolay Yordanov in Notes from Hell. Her book was published in South Africa in 2010, and re-issued worldwide as e-book in Bulgarian, English and French. In 2018 the English language edition was released as audiobook.

== Diplomatic front ==
There have been a number of diplomatic efforts to resolve the crisis.

On 24 December 2005, it was announced that Libya, Bulgaria, the EU and the US had agreed on the creation of a fund, which may have helped to resolve the matter. In the end, Saif al-Islam was heavily credited with the resolution of the crisis.

The Bulgarian independent daily newspaper Novinar published a set of 12 cartoons mocking Gaddafi, Libyan justice and the Bulgarian government's quiet diplomacy vis-à-vis the HIV trial. Publication of the cartoons caused outrage in Tripoli, and the Libyan ambassador in Sofia delivered a protest note to the Bulgarian Foreign Ministry. In response, the Bulgarian Deputy Foreign Minister, Feim Chaushev, and President Parvanov apologized and distanced themselves from the Novinar cartoons.

The six medics were again sentenced to death. EU Justice Commissioner Franco Frattini quickly expressed his shock at the verdict and called for the decision to be reviewed, as was done by the Bulgarian government and international organizations, including Amnesty International, the World Medical Association and the International Council of Nurses.

The Libyan foreign ministry said international response to the convictions and death sentences was disrespectful to the Libyan people. The foreign ministry also said (as reported by The Washington Post) "The political stance expressed by the Bulgarian government, the EU countries and others is a clear bias to[wards] certain values that are likely to trigger wars, conflicts and cause enmity between religions and civilizations."

== International: official positions ==
The trials have been condemned by The European Union, individual EU member nations, the United States and Russia.

The African Union (AU) Commission has expressed concern at what it calls "politicization" of the case. According to the Angola Press the AU Commission said all of Africa was monitoring the case with great interest, and that attempts to politicize the matter must stop forthwith. The AU also expressed solidarity with the families of the victims. It said people should not aggravate the tragic case, where 56 of the infected children have already succumbed to AIDS.

According to Sofia News Agency, The Arab League "asked all countries not to politicize the issue, as the accused have still one more chance for appealing their sentence. The League also underlined the need to be compassionate to the HIV-infected Libyan children in order to curb the consequences of this painful human catastrophe".

The Council of Europe passed Recommendation 1726 in 2005 titled "Serious human rights violations in Libya – Inhuman treatment of Bulgarian medical staff". The Committee of Ministers and the Parliamentary Assembly severely condemned this verdict which is contrary to the fundamental values they uphold....The Parliamentary Assembly...categorically condemns the barbaric way in which they were treated in the first few months after their arrest and the torture and ill-treatment to which they were subjected.

European Commission opposed the position of the Libyan court decision to sentence to death.

Ministry of Foreign Affairs – Alexander Yakovenko, Spokesman: "According to our information, the Bulgarian medics' lawyers intend to appeal this decision in the Supreme Court of Libya. For our part, we hope that an additional trial in Tripoli, "in which all the facts and the opinions of people involved in this case will be comprehensively examined."

The United States State Department did not agree with the decision of the court.

== NGOs: official positions ==
Many non-governmental organizations took a stand against the sentences.

In a statement on 6 May 2004, a statement from Amnesty International was released: "We are shocked by the imposition of these death sentences and call for the Libyan authorities to immediately quash them.

The ICN President Christine Hancock wrote: "The sentence is unjust, unwarranted and unacceptable." "We implore the Libyan government to rectify this dreadful situation as quickly as possible. The health workers are being unfairly held responsible for a tragedy which has caused outrage in Libya."

Yoram Blachar, chairman of the WMA Council, said after a meeting of the WMA wrote: "I appeal to the Libyan authorities to quash this sentence. It is completely unjustified."

Many newspapers and journals came out against the sentences.

== Development of media coverage ==
In Libya, La magazine (issue 78) published its exposé about AIDS at the hospital, but was shut down. Initial Bulgarian coverage focused on a scandal in the wake of the arrests when the Bulgarian news journal "24 hours" of 24 February published an investigation of money laundering at Expomed entitled, "How we [lost] USD 5,048,292 in Libya."

The trial received almost no public attention outside Libya and Bulgaria until an account by Eric Favereau was published in the French paper Libération on 2 June 2000 entitled "Libye : Six Bulgares accusés d’être à l’origine de 393 cas de sida Assassins d’enfants ou boucs émissaires de la Libye ? " (Libya: six Bulgarians accused of causing 392 Aids cases – Child killers or Libya's Scapegoats?). Libya had requested help and France, Italy and Switzerland had received some of the sick children. Eighty children were sent to France in May 1999. The Swiss paper Neue Zuercher Zeitung followed with the article "Bulgarians as Scapegoats" and the Washington Times picked up the story.

In April 2001 the trial gained brief attention after Muammar Gaddafi gave his speech at the African summit on HIV/AIDS implicating the CIA. Cold War era GRU defector Viktor Suvorov would claim on Radio Free Europe that the conspiracy theory espoused by Gaddafi about CIA creating HIV and letting it loose in Africa had been invented by the KGB and was still promoted by Russian secret services, who were controlling Libya.

This theory was widely published throughout the Balkans in Serbian and Greek newspaper articles. On 2 July 2001 The Washington Post ran a story by Peter Finn, interviewing Prof. Luc Perrin. Perrin dismissed the allegations of a deliberate infection, and WHO spokesperson Melinda Henry told the Post that members of WHO missions in Libya in 1998 and 1999 felt that further study was necessary, but they "were not invited back."

The case continued to receive minor attention until the conclusion of the second trial and the imposition of the death penalty on 6 May 2004, which provoked a major reaction, and worldwide television coverage.

== Libyan recognition ==
On 24 February 2011, Mustafa Abdul Jalil, Libya's newly resigned Minister of Justice, told Al Jazeera that the responsibility for the HIV infection lies totally with Muammar Gaddafi's regime. However Jalil, who became head of the Libyan National Transitional Council and thus de facto head of state after the assassination of Gaddafi, was one of the judges who twice upheld the nurses' death sentence.

== Timeline ==
- 27 January 2007: The Bulgarian newspaper 24 Часа reports that Gaddafi's elder son, Saif al-Islam Gaddafi expressed hope that the death sentence could be halted and that "a satisfactory solution could be found."
- 15 February 2007: Dimitar Ignatov, a 25-year-old US citizen with Bulgarian origins, who launched two phony web pages for gathering money in support of Libya-jailed nurses, was arrested in a joint raid conducted by policemen from both countries. The money obtained in the scam had gone to his personal account in a Chicago bank.
- 17 February 2007: Lawyer Hari Haralampiev told Darik News that this was the last possible deadline for appealing the sentence before the Supreme Cassation Court of Libya. The court will have to hold the first hearing on the appeal within two months. The court's decision on the case will be the final one in the trial. The Supreme Court may reconfirm or waive the sentences. If they decide to nod the death sentences, then the case would go to the Supreme Court Council where the sentences can be either confirmed, changed or abolished.
- 21 February 2007: Another "entrepreneur" decides to cash in on the "You Are Not Alone" campaign. A One-Lev shop in the southwestern town of Blagoevgrad has started selling the ribbons, despite the fact that they have only been distributed for free since the beginning of the campaign.
- 25 February 2007: The nurses and medic plead innocent to charges of slandering Libyan officers Djuma Misheri and Madjit Shol at a hearing in Criminal Court in Tripoli. The nurses once again pointed them out as their torturers on 1999. They told the court, "Everything that the two officers claim is a contemptible lie," and showed the scars the men left on their bodies. The prosecutor demanded the maximum three-year prison sentence for the nurses in the slander case.
- 28 February 2007: Libyan authorities appeal against the court's decision to acquit Bulgarian doctor Zdravko Georgiev.
- 9 March 2007: Bulgarian media quote Libyan Foreign Affairs Committee Secretary Suleiman Shahoumi as saying in Libya's General People's Congress that the medics would not be executed even if the court upheld their sentence.
- 15 March 2007: Tottenham Hotspur and Bulgarian international footballer, Dimitar Berbatov, says he will wear a "You Are Not Alone" armband during Spurs' matches.
- 16 March 2007: Bulgarian journalist Georgi Gotev proposes that Bulgarian parties and voters co-operate to elect the nurses as Bulgaria's representatives to the European Parliament to pressure both Libya and the EU.
- 27 May 2007: The prisoners were acquitted of slandering Libyan police officers when they said they were tortured.
- 17 July 2007: The Benghazi International Fund had started handing out to families the US$1 million per affected child that would spare the medics' lives, BBC Tripoli correspondent Rana Jawad reported.
- 17 July 2007: Libya commutes death sentences to life imprisonment.
- 24 July 2007: Libya extradited all of the Medics.

AP Story

- 24 July 2007: Bulgarian President Georgi Parvanov pardoned the six medics 45 minutes after they touched down on home soil at Sofia's international airport. "Certain of their innocence, in accordance with the powers vested in him, President Parvanov pardons the medics," foreign minister Ivailo Kalfin said after welcoming the medics back.
- 28 July 2007: Libyan officials said they had sent a memo to the Arab League calling for action against Sofia – and a protest to the EU – because Bulgaria's decision to pardon the medics has angered Tripoli. The BBC reported that the Libyan authorities had expected the freed medics to serve their life terms in Bulgarian jails, Prime Minister Baghdadi Mahmudi said, adding that the deal to free the medics had involved money put up by the Czech Republic, Bulgaria, Slovakia and Qatar, while France had promised to provide equipment for the Benghazi hospital, where the infections had taken place – and training for Libyan medical staff over five years.
- 10 August 2007: Saif al-Islam Gaddafi, son of the leader of Libya, admitted that the confessions were extracted through torture with electric shocks and threats targeted at the medic's families, and confirmed that some of the children had been infected with HIV before the medics arrived in Libya. He said that the guilty verdict of the Libyan courts had been based on "conflicting reports", and said that:"There is negligence, there is a disaster that took place, there is a tragedy, but it was not deliberate."
- 24 February 2011: Mustafa Abdul Jalil, Libya's newly resigned Minister of Justice, told Al Jazeera that the responsibility for the HIV infection lay entirely with Muammar Gaddafi's regime. However Mustafa Abdul Jalil, who became head of the Libyan NTC and then Libyan head of state after the very public murder of Muammar Gadaafi, was one of the judges who sentenced the nurses to death.

== See also ==
- Tuskegee syphilis experiment
- J. Marion Sims
- Peter Buxtun
- Contaminated blood scandal in the United Kingdom
