= Egypt Economic Development Conference =

Three day event that took place in Egyptian Red Sea resort

Egypt Economic Development Conference مؤتمر دعم وتنمية الإقتصاد المصري
- Host country: Egypt
- Date: 13–15 March 2015
- Motto: Egypt The Future
- Cities: Sharm El Sheikh
- Venues: Maritim Jolie Ville International Congress Center
- Participants: Abdel Fattah el-Sisi; Foreign Dignitaries (incl. 15 HOSG); Business Executives
- Website: www.egyptthefuture.com Archived 11 October 2016 at the Wayback Machine

The Egypt Economic Development Conference (EEDC) was a three-day event that took place in the Egyptian Red Sea resort of Sharm El Sheikh, Egypt. On March 13, 2015, over 2,000 delegates from 112 countries arrived in Egypt to attend the conference.

On the first day, a proposal for a new Egyptian capital city was announced. Kuwait, Saudi Arabia and United Arab Emirates pledged $4 billion each; whilst Oman announced it would provide $500 million. BG Group and BP both made a commitment to invest $4 billion and $12 billion respectively.

== Background ==
The EEDC had been initially suggested by the King Abdullah of Saudi Arabia, whose country along with the United Arab Emirates and other Gulf monarchies, have been the largest financial and political backers of Egypt's president Abdel Fattah el-Sisi. Abel Fattah Sisi led the coup d'état of Muslim Brotherhood-backed president, Mohamed Morsi, in the summer of 2013, pledging billions of dollars in aid to the new Egyptian government. Sisi, who vowed to tackle the country's economic turmoil since the 2011 revolution, has announced austerity measures to lower Egypt's budget deficit.

In January 2015, the Egyptian government told an International Monetary Fund delegation that it aims to achieve a 3.8% growth rate by June, claiming that Egypt's economy grew by 6.8% in the third quarter of the previous year. During the conference, the IMF's chief, Christine Lagarde, praised the government's 2014 energy subsidy reforms and its plans to increase investment in the country, but she noted, citing World Bank figures, that it takes over 60 days to register property in Egypt and over 1000 days to enforce a contract. The day prior to the event, Sisi ratified a new set of investment and civil services laws following months of fiscal and legal reforms aiming to regulate and improve investment in Egypt ahead of the conference, a move which Lagarde described as "A very good step in the right direction" during her speech.

=== Organizers ===
The conference's organizer, Richard Attias, expected the unveiling of over thirty projects "which can attract billions of dollars of investment," with more than 2,500 high-level attendees, including heads of state, public figures, chairmen, and CEOs of multinational corporations among others.

== The conference ==
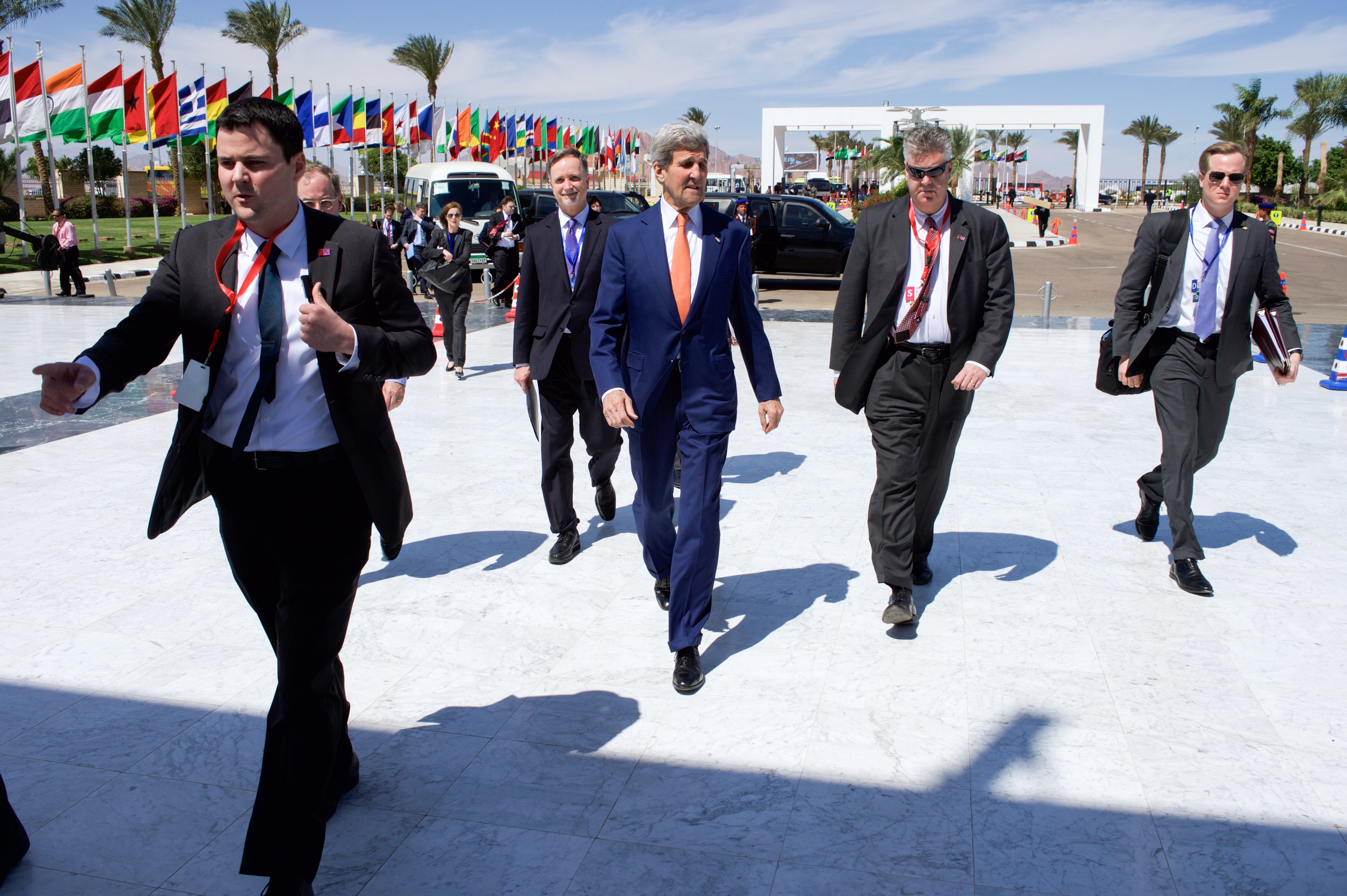
Secretary Kerry Arrives at the Convention Hall.

During the first day, the Egyptian minister of environment, Khaled Fahmy, revealed a new biofuel project in cooperation with the agricultural sector. General Electric announced at the conference that it would invest $200 million in a new training and manufacturing facility in the city of Suez and that it had delivered 34 gas turbines as part of a project to supply 2.6 gigawatts to its grid by May 2015.

U.S. Secretary of State John Kerry attended the conference and delivered a speech of encouragement to Egypt's economy during an American Chamber of Commerce event. Egypt's irrigation minister, Hossam Moghazy, later discussed with a European Union delegation the One Million Feddan land reclamation project, one of the highlights in Sisi's election campaign a year earlier. The African Development Bank announced it would invest in energy projects, particularly in a solar power plant in Kom Ombo and a wind farm in the Gulf of Suez.

During the opening ceremony, Sisi gave a speech where he said he hoped to attract billions of dollars by the end of the summit and promised new strategies to support the private sector and investors. He also listed a number of major projects, including the land reclamation project, the New Suez Canal digging project, the Suez Canal Area Development project and the Golden Triangle project among others.

During the second day, several speeches and presentations were held starting with Prime minister Ibrahim Mahlab joined by Hisham Ramez, Governor of Central Bank of Egypt, and Ministers of Finance and Planning and Administrative Reform presenting Sisi's administration's vision on how to turn the vision into action showcasing Egypt's economic reform plan. Later Nobel laureate Ahmed Zewail showcased his view on Egypt's technology's future, followed by Minister of Finance of Saudi Arabia, Ibrahim Abdulaziz Al-Assaf providing perspective on Egypt.

CNN anchor John Defterios hosted a discussion between leaders from global corporations discussing where Egypt stands in their investment priorities followed by a conversation with Joe Kaeser of Siemens.

A conversation moderated by CNBC anchor Hadley Gamble regarding Egypt's Energy crisis under the title of "Egypt’s Energy Equation", the energy mix in Egypt and how Egypt can best achieve energy security as part of its development plans were discussed.

Adnan Nawaz moderated a conversation on the diversification imperative for emerging economies and the demands for a sustainable and long-term growth, between the CEO of DHL Express, Chairman of Lazard, CEO of Etisalat, CEO of CAD Fund, and CEO of WPP.

Five run in parallel sector-level sessions included an overview from ministers, presentation of sector opportunities by local investment banks, and input from private sector participants. The sessions were on oil, gas & mining; housing, utilities & development; ICT; industry & manufacturing; and tourism.

A session headed by Naglaa El-Ehwany, Minister of International Cooperation, discussed how can the major international financial institutions improve the effectiveness of their support for Egypt's economic development.

Chairman of Suez Canal Authority, Mohab Mameesh, ended the day with a presentation titled "Suez Canal Development: Egypt's Gift to the World". The presentation showcased the Suez Canal Area Development Project.

== Participants ==
The Egyptian Foreign Ministry did not invite Iran, Israel and Turkey as the "criteria do not apply to them" due to their investment levels. Turkey's non-participation is also believed to be a result of the country's strained relations with Sisi's government since the 2013 Egyptian coup d'état.

=== High level delegation ===
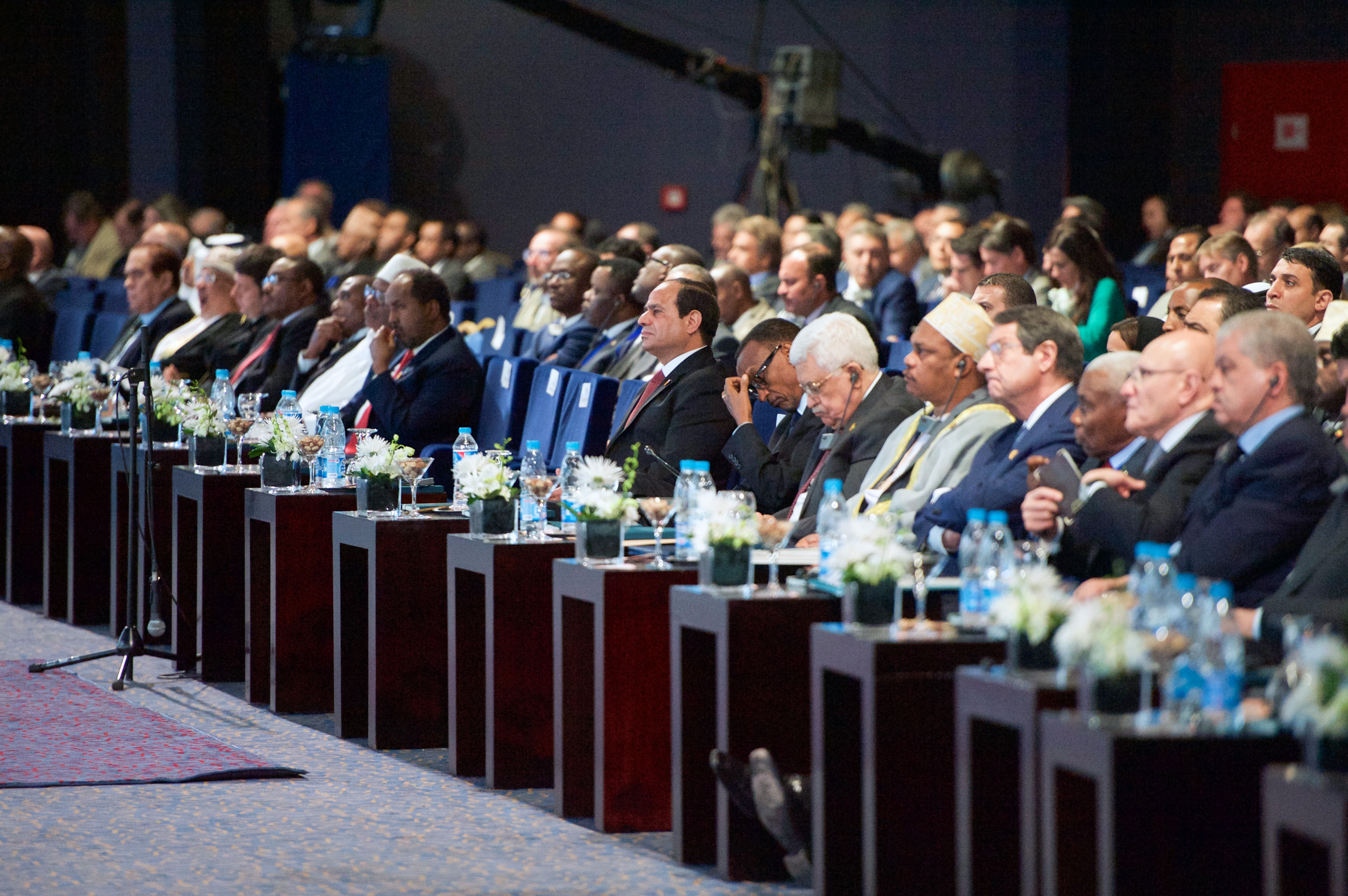
Heads of State and Government at the conference.

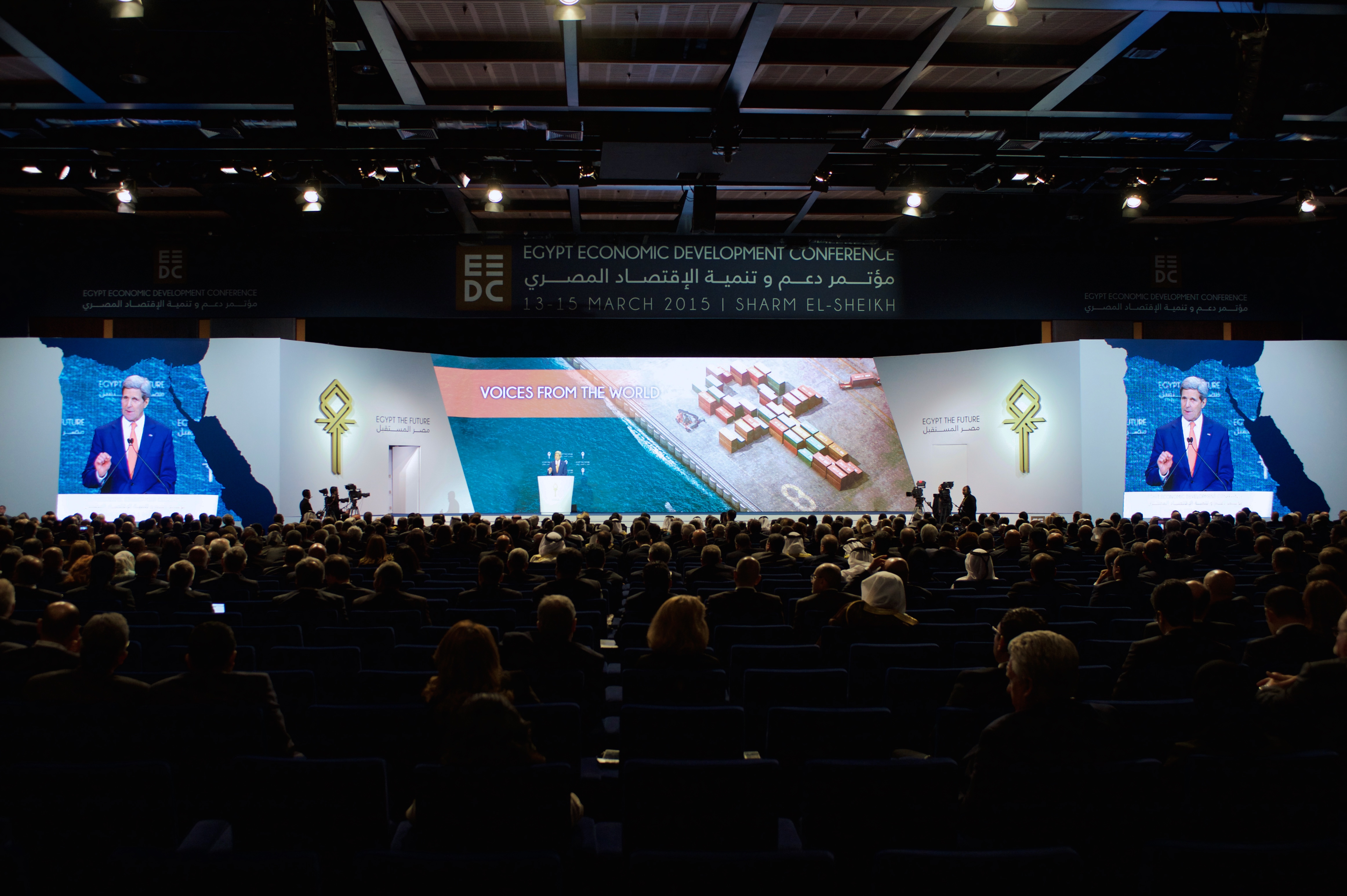
John Kerry addressing the audience at the conference.

Country	Title	Leader
Bahrain	King	Hamad bin Isa Al Khalifa
Comoros	President	Ikililou Dhoinine
Cyprus	President	Nicos Anastasiades
Ethiopia	Prime Minister	Hailemariam Desalegn
Italy	Prime Minister	Matteo Renzi
Jordan	King	Abdullah II
Kuwait	Emir	Sabah Al-Ahmad Al-Jaber Al-Sabah
Lebanon	Prime Minister	Tammam Salam
Libya	Speaker	Aguila Saleh Issa
Mali	President	Ibrahim Boubacar Keïta
Oman	Prime Minister	Yahia bin Mahfouz Al Manthiry
Palestine	President	Mahmoud Abbas
Rwanda	President	Paul Kagame
Saudi Arabia	Crown Prince	Muqrin
Somalia	President	Hassan Sheikh Mohamud
Sudan	President	Omar al-Bashir
Tanzania	Vice-president	Mohamed Gharib Bilal
United Arab Emirates	Vice-president and Ruler of Dubai	Mohammed bin Rashid Al Maktoum

=== Government representatives ===
Country	Title	Leader
China	Minister of Commerce	Gao Hucheng
France	Minister of Finance	Michel Sapin
Germany	Minister for Economic Affairs and Energy	Sigmar Gabriel
Malawi	Minister of Trade and Industry	Joseph Mwanamveka
Eritrea	Minister of Foreign Affairs	Osman Saleh
Russia	Minister of Economic Development	Alexey Ulyukaev
Spain		
United Arab Emirates	Foreign Minister	Abdullah bin Zayed Al Nahyan
United Kingdom	Foreign Secretary	Philip Hammond
United Kingdom	former Prime Minister	Tony Blair
United States	Secretary of State	John Kerry

=== Multilateral organisations ===
Organisation	Title	
International Monetary Fund	Managing director	Christine Lagarde
World Bank Group	Managing director	Sri Mulyani Indrawati
