= Novinar =

Bulgarian daily newspaper

Novinar (Bulgarian: Новинар) is a Bulgarian national daily newspaper published in Sofia.

== History and profile ==
Novinar was established in 1993. The paper is part of the company with the same name and is published in tabloid format.

Novinar is the only Bulgarian newspaper to reprint all 12 Danish Mohammad cartoons. Later in 2006 it published 12 cartoons of Libyan leader Muammar Gaddafi with the aim to make public the sufferings of the five Bulgarian nurses sentenced to death in Libya on trumped-up charges of deliberately infecting more than 400 Libyan children in Benghazi with HIV.

In 2002 the circulation of Novinar was 29,000 copies. The paper had a circulation of 25,000 copies in 2004.
