= Notes from Hell =

2009 novel by Nikolay Yordanov and Valya Chervenyashka

- Notes from Hell, 2014 eBook edition
- Author: Nikolay Yordanov and Valya Chervenyashka
- Translators: Milena Todorova (English), Doncho Hristev (French)
- Language: Bulgarian, English, French
- Genre: Biographical novel
- Publisher: Hermes Books (2009), 30 Degrees South Publishers (2010), NY Creative and Publishing (2014)
- Publication date: November 20, 2009; 16 years ago
- Pages: 140
- ISBN: 978-619-90250-3-1
- Followed by: Don't Tell Mama
- Website: www.yordanovbooks.com

Notes from Hell (Bulgarian: "Записки от ада") is a biographical novel, written by Nikolay Yordanov and Valya Cherveniashka about Cherveniashka's life in several Libyan prisons during the HIV trial in Libya. It follows the events during eight and a half years, spent behind bars under the rule of Muammar Gaddafi. Cherveniashka, together with six more medics, was accused of being involved in the mass murder of hundreds of Libyan children, by deliberately infecting them with the HIV virus in a hospital in Benghazi. She was sentenced to death several times between 2002 and 2007, and released after political negotiations on 24 July 2007.

== Development ==
Yordanov met Cherveniashka during filming of the TV show Psychic Challenge in 2008, and proposed that they write the book together. They met several times in her daughter's apartment in Sofia. The process took one and a half years, and the first edition was published in November 2009.

== Plot ==
In 1999 seventeen Bulgarian nurses were kidnapped from a hospital in Benghazi, Libya where they worked and were confined in a police station in the capital Tripoli. During the next eight and a half years five of the nurses, including Cherveniashka, were held in different prisons accused of deliberately infecting more than 400 children with HIV. They survived torture, physical and mental abuse, and several death sentences, before their release in 2007. Cherveniashka told her story to her co-author one year after her return to Bulgaria.

== Violent content ==
All of the defendants in the case claim that they had been tortured. In the chapters "The Red Carpet", "The Hell in Me", and "Death Women Walking" Cherveniashka describes in detail the different methods of torture she experienced, including drowning, beating, hanging, dog attacks and many more. She was also subjected to psychological violence, such as simulated infection with the HIV virus, and witnessed the executions of other prisoners.

== Publications ==
The book was first published in Bulgaria by Hermes Books as "Записки от ада: Ужасите в либийските затвори" ("Notes from Hell: The Horror of the Libyan Prisons") on November 20, 2009. On December 2, 2009, it was presented by Bulgaria's ex-foreign Minister of International Affairs - Solomon Passy, who worked actively on the medics release.

In March 2010 Notes from Hell was published in Southern Africa by "30° South Publishers" as "Notes from Hell: A Bulgarian Nurse in Libya".

"Notes From Hell" was re-issued as an e-book by 30° South Publishers in 2011. Three years later it was published again in Bulgarian and English by NY Creative and Publishing. It is available on various formats, including epub, mobi, PDF and Kindle on Amazon, iTunes, as well in major online libraries.

In 2017, marking tenth anniversary of the medics liberation, a French language edition was published with different cover and new subtitle as Notes from Hell: A True Story.

In 2018 British actress Nano Nagle voiced Cherveniashka's biography in an audiobook adaptation of the story.

== International editions ==
The French edition cover of the book, published in October 2017

Date Published	Title	Subtitle	Publisher	Territory	Language	Type	ISBN/ASIN
November 20, 2009	"Записки от ада"	"Ужасите в либийските затвори"	Hermes Books	Bulgaria	Bulgarian	Paperback	9789542608226
March 1, 2010	"Notes from Hell"	"A Bulgarian Nurse in Libya"	30° Publishing	Southern Africa	English	Paperback	9789542608226
March 1, 2012	"Notes from Hell"	"A Bulgarian Nurse in Libya"	30° Publishing	Worldwide	English	eBook	781920143473
September 1, 2014	"Notes from Hell"		NY Creative and Publishing	Worldwide	English	eBook	9786199025031/B00OPDDUSM
October 28, 2014	"Записки от ада"		NY Creative and Publishing	Worldwide	Bulgarian	eBook	9786199025017
October 9, 2017	"Notes De L’Enfer"	"Une historie vraie"	NY Creative and Publishing	Worldwide	French	eBook	9786199025055
November 30, 2018	"Notes from Hell"		NY Creative and Publishing	Worldwide	English	Audiobook	B07KRMC2KY

== Critical reception ==
Cherveniashka on the set of "Psychic challenge", 2008

The book received positive reviews in Bulgaria, the country Chervinashka is from. A journalist from Standart newspaper called it "a significant topic of discussion". Another newspaper, Telegraph praises the title as "one of the most emotional and revealing confessions". Television journalist Ani Tzolova described it as "powerful story".

In South Africa Notes from Hell also received positive reaction from the critics. According to Michelle Bristow-Bovey from Cape Times, "Notes from Hell" documents more than a decade of torture, cruelty and despair. This intimate account is relayed with raw honesty and emotion. A cold, sobering look at some of life's injustices." Dries Brunt from Citizen claims that "...This story shows brutality in its most extreme form, a wilful act of cruel injustice for which the Libyan government stands accused. Reading this book will make you cringe."
