= The New York Forum =

The New York Forum is a New York-based organization, holding an annual meeting in New York City that brings together political and business leaders from around the world as well as journalists. The Forum was founded in 2010 by French event producer Richard Attias.

== Origins ==
The New York Forum was initiated by Richard Attias, former organizer of the World Economic Forum and co-founder of the Clinton Global Initiative in order to create a global meeting "dedicated to growth". Attias wanted to create "an event exclusively dedicated to economic issues" that would be solution oriented.

== Participants and activities ==
Over the years participants have included Secretary of State Hillary Clinton, New York Mayor Michael Bloomberg, businessman Ricardo Salinas and IMF director Christine Lagarde.

The New York Forum has built its own economic think-tank, The New York Forum Institute, created for "testing, exploring and sharing ways to rebuild confidence and credibility, and to reinvigorate the economy".

The two main topics of the 2014 discussions were 'Is technology killing jobs?' and 'What will be the economic impact of climate change?'.

=== New York Forum Africa ===
From June 8 to 10, 2012, the first edition of The New York Forum AFRICA was held in Libreville, Gabon. Many personalities such as Robert De Niro and Muhammad Yunus took part in the debates about Africa's economic future.

The Last New York Forum Africa took place from May 23 to 25, 2014 and focused on transformation of the continent: unlocking the competitiveness of the African economy through building value chains around the transformation of the continent's natural resources. Speakers and participants included President Paul Kagame from Rwanda, Laurent Fabius, French Minister of Foreign Affairs and International Development, Vicente Fox, ex-President of Mexico, Youssou N’Dour, former Minister of Tourism and Culture of Senegal, Tunisia's former Minister of Finance Jaloul Ayed, UN Under-Secretary General and Executive Secretary of ECA Carlos Lopes, International recording artist Akon, among others.
